= The Muraka, Conrad Maldives =

Underwater hotel suite in the Maldives

The Muraka is first underwater hotel suite in the world, opening in late 2018 on Rangali Island in the Alif Dhaal Atoll of the Maldives. It is part of the Conrad Maldives Rangali Island Resort, owned by Hilton Worldwide. Muraka means "coral" in Dhiveli, the Maldivian language.

== Design and construction ==
The Muraka was designed by New York-based architecture company Yuji Yamazaki and local architect Ahmed Saleem. The two-story structure consists of an above-water master bedroom, twin bedroom, sun deck, infinity pool, bar and kitchen on its upper floor and a 540-metric-ton (600-short-ton; 530-long-ton) lower level, 16.4 ft (5.0 m) below sea level, with a double bedroom and ensuite bathroom. This bedroom has a curved acrylic glass ceiling and walls that allow guests to observe the sea life outside, while its accompanying ensuite bathroom and walk-in closet have floor-to-ceiling glass sections. The two floors are connected by both a spiral staircase and an elevator.

Everything was built in Singapore and then transported to the Maldives by ship. It was then nailed to ten concrete piles to hold it in place. The total cost of construction was $15 million.

== Cost and amenities ==
The suite costs $50,000 a night, with a minimum four-day stay. This includes a dedicated staff who are on-call 24 hours a day, including a butler and a chef.

== Access ==
The Muraka can be accessed via private seaplane from the airport or by speedboat from the main resort. It is also connected to the rest of the resort by a jetty.
