= JR Gate Tower =

Skyscraper in Nagoya, Japan

General information
- Status: Completed
- Type: Retail, Hotel, Office
- Location: Nagoya, Japan, 1-1-3 Meieki, Nakamura-ku
- Coordinates: 35.17220°N 136.88260°E
- Construction started: October 2012
- Completed: November 2016
- Opened: 2017
- Owner: JR Central Consultants

Height
- Roof: 211.1 m (693 ft)

Technical details
- Structural system: All-Steel
- Floor count: 46 (+6 underground)
- Floor area: 265,576 m^{2} (2,860,000 sq ft)

Design and construction
- Architects: Kohn Pedersen Fox; Nikken Sekkei
- Main contractor: Taisei Corporation

The JR Gate Tower (JRゲートタワー, JR gētotawā) is a mixed-use skyscraper in the Nakamura-ku district of Nagoya, Japan. Built between 2012 and 2016, the tower stands at 211.1 m (693 ft) tall with 46 floors ans is the current 5th tallest building in Nagoya. It is also part of the JR Central Station complex alongside the JR Central Towers.

== History ==
The building is part of the JR Gate Tower Construction Project, a redevelopment plan for the Nagoya Terminal Building announced by Central Japan Railway Company (JR Central) in 2008. Construction proceeded at the same time as "JP Tower Nagoya," which was completed as part of the JP Tower Nagoya Construction Project, a redevelopment project on the site of the former Nagoya Central Post Office institution's Nagoya Station Branch Office to the north. The office section opened first on November 7, 2016. The commercial facilities (with some exceptions) and hotel opened on April 17, 2017.

=== Architecture ===
The initial plan called for a high-rise building with 55 floors above ground and 5 floors below ground, reaching a height of approximately 260 meters, and a low-rise building with 16 floors above ground and 5 floors below ground, reaching a height of approximately 80m, with a total floor area of approximately 280,000 m^{2} (3,010,000 sq ft). However, after a reassessment of office demand and other factors in 2010, the plan was revised to a high-rise building with 46 floors above ground and 6 floors below ground, reaching a height of approximately 220 meters, and a low-rise building with 18 floors above ground and 6 floors below ground, reaching a height of approximately 90m, with a total floor area of approximately 265,000 m^{2} (2,850,000 sq ft).

It is a skyscraper with 46 floors above ground and 6 floors underground, and is approximately 220 meters tall. In addition to the lower floors up to the 15th floor (commercial facilities) being connected to JR Central Towers (JR Nagoya Takashimaya), a pedestrian walkway on the 2nd floor above ground connects JP Tower to Central Towers, ensuring access from Nagoya Station (pedestrian deck) to the office entrance of JP Tower.

The bus terminal, which previously spanned two levels, has been consolidated onto the first floor and renamed "Nagoya Station Bus Terminal". During the construction of this building, the various bus stops were dispersed along the surrounding main roads, and as a result, modifications such as widening sidewalks and setting up temporary bus stops on the roads were carried out. In addition, long-distance routes such as express buses have been completely relocated to the Taiko-dori exit on the west side of Nagoya Station, and a new temporary facility has been constructed and is currently in operation for these routes.

The basement has been constructed down to the 6th floor (foundation base: GL (ground level) -35.2m), but the 5th and 6th basement floors will be used as part of the planned Nagoya Station for the Chuo Shinkansen maglev line. The other floors have not been designated for use other than machine rooms and collection facilities. The underground shopping area connected on the 1st basement floor was renamed from "Termina" to "Gatewalk" in July 2015.

In 2018, it received the 59th BCS Award, sponsored by the Japan Federation of Construction Contractors, along with the adjacent JP Tower Nagoya.

=== Technical details ===
The following is based on "Design and Construction of Skyscrapers with Deep Underground Structures".

- Building name: JR Gate Tower
- Building use: Offices, commercial facilities, hotels, bus terminals, parking lots, train stations
- Design Architect: Kohn Pedersen Fox Associates PC
- Detailed design: Nagoya Station New Building (tentative name) Detailed Design Joint Venture (Taisei Corporation, Nikken Sekkei, JR Tokai Consultants)
- Construction: Nagoya Station New Building (tentative name) New Construction and Other Works Joint Venture (Taisei Corporation, Kajima Corporation)
- Foundation structure: Piled raft foundation (cast-in-place reinforced concrete pile foundation, cast-in-place reinforced concrete underground wall foundation)
- Superstructure: Steel frame (partially CFT construction for columns), rigid frame structure with buckling-restrained braces.
- Substructure: Steel-reinforced concrete (SRC), reinforced concrete (partially steel), rigid frame structure with seismic walls
- Vibration damping components: oil dampers, synchronized viscous mass dampers
- Number of floors: 46 floors above ground, 6 floors below ground (high-rise building), 18 floors above ground, 6 floors below ground (low-rise building)
- Building height: 220 meters
- Foundation depth: Foundation base GL (ground level) -35.2m (direct foundation), pile tip GL -76.0m (cast-in-place concrete piles and underground wall)
- Site area: 11,695 m^{2} (126,000 sq ft)
- Building area: 10,492 m^{2} (113,000 sq ft)
- Total floor area: 265,575 m^{2} (2,860,000 sq ft)
- Elevators: 61 units (24 for commercial area, 15 for office area, 19 for building common areas, 1 for parking, 2 for freight)
- Escalators: 85 units (3 on the pedestrian deck, 12 for shared use in the building (contributing to the city), 68 in the commercial area, 2 in the office area)

=== Tennancy ===
From the basement to the 8th floor, the Takashimaya Gate Tower Mall, an expanded store of JR Nagoya Takashimaya located in Central Towers, is situated. Takashimaya Gate Tower Mall is more of a specialty store complex with tenants like a fashion building, focusing on apparel and cafes aimed at young people, rather than a typical department store. Bic Camera occupies the 9th and 10th floors, while Uniqlo and GU share the 11th floor. The 12th and 13th floors are connected to JR Central Towers and consist of the Gate Tower Plaza Restaurant Street, comprising 37 restaurants. The 15th floor is a sky street connecting to JR Central Towers, with an office entrance, hotel front desk, and hotel restaurant. The 18th to 24th floors house the Nagoya JR Gate Tower Hotel, part of the JR Tokai Hotels group, and the 26th to 44th floors are office floors.

== Interiors and spacing ==
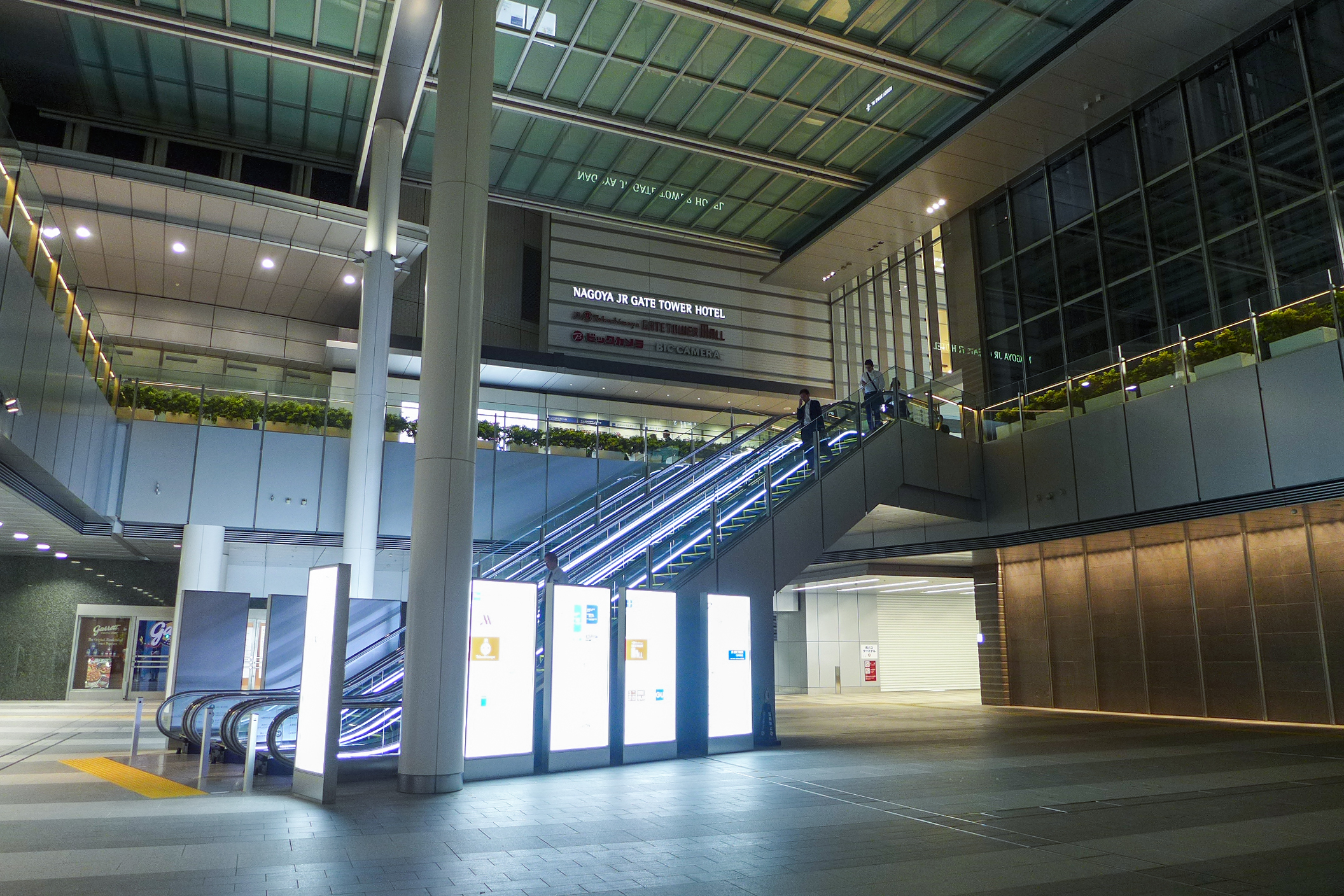
Main entrance

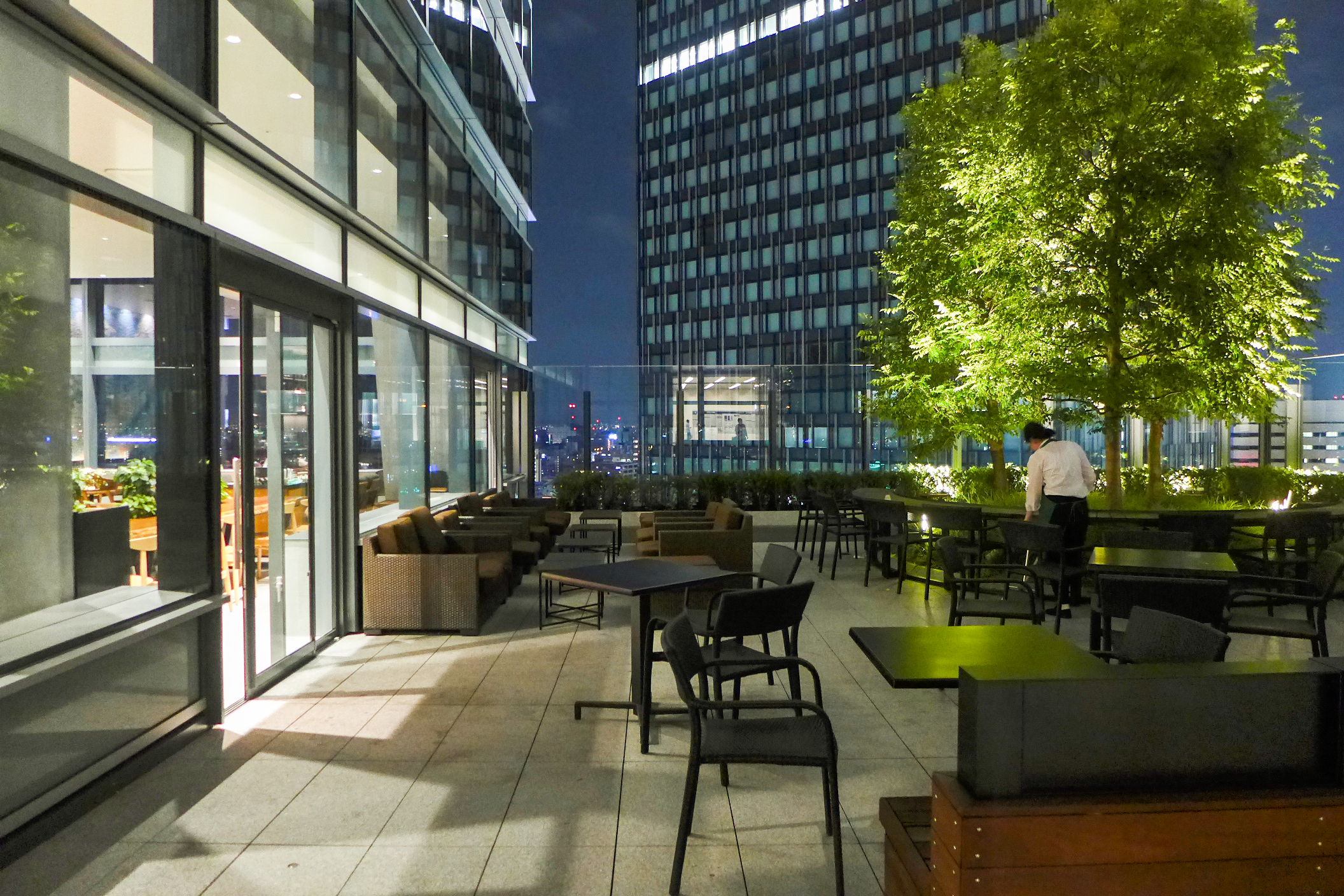
Fifteenth floor: "The tallest Starbucks in Japan "

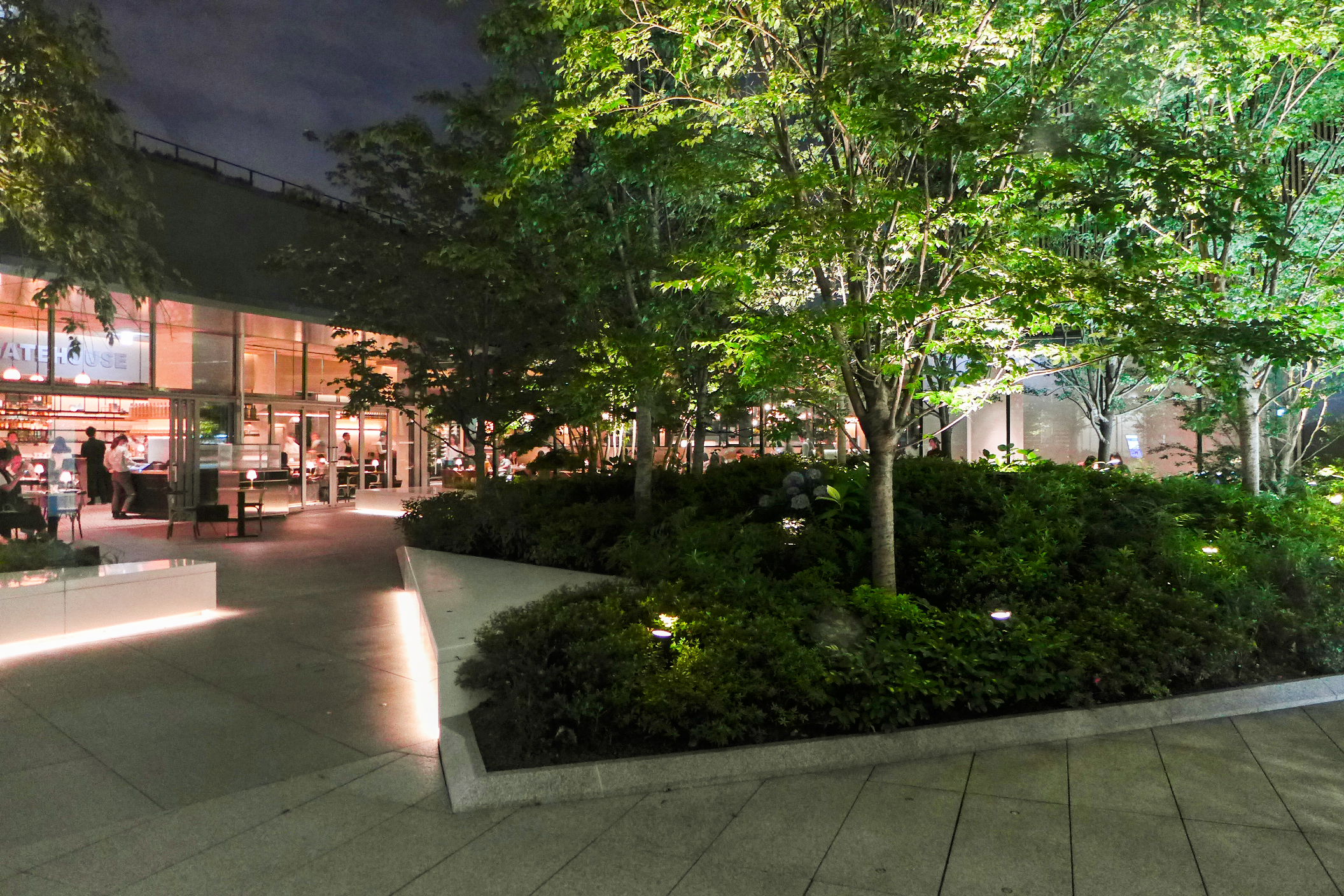
Fifteenth Floor Rooftop Garden

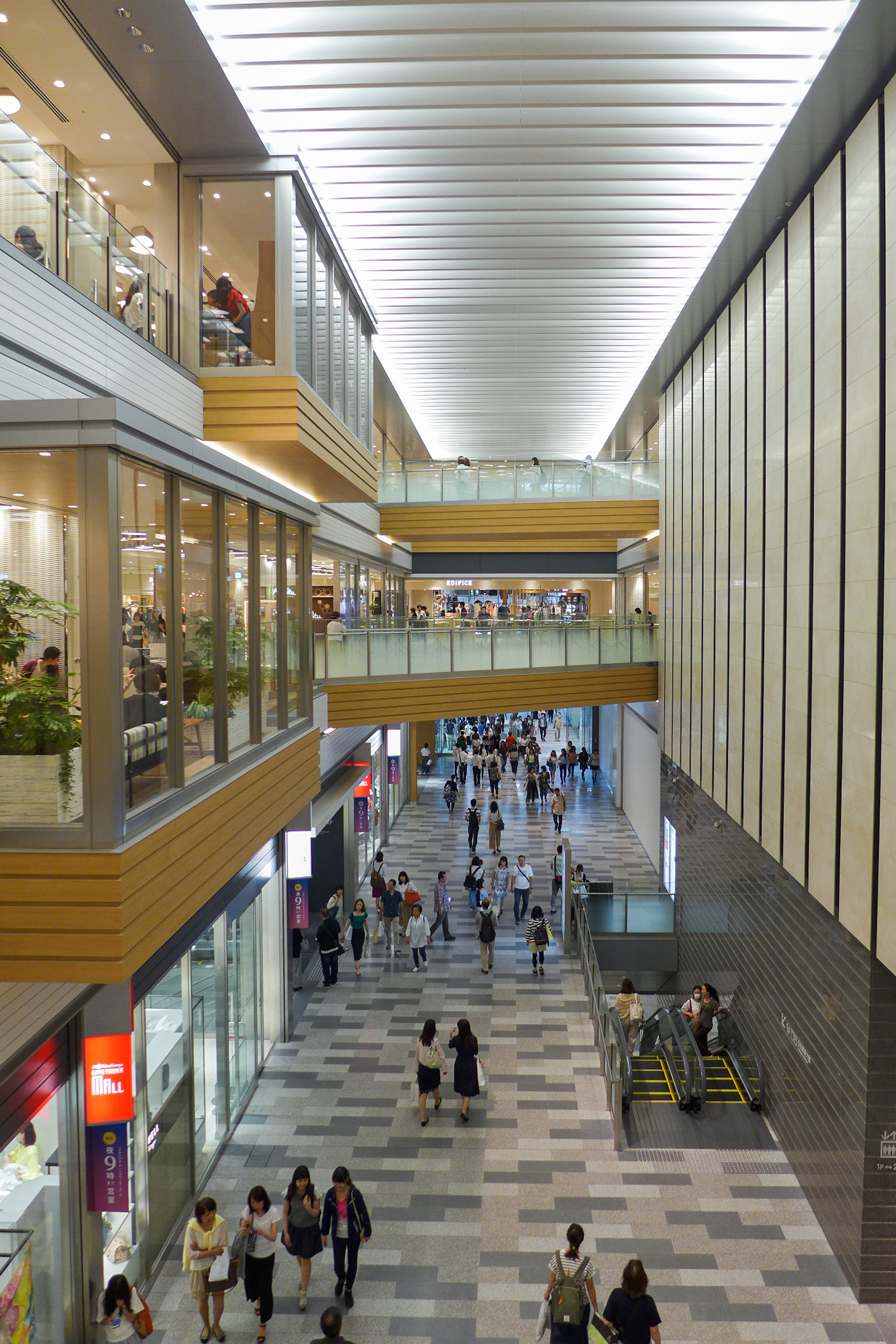
Left main lobby area

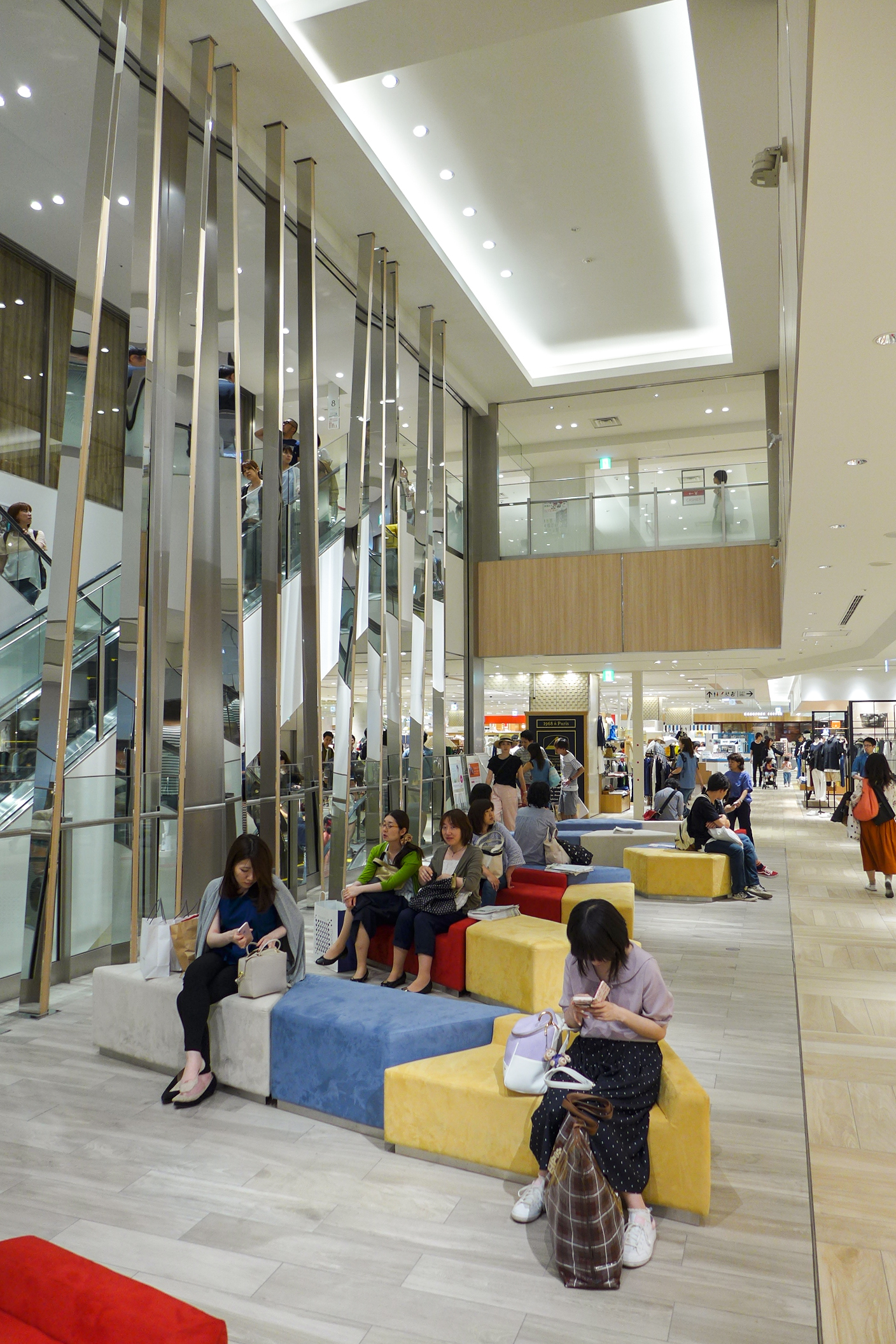
Right main lobby area

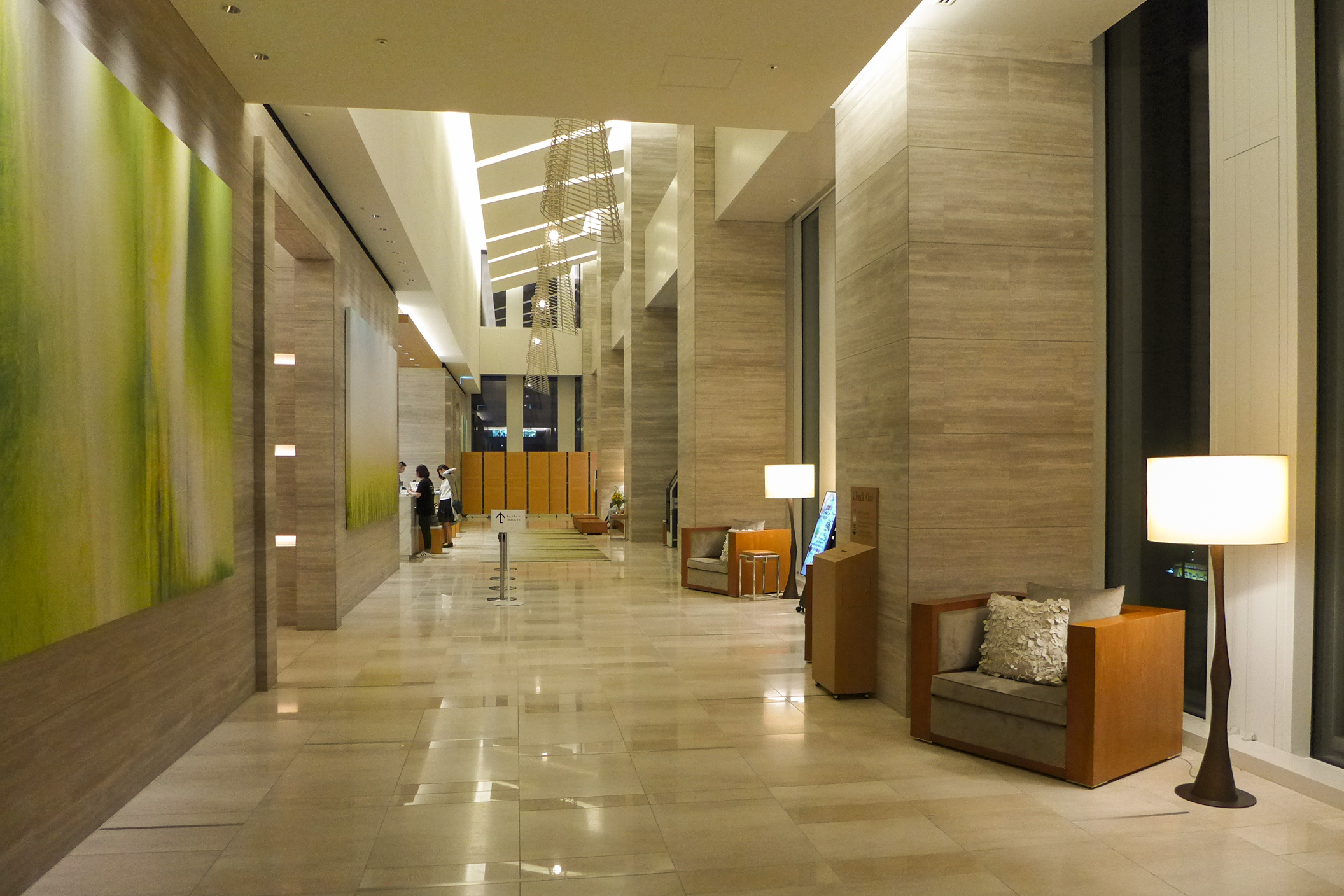
Nagoya JR Gate Tower Hotel

== Construction ==
=== Chronology ===
- December 22, 2008 - The "Basic Urban Development Plan" for the Nagoya Terminal Building site in front of Nagoya Station and its adjacent area (1-1 Meieki, Nakamura-ku, Nagoya) was announced.
- January 26, 2009 (Heisei 21) - an environmental impact assessment methodology document in accordance with the Nagoya City Environmental Impact Assessment Ordinance.
- 2010 - JR Central announced that, following a re-examination of office demand around Nagoya Station, it would revise part of its Nagoya Terminal Building reconstruction plan, reducing the scale from the originally planned 55-story building, 260m tall, with a total floor area of 280,000m² to a 46 -story building, 220m tall, with a total floor area of 260,000 m^{2} (2,800,000 sq ft).
- 2012 (Heisei 24) - Demolition work on the Nagoya Terminal Building continued until the summer. The Meitetsu-Shin-Nagoya Underground Tunnel route runs at a shallow depth directly beneath it, and in order to protect this tunnel, protective work called "Meitetsu Line Box Structure Protection Work" was carried out in parallel from the final stages of the Nagoya Terminal Building demolition work until the foundation work for the JR Gate Tower was completed. Structurally, the Meitetsu Nagoya Main Line runs vertically through the first to third basement levels of the JR Gate Tower.
- 2015 (Heisei 27) - The roof-raising ceremony is held.
- 2016 - The office section opens.
- 2017 (Heisei 29)
  - March Starbucks Coffee, located on the 15th floor, opened ahead of schedule. It was touted as "Japan's tallest Starbucks" at 70 meters above ground level.
  - March 30 - The completion ceremony is held.
  - April - Among the commercial facilities, Bic Camera, Uniqlo, GU, and the Gate Tower Plaza restaurant area opened ahead of schedule.
  - April 17 - Takashimaya Gate Tower Mall and Nagoya JR Gate Tower Hotel open.

=== Gallery ===
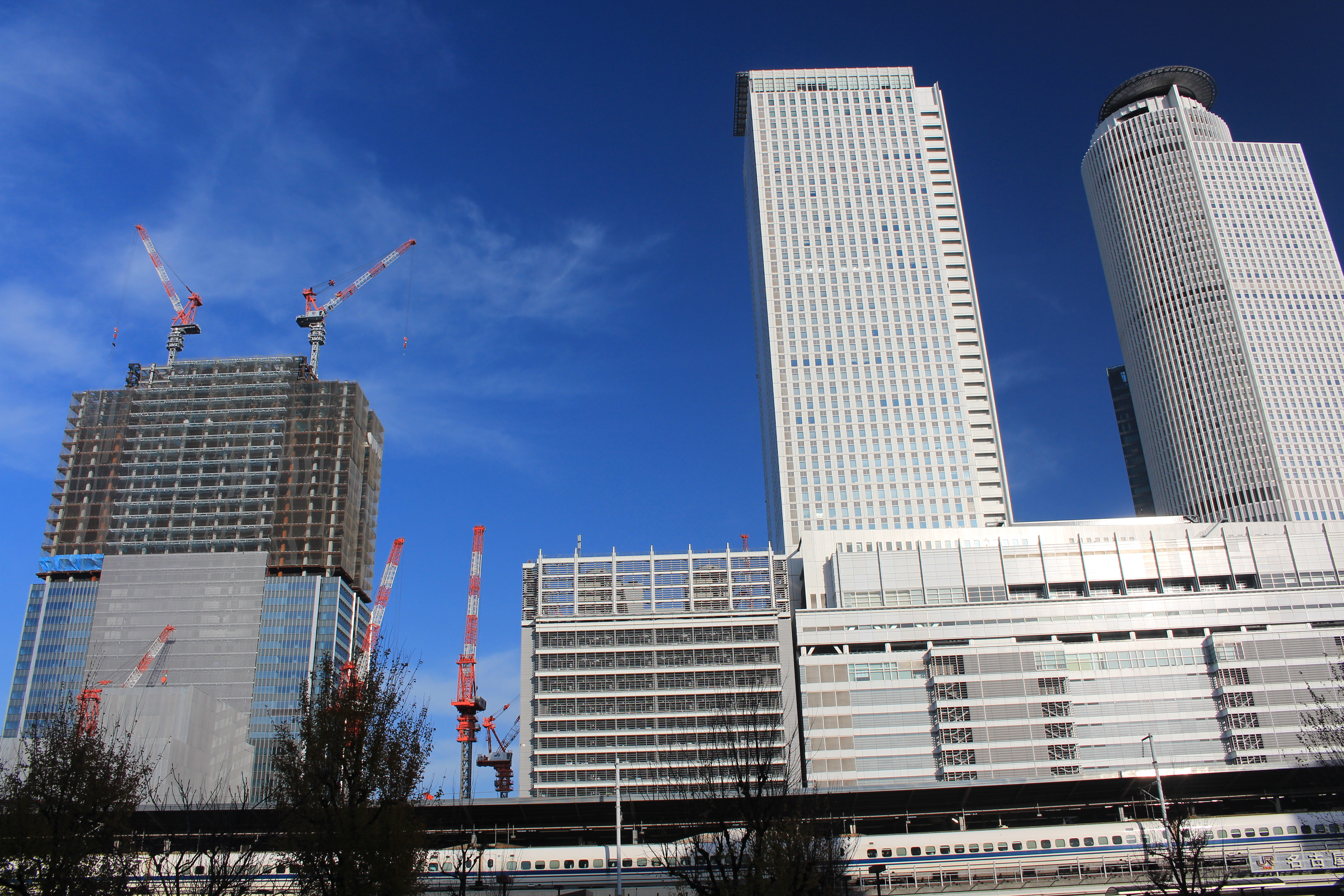
View from Nagoya Station West Exit: JP Tower Nagoya (under construction), JR Gate Tower (construction begun), and JR Central Towers (December 10, 2014)

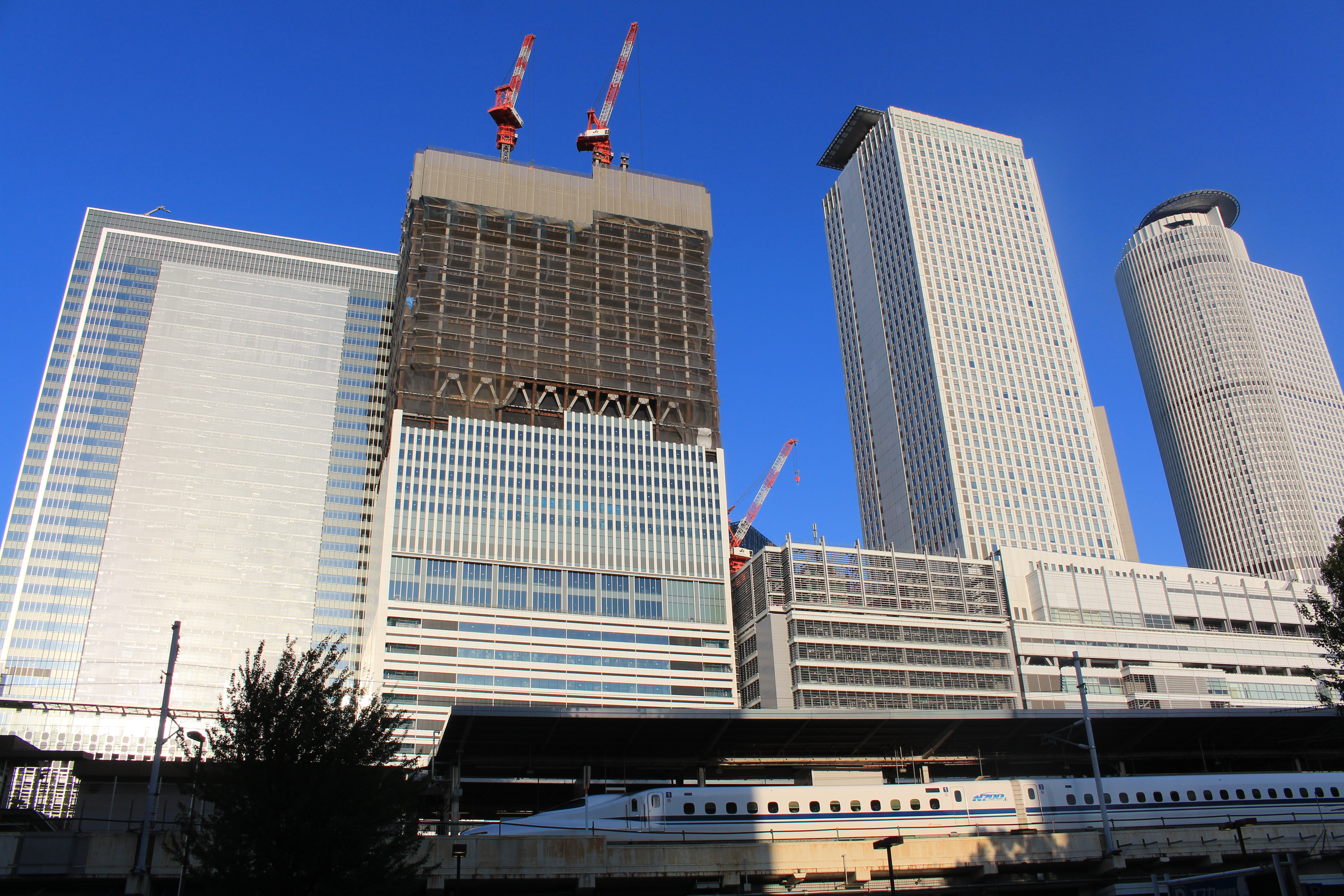
View from Nagoya Station West Exit of JP Tower Nagoya (currently under preparation for opening), JR Gate Tower, and JR Central Towers (under construction) (October 8, 2015)

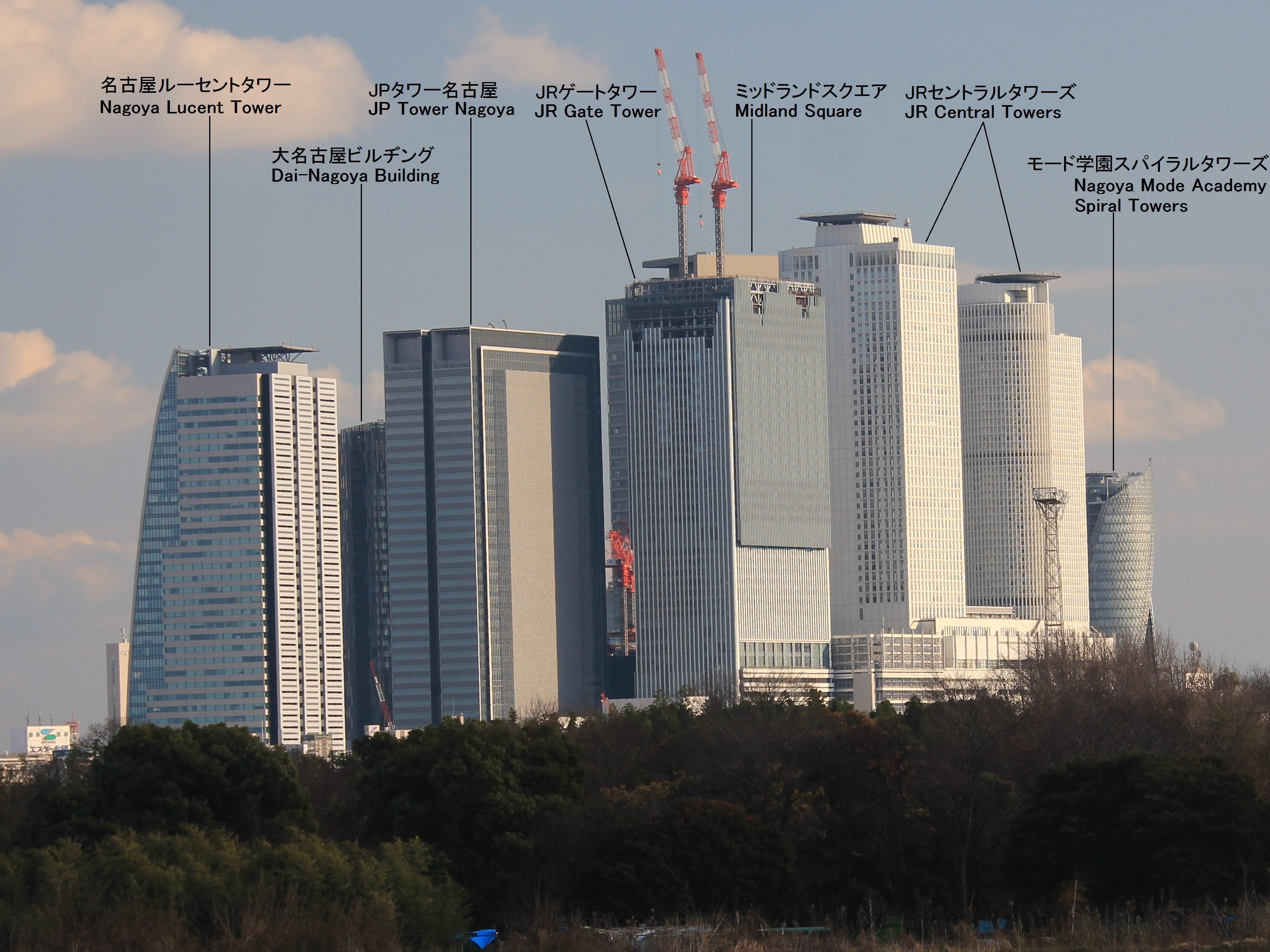
View from the northwest: JR Gate Tower under construction, JP Tower Nagoya on the left, and JR Central Towers on the right (January 11, 2016)

== See also ==
- List of tallest buildings in Nagoya
- List of skyscrapers by floor area
