= Midland Square =

Skyscraper in Nagoya, Japan

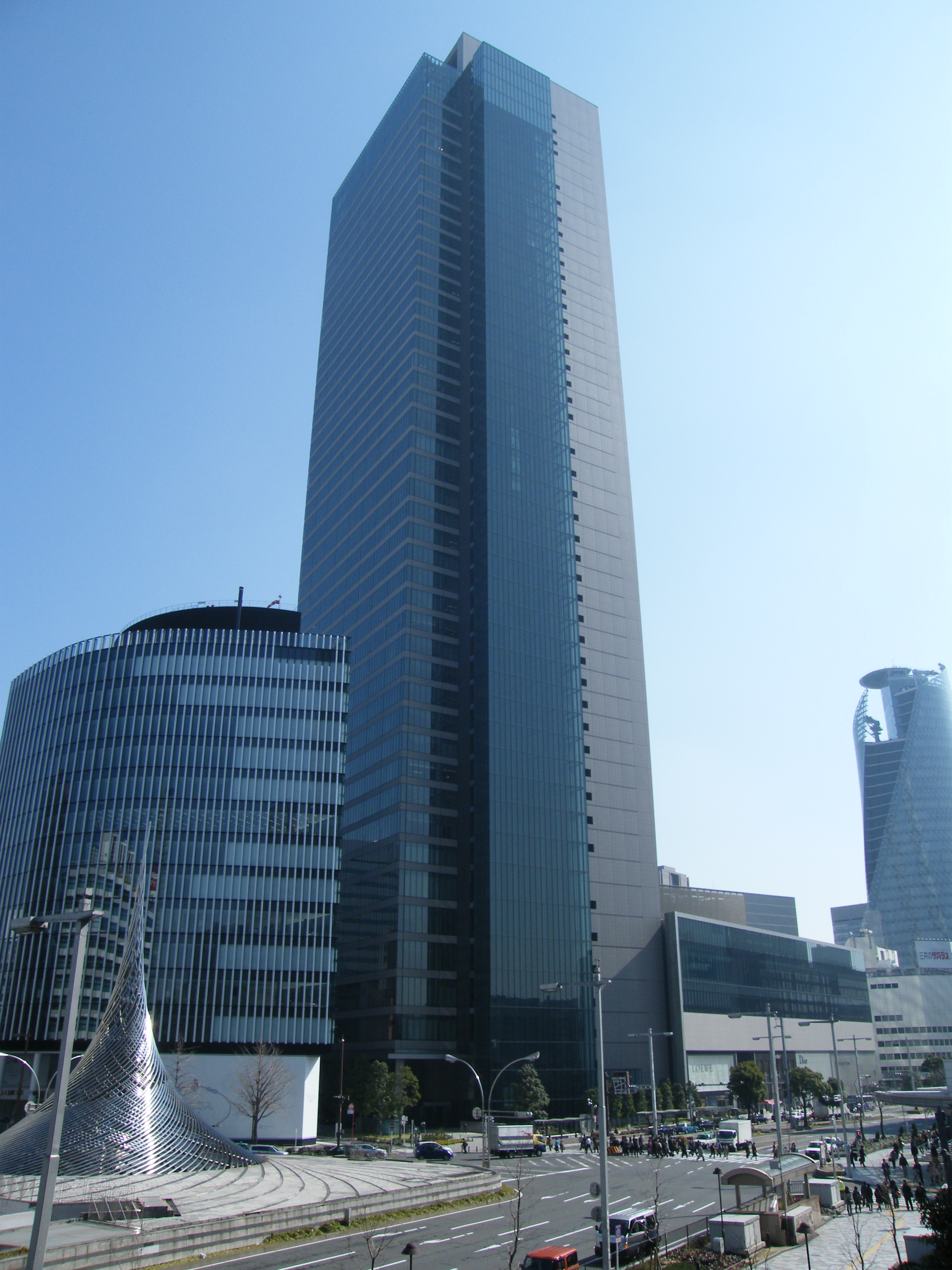
- Midland Square in Nagoya, Japan

General information
- Status: Completed
- Type: Office, retail
- Architectural style: Modern
- Location: 4-7-1 Meieki, Nakamura-ku, Nagoya, Aichi, Japan
- Coordinates: 35.1701279°N 136.8850511°E
- Current tenants: Toyota Motor Corporation, Towa Real Estate, and Mainichi Shimbun
- Construction started: January 2003; 23 years ago
- Completed: October 2006; 20 years ago
- Opened: March 2007; 19 years ago

Height
- Architectural: 247 metres (810 ft)
- Tip: 247 metres (810 ft)
- Roof: 237 metres (778 ft)

Technical details
- Floor count: 47
- Floor area: 193,451 m^{2}
- Lifts/elevators: 19

Design and construction
- Architect: Nikken Sekkei Ltd.
- Developer: Nikken Sekkei Ltd./Toyota Jidosha

Midland Square (ミッドランド スクエア), officially called Toyota-Mainichi Building (豊田・毎日ビルディング), is a skyscraper located in the Meieki district of Nakamura-ku, Nagoya, Aichi, Japan. It opened in early 2007. It is the tallest building in Nagoya and the ninth tallest building in Japan as of 2025. At 247 m (810 feet), it is slightly taller than the nearby JR Central Towers.

Midland Square houses offices of many companies including Toyota Motor Corporation, Towa Real Estate and Mainichi Shimbun. It features a shopping center with 60 name-brand stores, two automobile showrooms and a cinema. It also holds the record for the highest open-air observation deck in Japan. Also of note are the unusual double-floored elevators, which take only 40 seconds to rise to the top.

The name of the building derives from the Chūbu region (which means "central region") of which Nagoya is the capital.

== Gallery ==
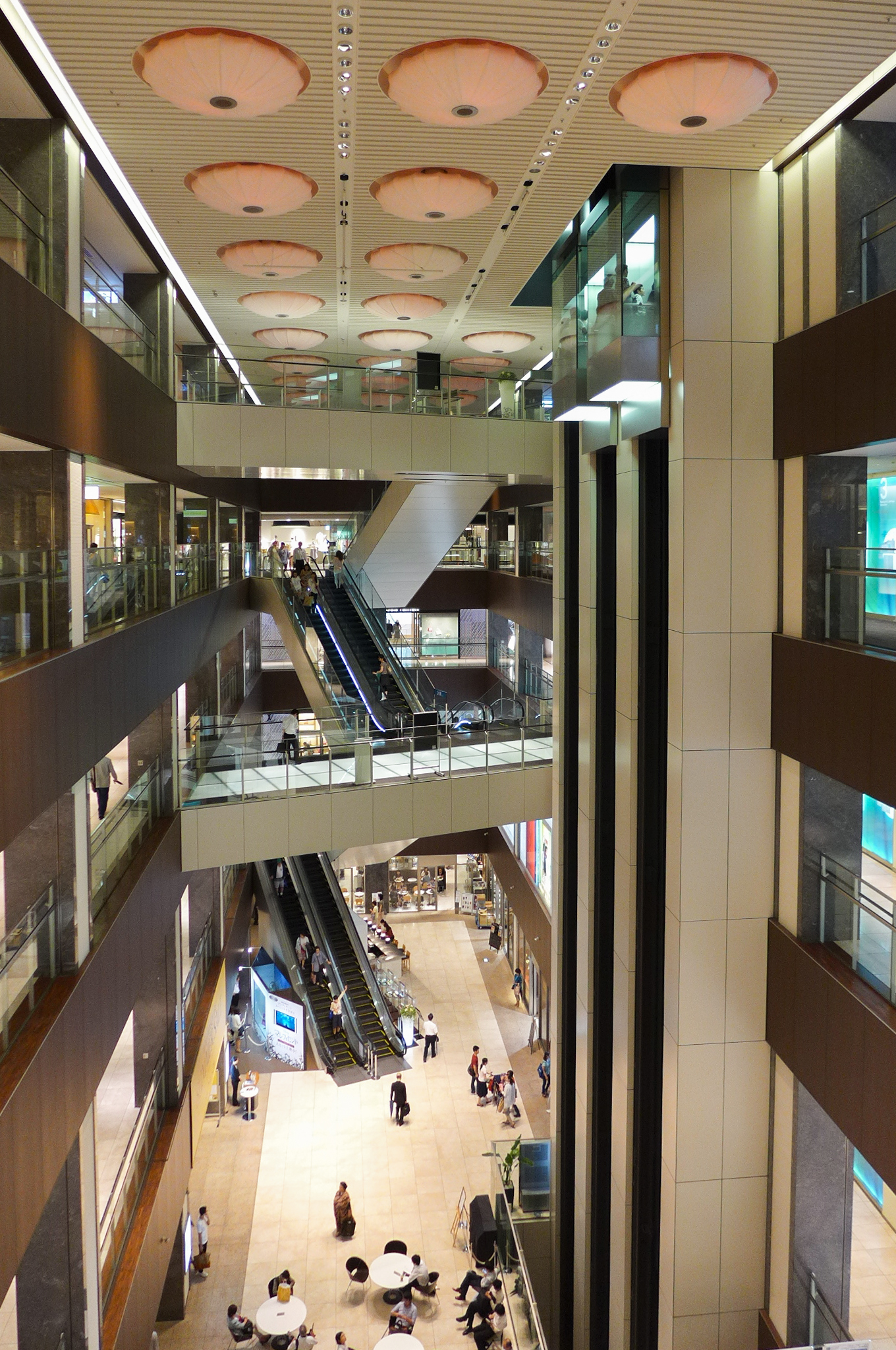
Shopping Arcade

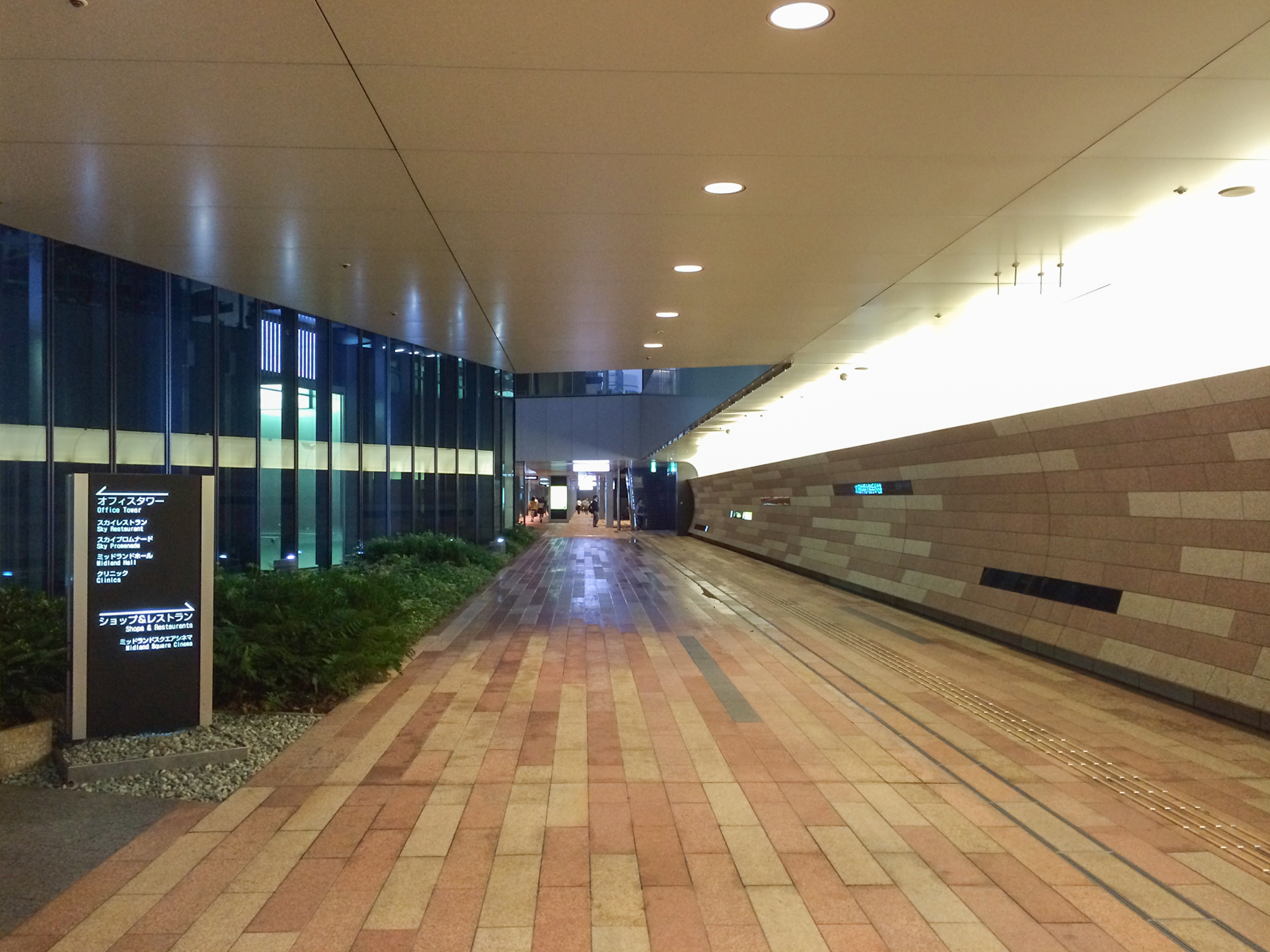
Basement Entrance

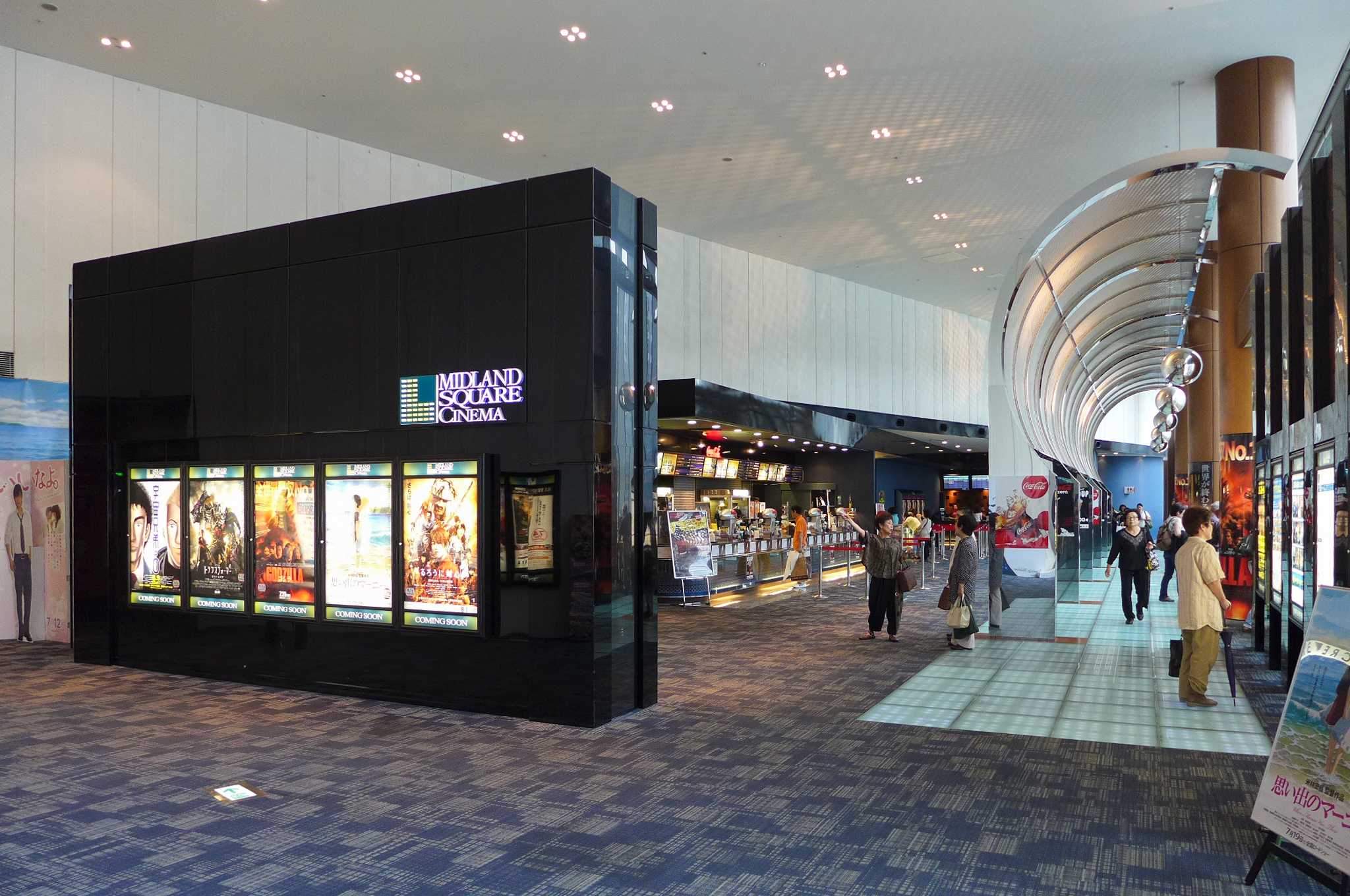
Midland Square Cinema

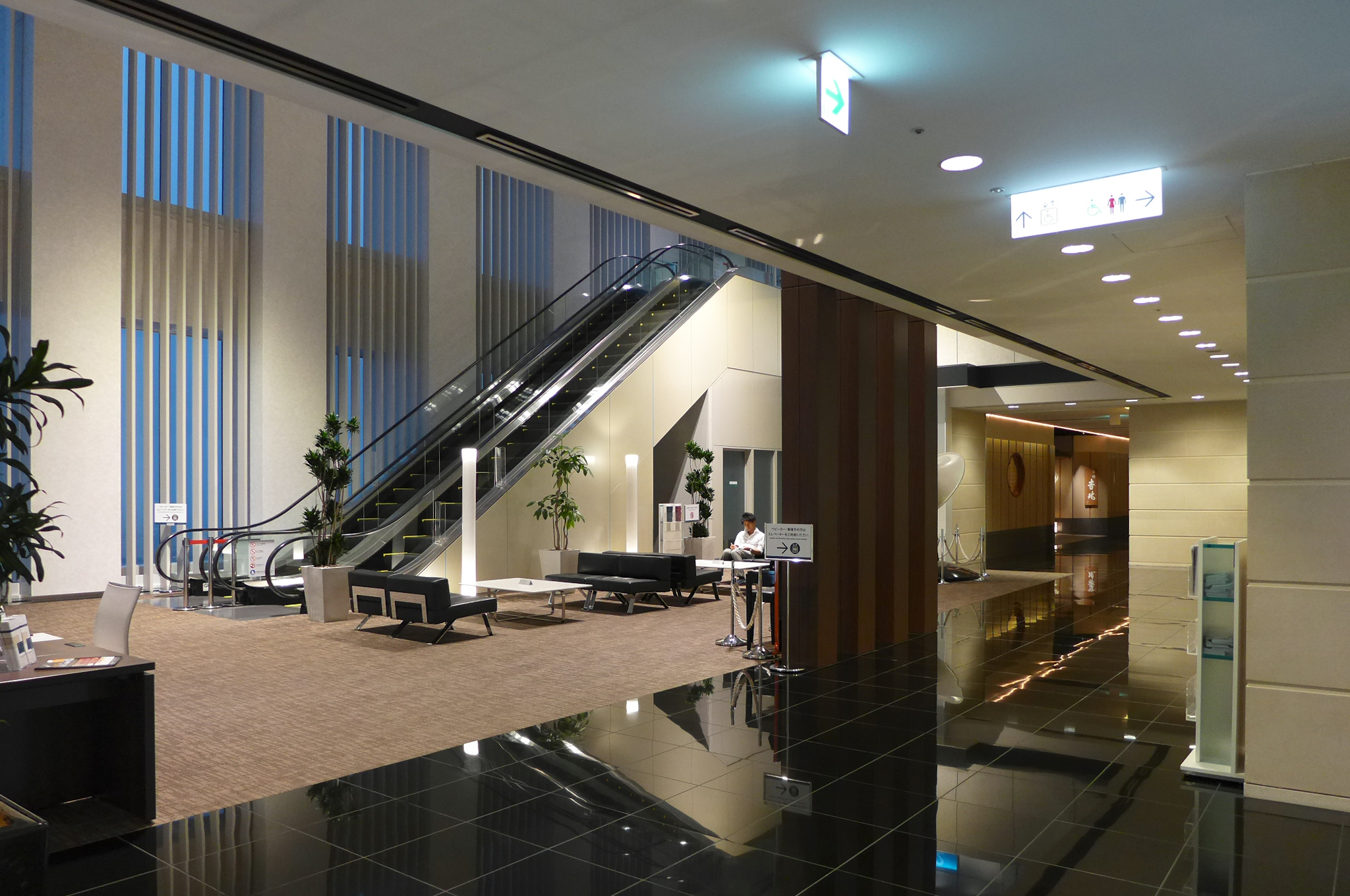
42/F Sky Lobby

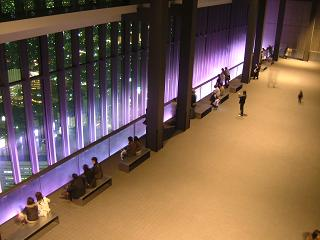
Sky Promenade

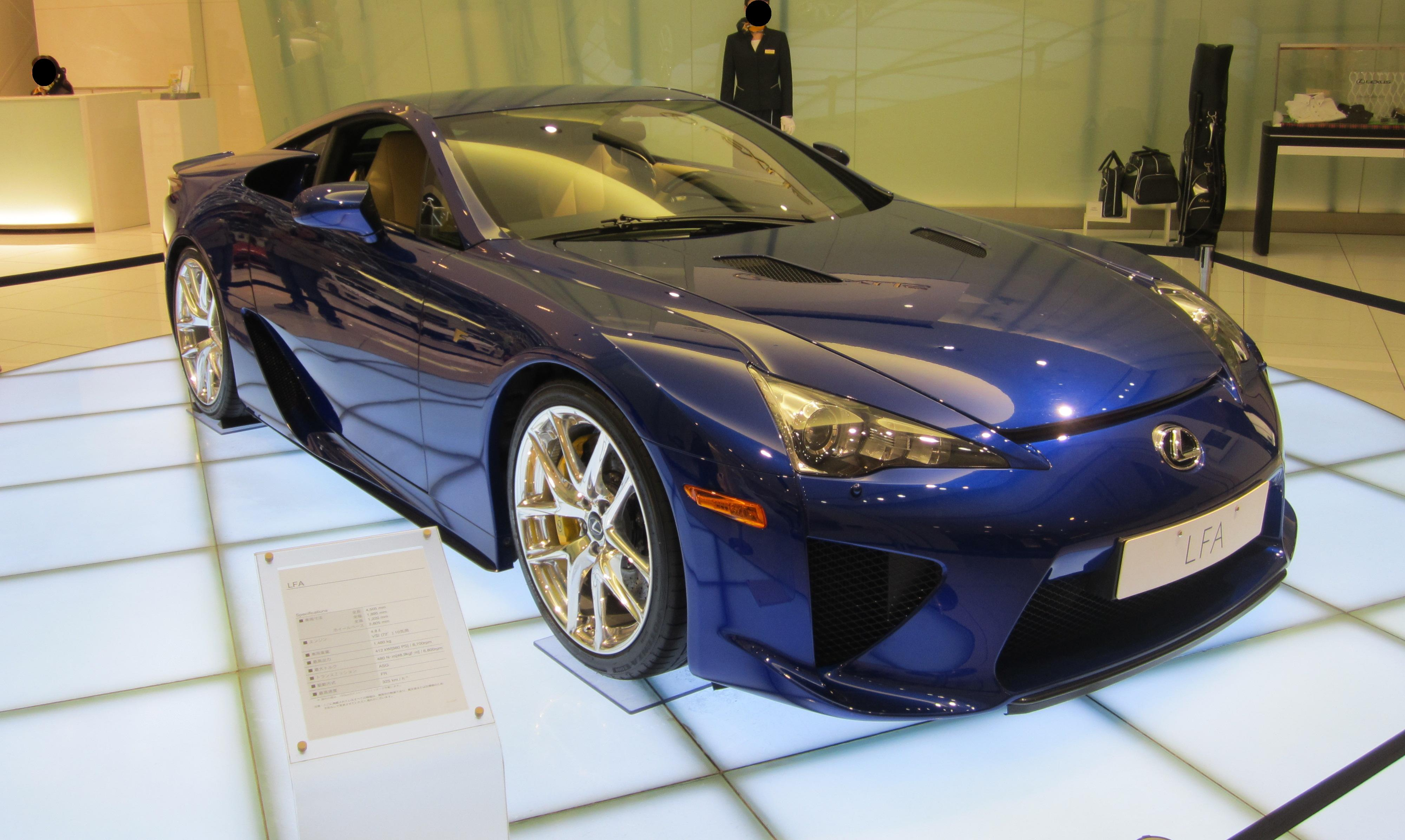
Lexus LFA in Midland Square
