= Conrad London St. James =

Hotel in Westminster, London, United Kingdom

- Location within Central London

General information
- Type: Hotel
- Location: 22-28 Broadway, London, United Kingdom
- Coordinates: 51.499542°N 0.132933°W
- Opened: 2014
- Owner: Hilton Worldwide

Other information
- Number of rooms: 256

Website
- Official website

Conrad London St. James is a hotel in Westminster, London. The hotel has 256 guest rooms. The hotel also has suites, a bar, fitness centre, 7 meeting rooms and a restaurant. The hotel has a 19th-century façade, being the former Queen Anne's Chamber, a Second World War-time residence of lobbyists and civil servants. The building was renovated in 2014 to be London's first Conrad Hotel, part of the Hilton Worldwide group. The interior features original art installations and a contemporary design. Artwork at the hotel includes Chris Levine's 'Lightness of Being' a holographic portrait of Queen Elizabeth II and a large sculpture entitled 'The House Always Wins' by Evil Ed and Dan Robotic.

== History ==
=== Queen Anne's Chambers ===
Built at the turn of the 20th century, Queen Anne's Chambers was a collection of chambers available for short to mid-term rent for those with a need to be close to the seat of power, being located very close to the Houses of Parliament. It was the war-time location in Westminster for those lobbyists and civil servants whose industries faced dramatic impact from the onset of war. One of the earliest tenants of note was The Brewers' Society, who between 1909 and 1917 took premises in Queen Anne's Chambers to engage government with its growing concern over the output of beer and imposed limits on the use of sugar in brewing at a time of rationing. In later years, the Treasury Solicitor was also based at Queen Anne's Chambers.

=== Hotel ===
The hotel was formerly an InterContinental hotel. Less than two years after it had opened, InterContinental surrendered the management of its second London property – InterContinental London Westminster. The hotel changed owernship and became the Conrad London St. James in September, 2014. The press release stated that the hotel would become the twenty-fourth Conrad hotel, and the first in London.

== Location ==
The hotel is located on Broadway, a street in London. It is directly opposite the St James's Park tube station and 55 Broadway.

== Restaurant ==
The hotel's restaurant is called the Pem. The Pem is named after suffragette Emily Wilding Davison's nickname. The restaurant is rated by the Michelin Guide. The menu and restaurant was headed by chef-director Sally Abé. In 2024, it was announced the head chef would be Jennifer Collins.

== Bar ==
The hotel's bar is called The Blue Boar, formerly the Blue Boar Smokehouse. Sally Abé opened the bar in 2021. In 2021, The Guardian's Grace Dent described it as "not really a pub at all, but a casual restaurant with a top chef".

== Division Bell ==
The hotel is situated within hearing distance of the Division Bell – the bell that tolls when there is a division in parliament, signalling that all members must return to vote.
