= Mode Gakuen Spiral Towers =

Educational facility in Nakamura-ku, Nagoya, Aichi, Japan

- モード学園スパイラルタワーズ
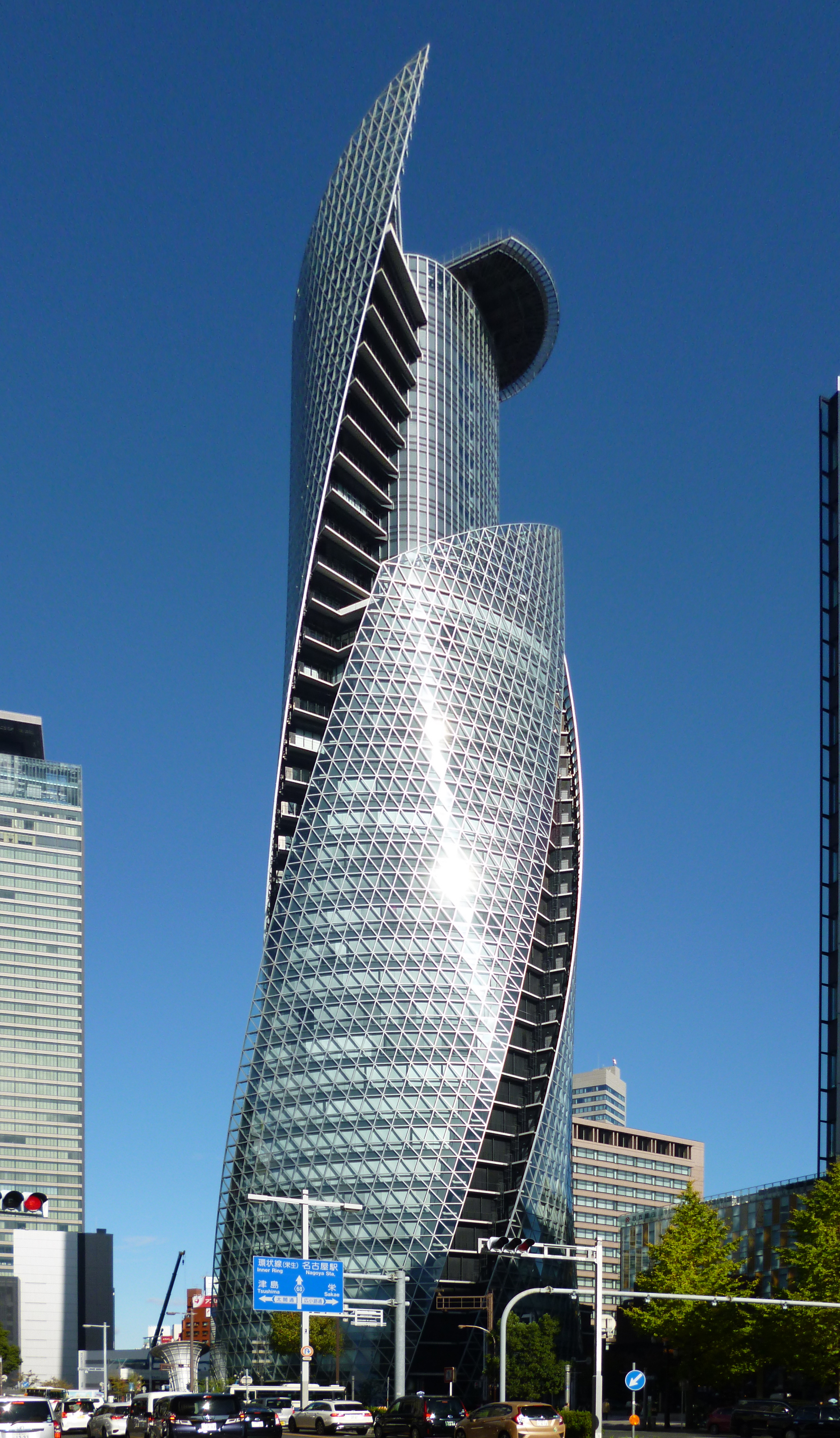
- Spiral tower

General information
- Location: 4-27 Meieki, Nakamura, Nagoya, Aichi, Japan
- Coordinates: 35°10′5″N 136°53′9″E
- Construction started: 2005
- Completed: 2008
- Opening: March 2008

Height
- Roof: 170 m (560 ft)

Technical details
- Floor count: 36 above ground 3 below ground

Design and construction
- Architect: Nikken Sekkei
- Developer: Nikken Sekkei
- Structural engineer: Nikken Sekkei
- Main contractor: Obayashi Corporation

Mode Gakuen Spiral Towers (モード学園スパイラルタワーズ, Mōdo gakuen supairaru tawāzu) is a 170-metre (558 ft), 36-story educational facility located in Nakamura-ku, Nagoya, Aichi, Japan. The building is home to three vocational schools: Nagoya Mode Gakuen, HAL Nagoya and Nagoya Isen.

It is one of the tallest buildings in Nagoya.

== See also ==
- List of tallest buildings in Nagoya
- List of twisted buildings
- Mode Gakuen Cocoon Tower
