= Broadway, London =

Street in the City of Westminster

Coordinates: 51°29′55″N 0°08′02″W

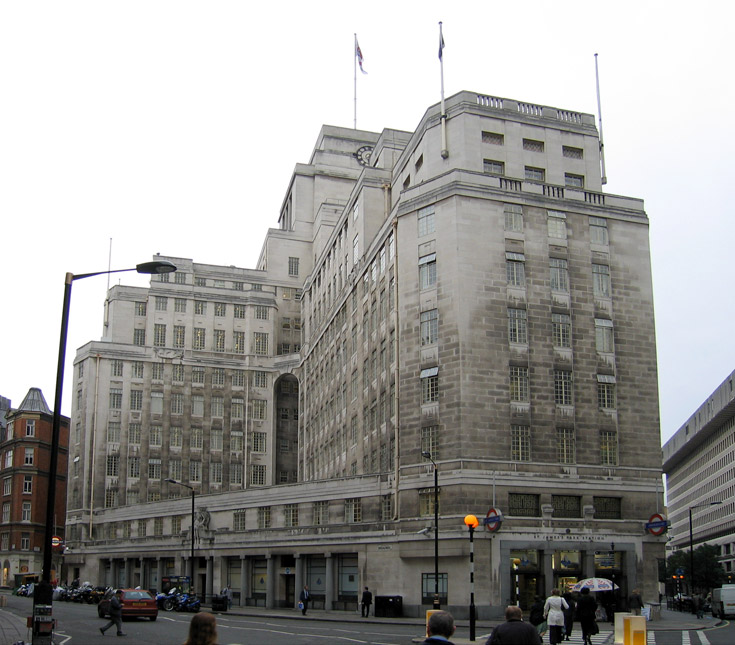
55 Broadway, Broadway side.

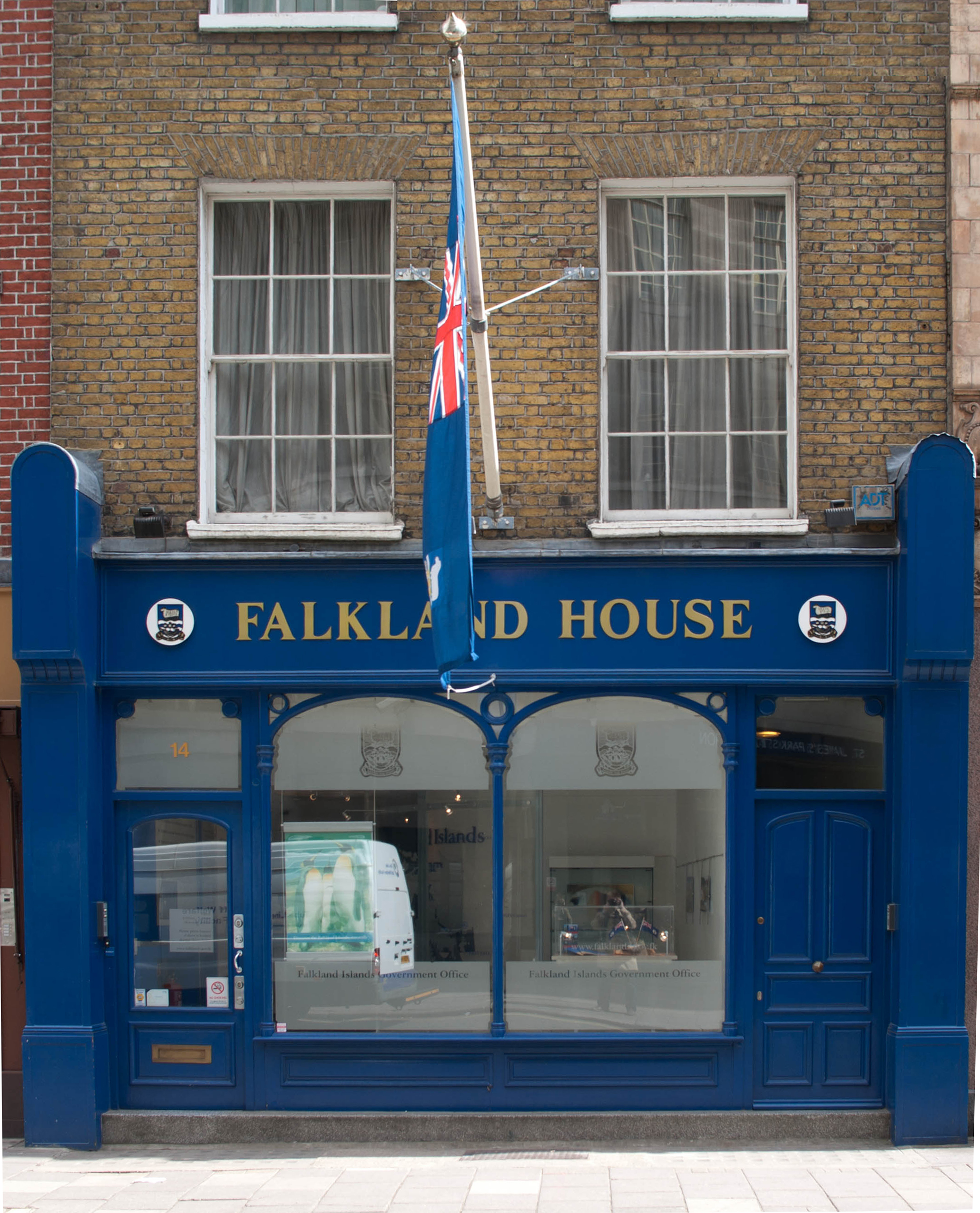
Falkland House

Broadway is a street in the City of Westminster that runs between Petty France, Queen Anne's Gate, Carteret Street and Tothill Street in the north and Victoria Street in the south. It is joined on the west side by St Ermin's Hill and Caxton Street, and on the east side by Dacre Street.

Notable buildings on the street include:

- Conrad London St. James, a hotel.
- Metropolitan Police's former headquarters (1967–2017), known as New Scotland Yard, at No. 10 (now demolished);
- Falkland House at No. 14, the Falkland Islands Government office in London.
- Equal Opportunities Commission at No. 36;
- The MI6 or Secret Intelligence Service's former operating base at 54 Broadway;
- 55 Broadway, on the corner with Petty France and including St James's Park Underground station. Designed by Eric Gill and grade I listed.
- Chartered Institute of Personnel and Development, at No. 151.
- St Ermin's Hotel, on the corner with Caxton Street which had strong connections with the British intelligence community. Grade II listed.

In March 1973, the Provisional IRA placed a car bomb outside the post office at No. 1, Broadway. It was defused before it exploded, but two other devices, one in Whitehall and another near the Old Bailey, exploded that day, killing one person who died from a heart attack attributed to the bombing, and injuring over 200.
