= The Landmark Nagoya Sakae =

Skyscraper in Nagoya, Japan

General information
- Status: Completed
- Type: Retail, Hotel, Office
- Location: Nagoya, Japan, 3 Chome-25-1 Nishiki, Naka
- Coordinates: 35°10′10″N 136°54′27″E
- Construction started: July 2022
- Completed: March 2026
- Cost: ¥14.9 Billion
- Owner: Conrad Hotels (partial)

Height
- Roof: 211.7 m (695 ft)

Technical details
- Structural system: All-Steel
- Floor count: 41 (+6 underground)
- Floor area: 109,700 m^{2} (1,180,000 sq ft)

Design and construction
- Architects: Mitsubishi Jisho Design; Takenaka Corporation
- Developer: Japan Post; Meiji Yasuda Life; Mitsubishi Estate; Chunichi Shimbun
- Structural engineer: Takenaka Corporation
- Main contractor: Takenaka Corporation

Other information
- Public transit: Nagoya Municipal Subway: Higashiyama; Meijō

The The Landmark Nagoya Sakae (ザ・ランドマーク名古屋栄, Za randomāku nagoya sakae) also known as Conrad Nagoya is a mixed-use skyscraper in the Naka district of Nagoya, Japan. Built between 2022 and 2026, the tower stands at 211.7 m (695 ft) tall with 41 floors and is the current 4th tallest building in Nagoya.

== History ==
=== Project ===
The building is directly connected to the Sakae Station and to the Nagoya Municipal Subway's Higashiyama Line and Meijō Line, and also connects to Daido Steel Phoenix Square (within Sakaechika). At 211.7 m (695 ft) tall, it has surpassed the Chunichi Building (158 m (518 ft)) to become the tallest building in the Sakae area. It has 41 floors above ground and 4 floors underground, with a total floor area of 109,679 m^{2} (1,180,000 sq ft). The design was executed by Mitsubishi Jisho Sekkei and Takenaka Corporation, with the latter also carriyng out the construction work. Construction began on July 1, 2022, and was completed on March 31, 2026. The inauguration of the building took place on June 11 of the same year. Entering stores and facilities other than the Toho Cinema was made by reservation until June 14, 2026.

Opened on June 11, 2026, it is a mixed-use commercial building with a hotel, offices, a cinema complex, commercial facilities, and parking. The project was named "Nishiki 3-chome Block 25 Project," and in its initial stages it was called "Nishiki 3-chome Block 25 Municipal Land Utilization Project".

In 2019, the city of Nagoya began soliciting business proposals for the "Nishiki 3-chome 25th Block City-Owned Land Utilization Project". This project aimed to enhance international competitiveness and improve the attractiveness of the area by utilizing city-owned land (Sakae Plaza) in the heart of the Sakae district. Following a review by the evaluation committee, in March 2020, a group led by Mitsubishi Estate (Mitsubishi Estate, Japan Post Real Estate, Meiji Yasuda Life Insurance, and Chunichi Shimbun) was selected as the project candidate. The runner-up was a group led by Sumitomo Corporation (Sumitomo Corporation, Nagoya Railroad, Chubu Electric Power, Meitetsu Real Estate, Nagoya Television Broadcasting, and SMFL Mirai Partners).

On May 20, 2020, the city of Nagoya announced its selection as the project candidate, with the land sale price set at approximately ¥14.9 billion. On June 8, 2022, it was certified by the Ministry of Land, Infrastructure, Transport and Tourism as an excellent private urban regeneration project.

=== Desing and construction ===
A groundbreaking ceremony was held on June 13, 2022, and construction began on July 1. A topping-out ceremony was held on February 5, 2025. The building was completed in March 2026, with the opening ceremony taking place in June of the same year. On September 13, 2021, the hotel was certified by Aichi Prefecture and Nagoya City as part of a subsidy program to promote the location of luxury hotels, further strengthening its position as a facility capable of handling international MICE events.

On July 24, 2024, the official name was decided to be "The Landmark Nagoya Sakae".

The design concept is called the "Sakae Urban Fabric", and it aims to be a new landmark in Nagoya, a value creation hub that weaves together the "world," "people," and "city." The facade design expresses the urban elements of Sakae as threads that "spin, weave, and wrap".

== Facilities ==
=== Floor configuration ===
- Basement 2nd floor - Above ground 4th floor : Commercial facility "HAERA" (operated by J. Front Retailing Group)
- 5th - 9th floors: Multiplex cinema (Toho Cinemas, first in the Sakae area)
- 10th-11th Floor: Conrad Nagoya Banquet Halls and Conference Rooms
- 12th floor: Sky Lobby (3-story atrium structure)
- 13th-14th floors: Coworking space, meeting rooms, library, private workspaces
- Floors 15-30: Office space (total leasable area approximately 2,500 m^{2} (26,900 sq ft), standard floor area approximately 1,600 m^{2} (17,200 sq ft))
- Floors 31-40: Conrad Nagoya (170 rooms)
- It also connects to the subway concourse and underground shopping area in three locations.

=== Commercial ===
Haera, a commercial facility operating on the second to fourth basement floors, scheduled to open on June 11, 2026. It is operated by J. Front Retailing and its group companies (Parco, Daimaru Matsuzakaya Department Store, and J. Front Urban Development). Positioned as a "luxury mall," the second, first, and fourth basement floors will feature food and beverage retailers and restaurants, while the first to third floors will primarily house fashion stores.

=== Cinena ===
The Cinemas Nagoya Sakae lobby

The Toho Cinemas Nagoya Sakae complex operates between the 5th and 9th floors, scheduled to open on June 11, 2026. It has 10 screens and 1,655 seats.

Prior to the opening of this theater, Toho Cinemas operated four theaters in Aichi Prefecture (Kisogawa in Ichinomiya City, Higashiura in Higashiura Town, Tsushima in Tsushima City, and Akaike in Nisshin City), but none remained in Nagoya City. This marks Toho's return to Nagoya City since the closure of Nagoya Bay City in 2020. Furthermore, this is the first time a TOHO-affiliated movie theater has returned to Nagoya's Sakae district since the closure of Angel Toho in 2005.

Cinema hall details
Screen	No. of seats (wheelchair seats in brackets)	Notes
1	115 seats（2w/c）	
2	160 seats（2w/c）	
3	264 seats（2w/c）	IMAX system
4	190 seats（2w/c）	Roaring Theater
5	96 seats（2w/c）	
6	115 seats（2w/c）	
7	160 seats（2w/c）	
8	268 seats（2w/c）	Eight of the seats in the premium theater are "Premium Luxury Seats".
9	190 seats（2w/c）	
10	97 seats（2w/c）	

=== Hotel ===
The Conrad Nagoya hotel, which opened on July 31, 2026, operates on the 10th-11th and 31st-40th floors. It is the third Conrad (Hilton's premium brand) hotel in Japan, following Conrad Tokyo and Conrad Osaka. The hotel has 170 guest rooms, with standard rooms measuring approximately 50 square meters. Of these, 29 are suites, the most luxurious "Conrad Suite" measuring approximately 213 m^{2} (2,290 sq ft).

There are six beverage establishments, including the Italian all-day dining restaurant "Casa Oliva," the lobby lounge "Sundrop," and the cafe and terrace "Songbird" on the 31st floor where the front lobby is located, and the Japanese restaurant (kaiseki cuisine and teppanyaki) "Soryu," the sushi restaurant "Souen," and the rooftop bar "House of Mon" on the top floor, the 40th floor. The 32nd floor will house a spa and fitness facility with four treatment rooms, an 18-meter indoor pool, a thermal pool, a sauna, and a gym. Three banquet and conference rooms will be located on the 10th and 11th floors.

== See also ==
- List of tallest buildings in Nagoya
- List of skyscrapers by floor area
