= List of tallest buildings in Nagoya =

Skyline of Nagoya
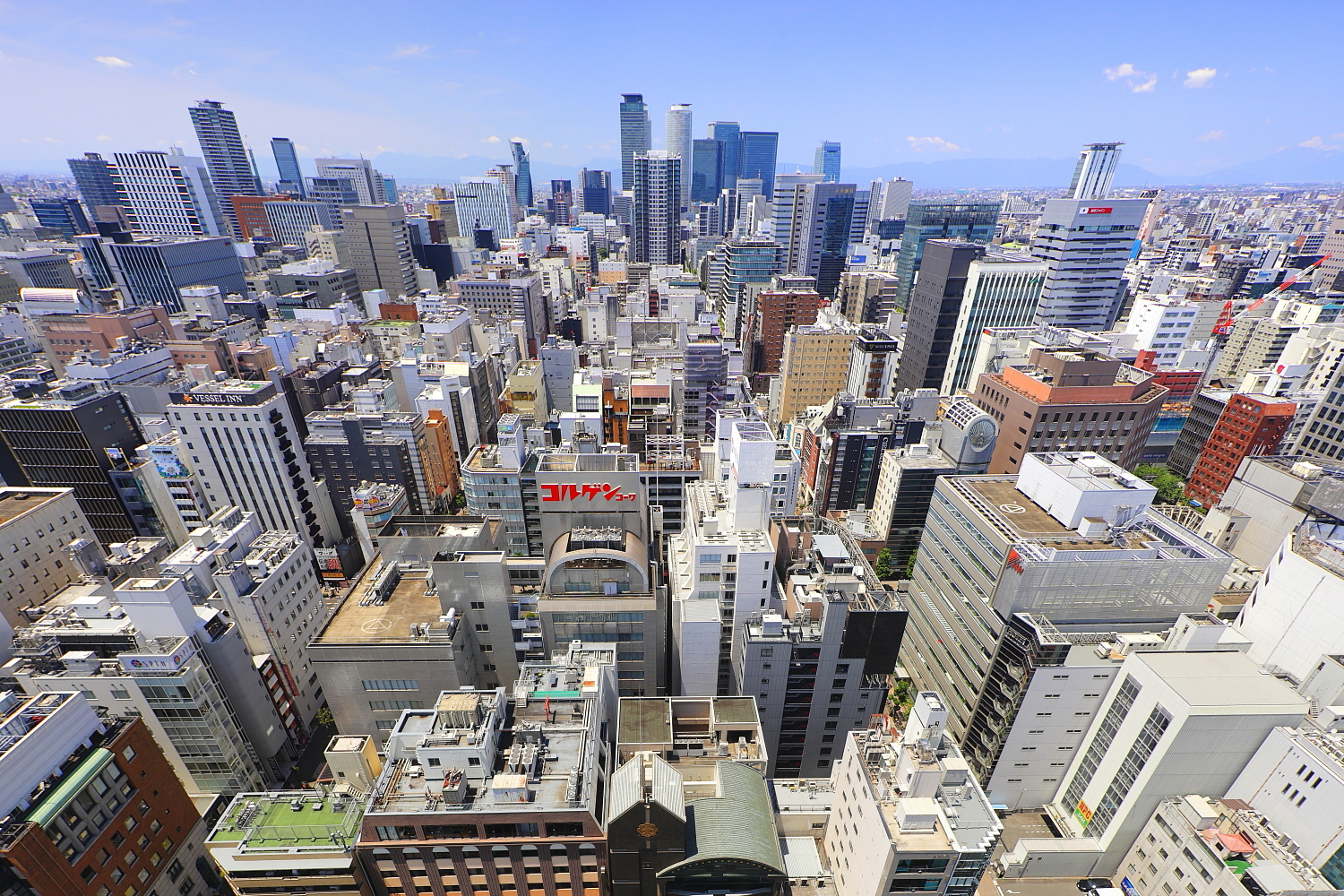
- Nagoya skyline, Meieki district from Sakae
- Tallest building: Midland Square (2006)
- Tallest building height: 247 m (810 ft)
- First 150 m+ building: The Scene Johoku (1996)

Number of tall buildings (2025)
- Taller than 100 m (328 ft): 37
- Taller than 150 m (492 ft): 14
- Taller than 200 m (656 ft): 4

This list of tallest buildings in Nagoya ranks buildings in Nagoya, Japan, by height. Nagoya is the fourth largest city in Japan by population, and the central city of the Chūkyō metropolitan area, the third largest in the country. As of March 2024, Nagoya has 4 skyscrapers above 200 meters (660 feet), 14 buildings above 150 meters (490 feet) and 37 buildings above 100 meters (330 feet).

Nagoya is a major economic and manufacturing centre of Japan. As the home to automaking giants Toyota, Honda, and Mitsubishi Motors, the city is the prime carmaker centre in the country. Other high-tech industries are also located there. The city also has the third busiest train station in the country. The strong industry base is one of the major driving forces in continuing to build and expand large office spaces. Most skyscrapers are located in the downtown area of Meieki, close to the main train station.

The oldest skyscraper in the city is the Sumitomo Life Nagoya Building, completed in 1974. The tallest building in Nagoya is currently the 247-metre-tall (810-foot) Midland Square, which was completed in 2006 and is also the eighth tallest skyscraper in Japan. The city's second tallest building is the JR Central Office Tower, built next to the Nagoya Station; it reaches 245 metres (804 ft) and was fully opened to the public in 1999. The Mode Gakuen Spiral Towers, completed in 2008, is noteworthy for its unusual spiral architectural structure, having established itself as a recognisable landmark.

A new 212 meter (696 ft) skyscraper tentatively named Nishiki 3-Chōme Block 25 is due to be completed in 2026 as Nagoya's fifth tallest building.

== Tallest buildings ==
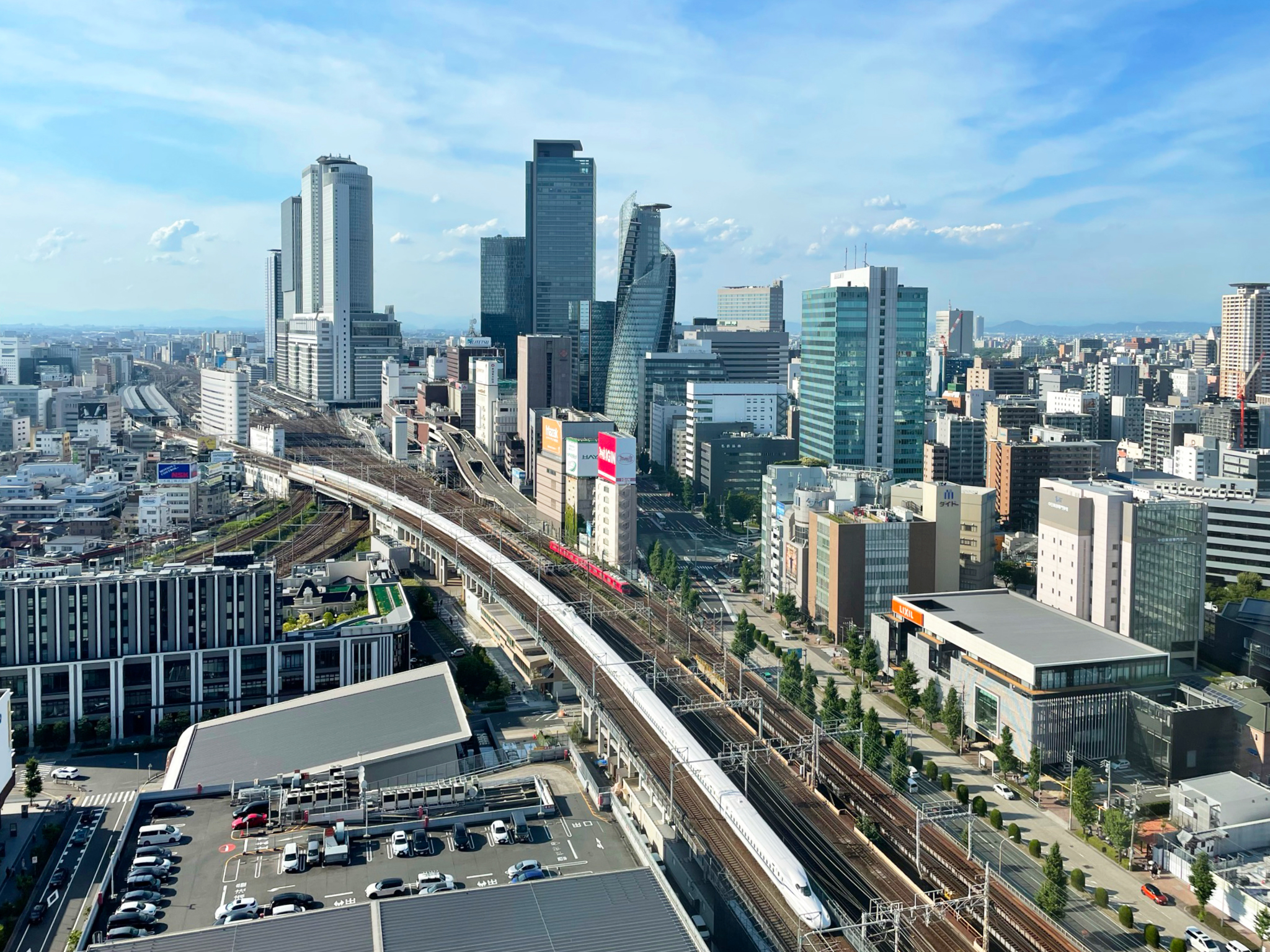
Nagoya skyline around the Nagoya Station

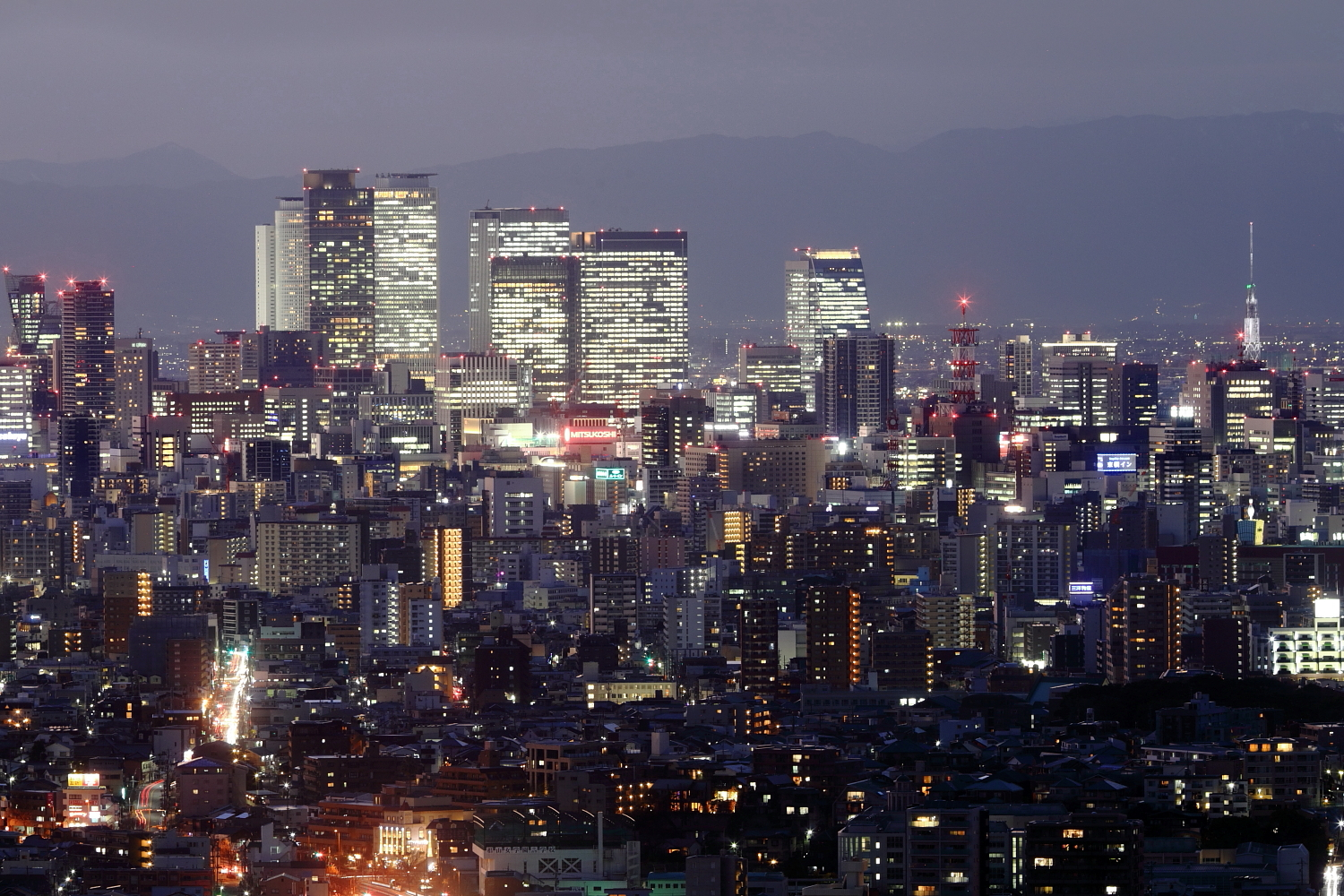
Nagoya skyline at night

Was the tallest building in Nagoya upon completion
Indicates non-habitable or partially habitable structures, such as freestanding towers or smokestacks, as well as buildings with masts or towers

This list ranks Nagoya's skyscrapers that stand at least 100 m (328 ft) tall, based on standard height measurement. This includes spires and architectural details but does not include antenna masts. An equal sign (=) following a rank indicates the same height between two or more buildings.

Rank	Name	Image	Location	Height m (ft)	Floors	Year	Notes
1	Midland Square		Nakamura-ku; 35.17012°N 136.88505°E	247 (810)	47	2006	Tallest building in Nagoya.; Tallest building in Aichi Prefecture.
2	JR Central Office Tower		Nakamura-ku; 35°10′17″N 136°52′58″E	245 (804)	51	1999	Tallest building in Nagoya between 1999 and 2006.
3	JR Central Hotel Tower		Nakamura-ku; 35°10′17″N 136°52′58″E	226 (741)	53	1999	
4	The Landmark Nagoya Sakae		Naka-ku; 35.16971°N 136.90745°E	211.7 (695)	41	2026	Tallest building in the Naka-ku ward.
5	JR Gate Tower		Nakamura-ku; 35.17220°N 136.88260°E	211.1 (693)	46	2016	
6	JP Tower Nagoya		Nakamura-ku; 35.17310°N 136.88215°E	196 (642)	40	2015	
7	Nagoya Lucent Tower		Nishi-ku; 35°10′31″N 136°52′52″E	180 (591)	40	2007	Tallest building in the Nishi-ku ward.
ｰ	Nagoya TV Tower		Naka-ku; 35°10′20.7″N 136°54′30″E	180 (591)	5	1954	
8	Dai-Nagoya Building		Nakamura-ku; 35.17199°N 136.88452°E	175 (574)	34	2015	
9=	Mode Gakuen Spiral Towers		Nakamura-ku; 35°10′5″N 136°53′9″E	170 (558)	36	2008	
9=	Global Gate Sky Tower		Nakamura-ku; 35.16216°N 136.88340°E	170 (558)	36	2017	
11	The Lions Mid Capital Tower		Atsuta-ku; 35.13484°N 136.90980°E	162 (531)	47	2009	Tallest building in the Atsuta-ku ward.
12=	The Scene Johoku		Kita-ku; 35.21655°N 136.91271°E	160 (524)	45	1996	Tallest building in Nagoya between 1996 and 1999.; Tallest building in the Kita-ku ward.
13=	Grand Maison Misonoza Tower		Naka-ku; 35.16701°N 136.89698°E	160 (524)	41	2017	
14	Chunichi Building		Naka-ku; 35.16834°N 136.90952°E	159 (521)	33	2023	
15	Grand Maison Ikeshita the Tower		Chikusa-ku; 35.16790°N 136.94743°E	153 (501)	42	2013	Tallest building in the Chikusa-ku ward.
16	Nagoya the Tower		Nakamura-ku; 35.16401°N 136.88989°E	149 (489)	42	2023	
17	Kanayama Minami Building		Naka-ku; 35.142565°N 136.90043°E	135 (441)	31	1998	
ｰ	Higashiyama Sky Tower		Chikusa-ku; 35.15676°N 136.97887°E	134 (440)	7	1989	
18	Loisir Hotel Toyohashi		Toyohashi; 34.7434°N 137.37091°E	120 (393)	30	1990	Tallest building in Nagoya between 1990 and 1996.
19	Aqua Town Nayabashi		Nakamura-ku; 35.16853°N 136.89116°E	118 (386)	33	2006	
20	Alpen Marunouchi Tower		Naka-ku; 35.17603°N 136.89713°E	116 (380)	25	2007	
21	Symphony Toyota Building		Nakamura-ku; 35.16983°N 136.88686°E	115 (377)	25	2016	
22	Nadya Park		Naka-ku; 35.16546°N 136.90516°E	114 (373)	23	1996	
23=	Cittanapoli Tower		Minamichita; 34.71630°N 136.97174°E	111 (364)	34	1994	
23=	Hilton Nagoya		Naka-ku; 35.16767°N 136.89452°E	111 (364)	25	1989	
25=	Proud Tower Nagoya Nishiki		Naka-ku; 35.17202°N 136.89911°E	110 (361)	30	2022	
25=	Sky Stage33		Komaki; 35.30237°N 136.98373°E	110 (361)	33	1991	
27	Axios Chikusa		Naka-ku; 35.16942°N 136.92855°E	108 (356)	31	2004	
28=	Nagoya Prime Central Tower		Nishi-ku; 35.17581°N 136.88534°E	106 (348)	23	2009	
28=	Nagoya Prime Central Tower; Axios Grand Suite			106 (348)	23	2009	
30	Okazaki Tower Residence		Okazaki; 34.95890°N 137.16081°E	105 (344)	31	2008	
31	Nagoya Center Tower		Naka-ku; 35.15613°N 136.90799°E	103 (338)	29	2008	
32=	Sumitomo Life Nagoya Building		Nakamura-ku; 35.16538°N 136.88639°E	102 (334)	26	1974	Tallest building in Nagoya between 1974 and 1990.
32=	Nagoya International Center		Nakamura-ku; 35.17281°N 136.89029°E	102 (334)	26	1984	
34=	Urbanet Nagoya Building		Higashi-ku; 35.17317°N 136.90920°E	101 (332)	22	2005	
34=	Grand-Suite Chikusa Tower		Chikusa-ku; 35.16235°N 136.92630°E	101 (332)	30	2010	
34=	Sakae Tower Hills		Naka-ku; 35.16303°N 136.90251°E	101 (332)	28	2019	
37=	Vique Tower Nagoya Higashibetsuin		Naka-ku; 35.15034°N 136.90433°E	100 (328)	29	2013	
37=	City Tower Nagoya Hisaya-Odori Koen		Higashi-ku; 35.17672°N 136.90928°E	100 (328)	31	2012	

== Tallest under construction or proposed ==
=== Under construction ===
The following list shows buildings that are under construction in Nagoya and are planned to rise at least 100 metres (330 ft). Any buildings that have been topped out but are not completed are also included.

Name	Height m (ft)	Floors	Year	Notes
Nishiki 3-Chōme Block 25	212 (695)	41	2026	
Grand Maison Ikeshita the Tower II	136 (446)	39	2025	
Grand Maison Sakae 2-Chōme	107 (350)	30	2028	
Meiji Yasuda Life Nagoya Station Building Redevelopment Project	100 (328)	20	2026	
S2 Project	100 (328)	19	2026	

== See also ==
- List of tallest buildings in Japan
