= Conrad Hotels =

American luxury hotel chain

Conrad Hotels & Resorts
- Type: Subsidiary
- Industry: Hospitality
- Founded: 1985; 41 years ago
- Headquarters: McLean, Virginia, United States
- Number of locations: 42 (December 31, 2021)
- Area served: Worldwide
- Services: Hotels
- Parent: Hilton Worldwide
- Website: conradhotels.com

Conrad Hotels & Resorts is an American multinational brand of high-end luxury hotels and high-end luxury resorts owned and operated by Hilton Worldwide.

== History ==
Barron Hilton, son of Conrad Hilton, founded Conrad Hotels, taking the name from that of his father. Conrad Hotels was, at the time, a separate company from Hilton International, and could not operate hotels outside the United States under the Hilton name. The newly named chain solved that problem. Hilton International had already started their own chain of Vista Hotels within the United States, as they faced the same prohibition on operating there under the Hilton name. The first Conrad hotel, the Conrad Jupiters Gold Coast in Australia, opened its doors in 1985.

When the two Hilton chains were rejoined in 2005, the need for the Vista and Conrad names vanished. Vista was phased out, while the Conrad brand was retained as a luxury wing of Hilton. Numerous hotels have since been opened under that name in the United States and elsewhere. Conrad was considered the luxury flagship brand in the Hilton Family of Brands, until being supplanted by The Waldorf-Astoria Collection in 2006.

== Properties ==
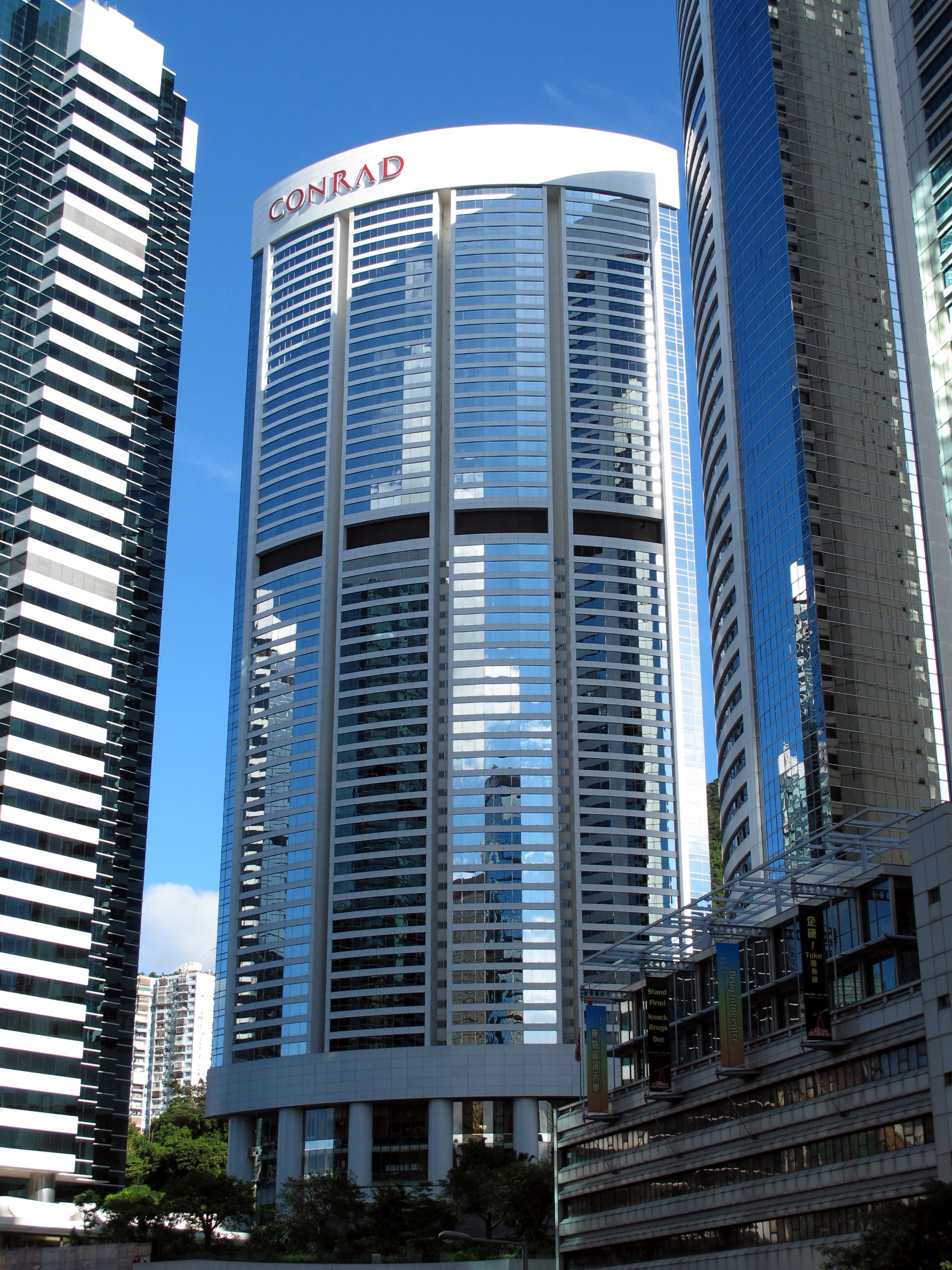
Conrad Hong Kong

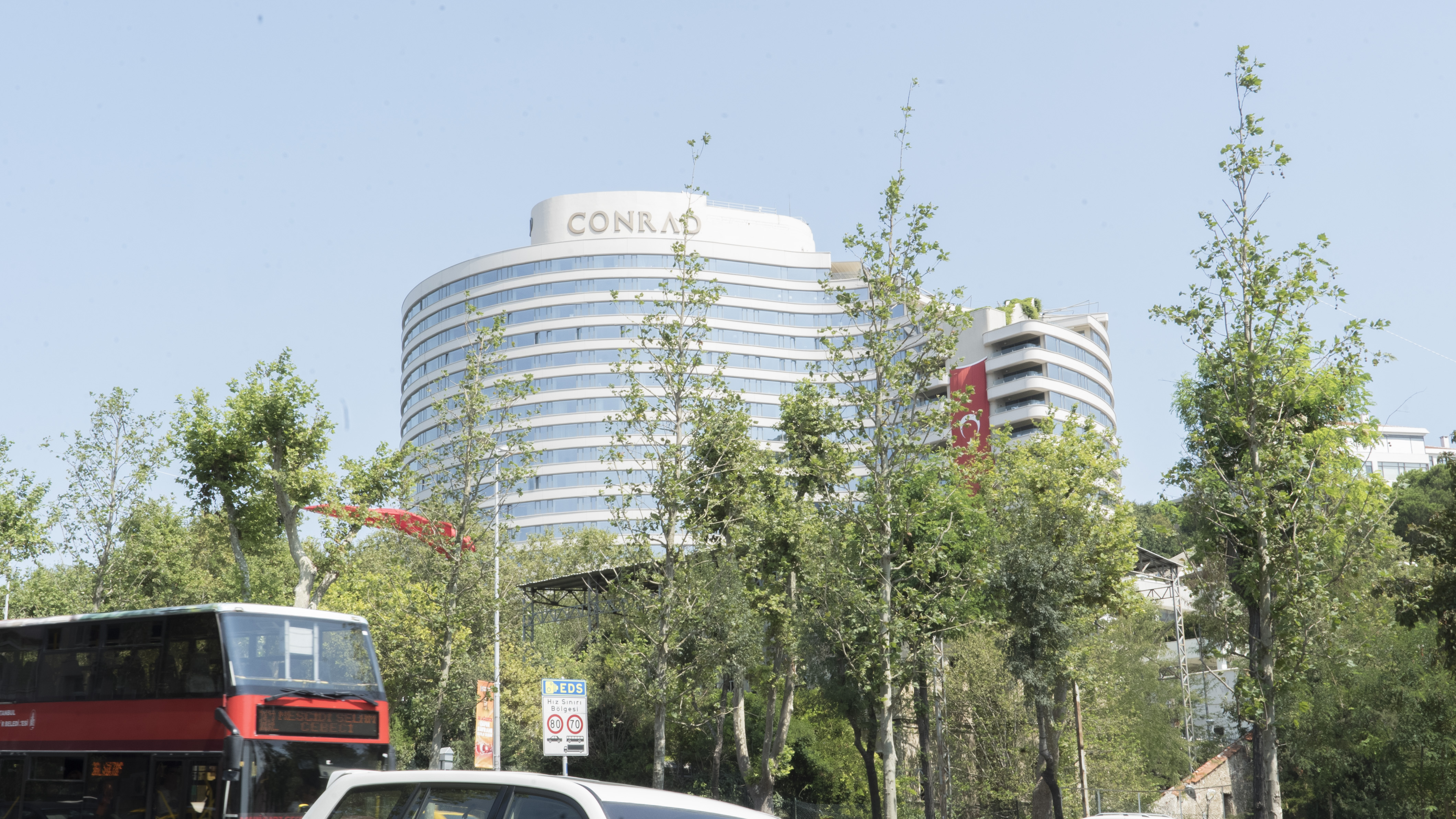
Conrad Istanbul Bosphorus

Conrad Manila

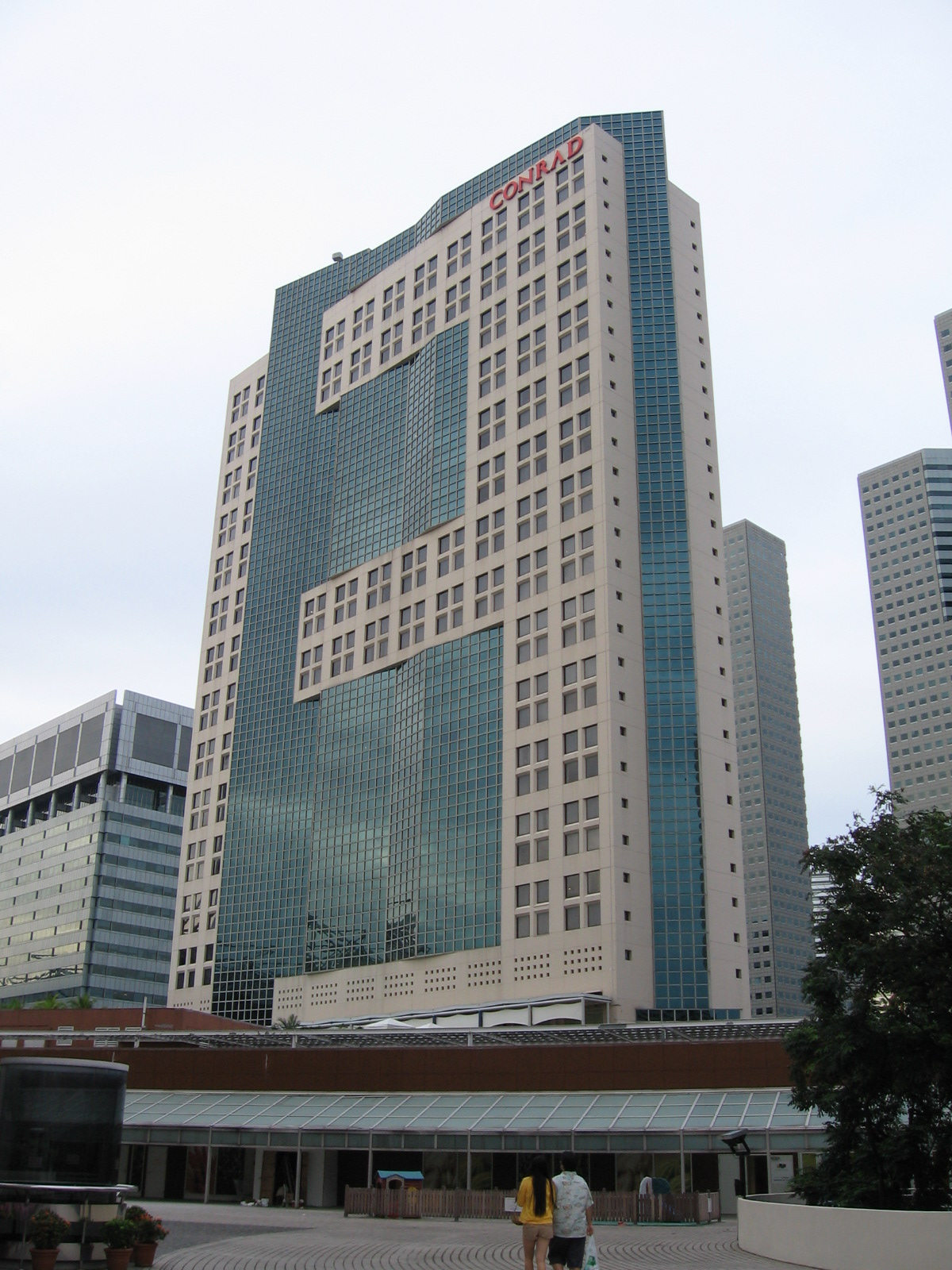
Conrad Singapore Marina Bay

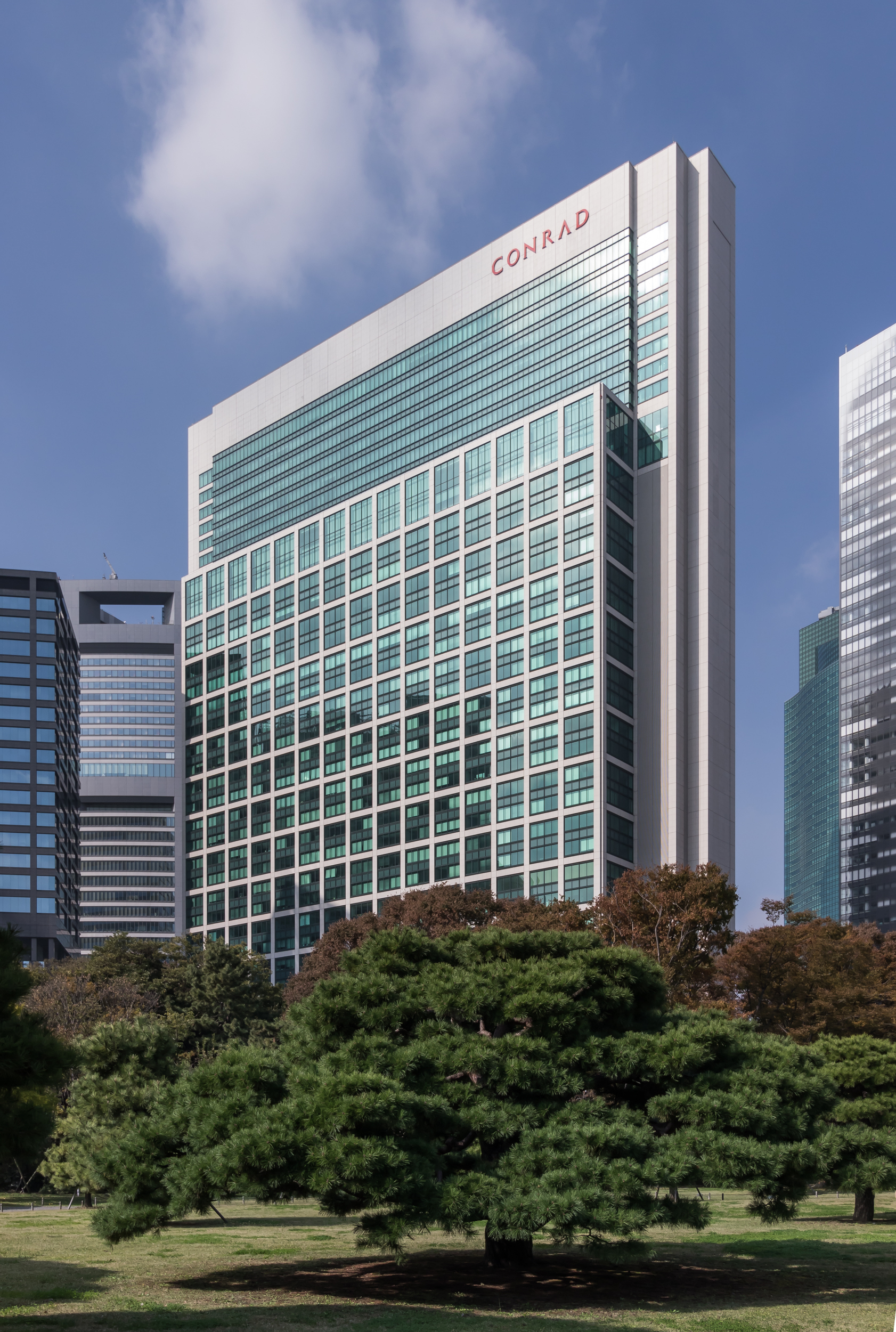
Conrad Tokyo

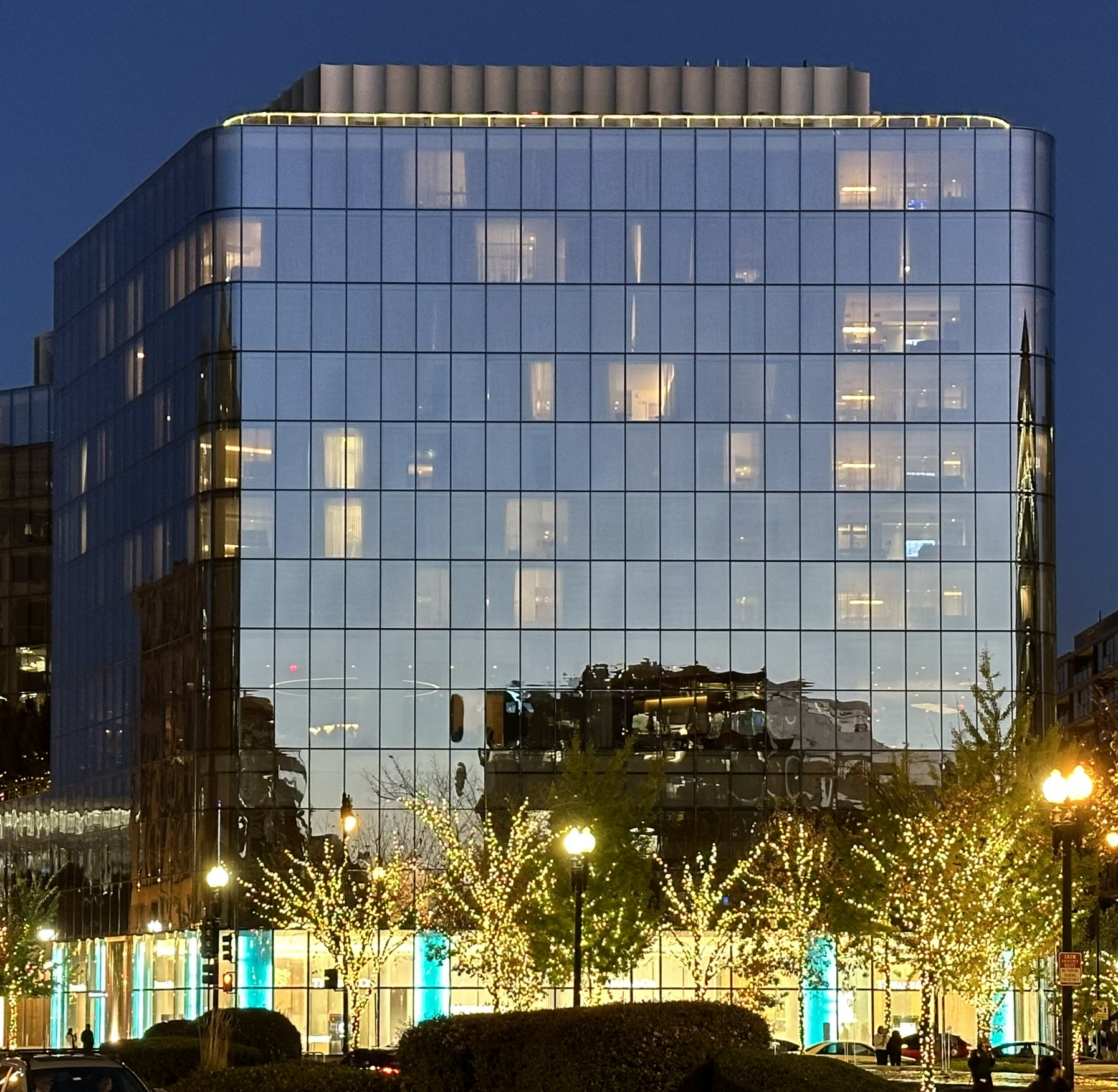
Conrad Washington, D.C.

Present properties
Name	Location	Country/Territory	Opened
Conrad Abu Dhabi Etihad Towers	Abu Dhabi	United Arab Emirates	2020
Conrad Algarve	Algarve	Portugal	2012
Conrad Athens The Ilisian	Athens	Greece	2026
Conrad Bahrain Financial Harbour	Manama	Bahrain	2024
Conrad Bali	Bali	Indonesia	2004
Conrad Bangkok	Bangkok	Thailand	2003
Conrad Beijing	Beijing	China	2013
Conrad Bengaluru	Bengaluru	India	2018
Conrad Bora Bora Nui	Bora Bora	(France) French Polynesia	2017
Conrad Chia Laguna Sardinia	Sardinia	Italy	2022
Conrad Chongqing	Chongqing	China	2024
Conrad Dalian	Dalian	China	2012
Conrad Dubai	Dubai	United Arab Emirates	2013
Conrad Dublin	Dublin	Ireland	1989
Conrad Fort Lauderdale Beach	Fort Lauderdale	United States	2017
Conrad Guangzhou	Guangzhou	China	2017
Conrad Hamburg	Hamburg	Germany	2025
Conrad Hangzhou	Hangzhou	China	2019
Conrad Hangzhou Tonglu	Hangzhou	China	2019
Conrad Hong Kong	Hong Kong	(China) Hong Kong	1990
Conrad Indianapolis	Indianapolis	United States	2006
Conrad Istanbul Bosphorus	Istanbul	Turkey	1992
Conrad Jiuzhaigou	Jiuzhaigou	China	2021
Conrad Koh Samui	Ko Samui	Thailand	2011
Conrad Las Vegas at Resorts World	Las Vegas	United States	2021
Conrad London St. James	London	United Kingdom	2014
Conrad Los Angeles	Los Angeles	United States	2022
Conrad Macao	Macau	(China) Macau	2012
Conrad Makkah	Mecca	Saudi Arabia	2016
Conrad Maldives Rangali Island	Rangali	Maldives	2007
Conrad Manila	Manila	Philippines	2016
Conrad Nagoya	Nagoya	Japan	2026
Conrad Nashville	Nashville	United States	2022
Conrad New York Downtown	New York City	United States	2012
Conrad Orlando	Orlando	United States	2024
Conrad Osaka	Osaka	Japan	2017
Conrad Pune	Pune	India	2016
Conrad Punta de Mita	Punta Mita	Mexico	2020
Conrad Rabat Arzana	Rabat	Morocco	2022
Conrad Riyadh Laysen Valley	Riyadh	Saudi Arabia	2026
Conrad Seoul	Seoul	South Korea	2012
Conrad Shanghai	Shanghai	China	2022
Conrad Shenyang	Shenyang	China	2019
Conrad Shenzhen	Shenzhen	China	2023
Conrad Singapore Marina Bay	Central Area	Singapore	1996
Conrad Singapore Orchard	Central Area	Singapore	2023
Conrad Tianjin	Tianjin	China	2019
Conrad Tokyo	Tokyo	Japan	2005
Conrad Tulum Riviera Maya	Tulum	Mexico	2022
Conrad Urumqi	Urumqi	China	2021
Conrad Washington DC	Washington, D.C.	United States	2019
Conrad Xiamen	Xiamen	China	2016

Future properties
Name	Location	Country/Territory	Projected opening year
Conrad Corfu	Corfu	Greece	2026
Conrad Hoi An	Hoi An	Vietnam	2030
Conrad Jaipur	Jaipur	India	2027
Conrad Jakarta	Jakarta	Indonesia	2029
Conrad Kuala Lumpur	Kuala Lumpur	Malaysia	2026
Conrad Meia Praia Algarve	Algarve	Portugal	2027
Conrad Nanjing	Nanjing	China	2027
Conrad Phu Quoc	Phu Quoc	Vietnam	2027
Conrad Qingcheng Mountain	Chengdu	China	2027
Conrad Xi'an	Xi'an	China	2027
Conrad Yokohama	Yokohama	Japan	2027
Conrad Zhoushan	Zhoushan	China	2028

Former properties
Name	Location	Country/Territory	Closed
Conrad Brussels	Brussels	Belgium	2012
