= JR Central Towers =

Skyscraper complex in Japan

Coordinates: 35°10′17″N 136°52′58″E

- JRセントラルタワーズ
- JR Central Towers

General information
- Status: Completed
- Type: Office, retail
- Elevation: Office Tower: 245.1m Hotel Tower: 226.0m

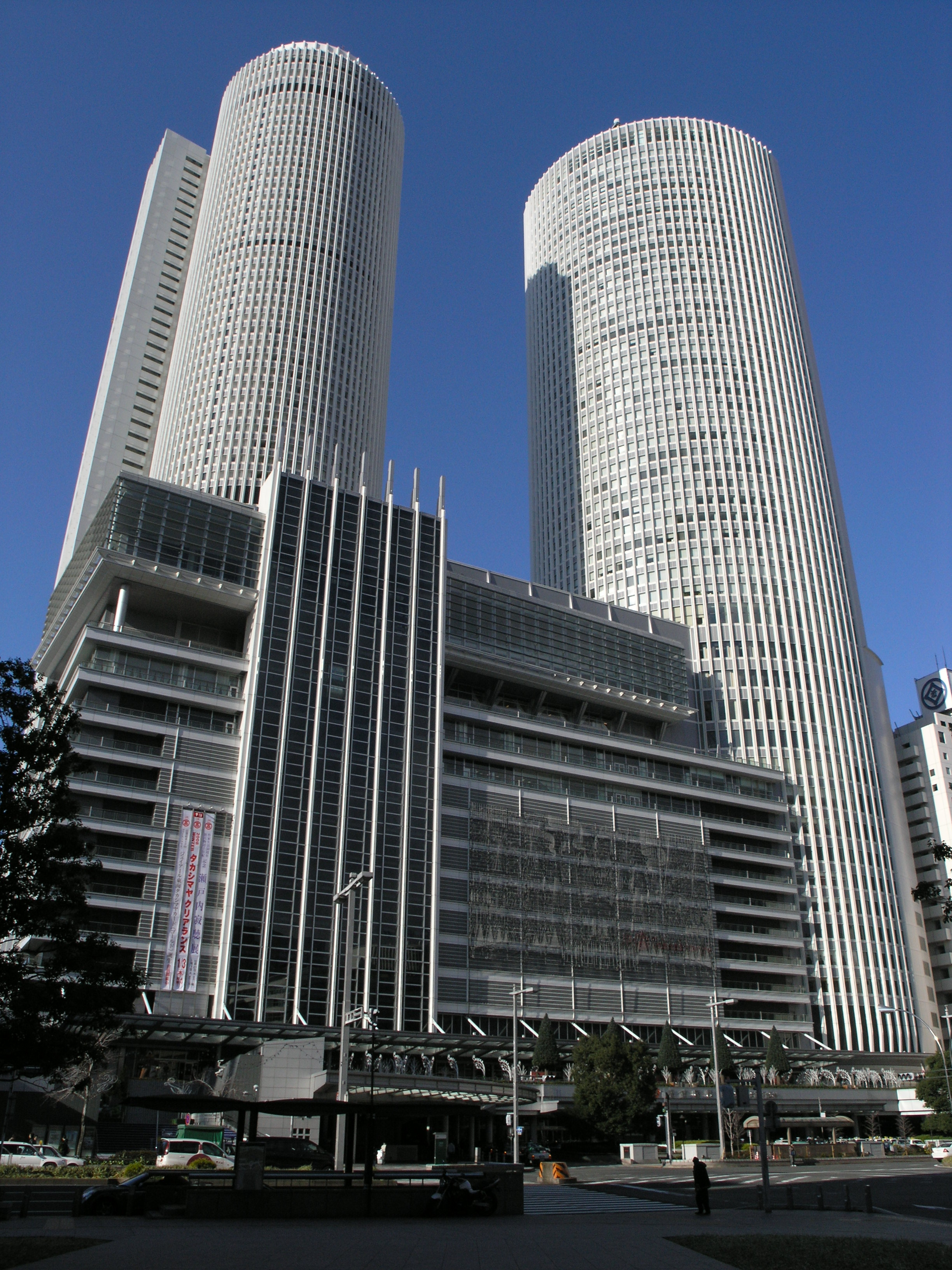
JR Central Towers

The JR Central Towers are in Nakamura-ku in the city of Nagoya, central Japan. It is located right above Nagoya Station and serves as the headquarters of the Central Japan Railway Company. Opened in December 1999, it is the second-tallest building in Nagoya, and eighth-tallest overall in Japan as of 2015. It is one of the world's largest train station complexes by floor area. The complex was designed by Kohn Pedersen Fox Associates and Taisei Corporation.

The office tower is slightly taller than the hotel tower.

Takashimaya and the Nagoya Marriott Associa Hotel are in the towers.

== History ==
The construction of the building was completed in December 1999.

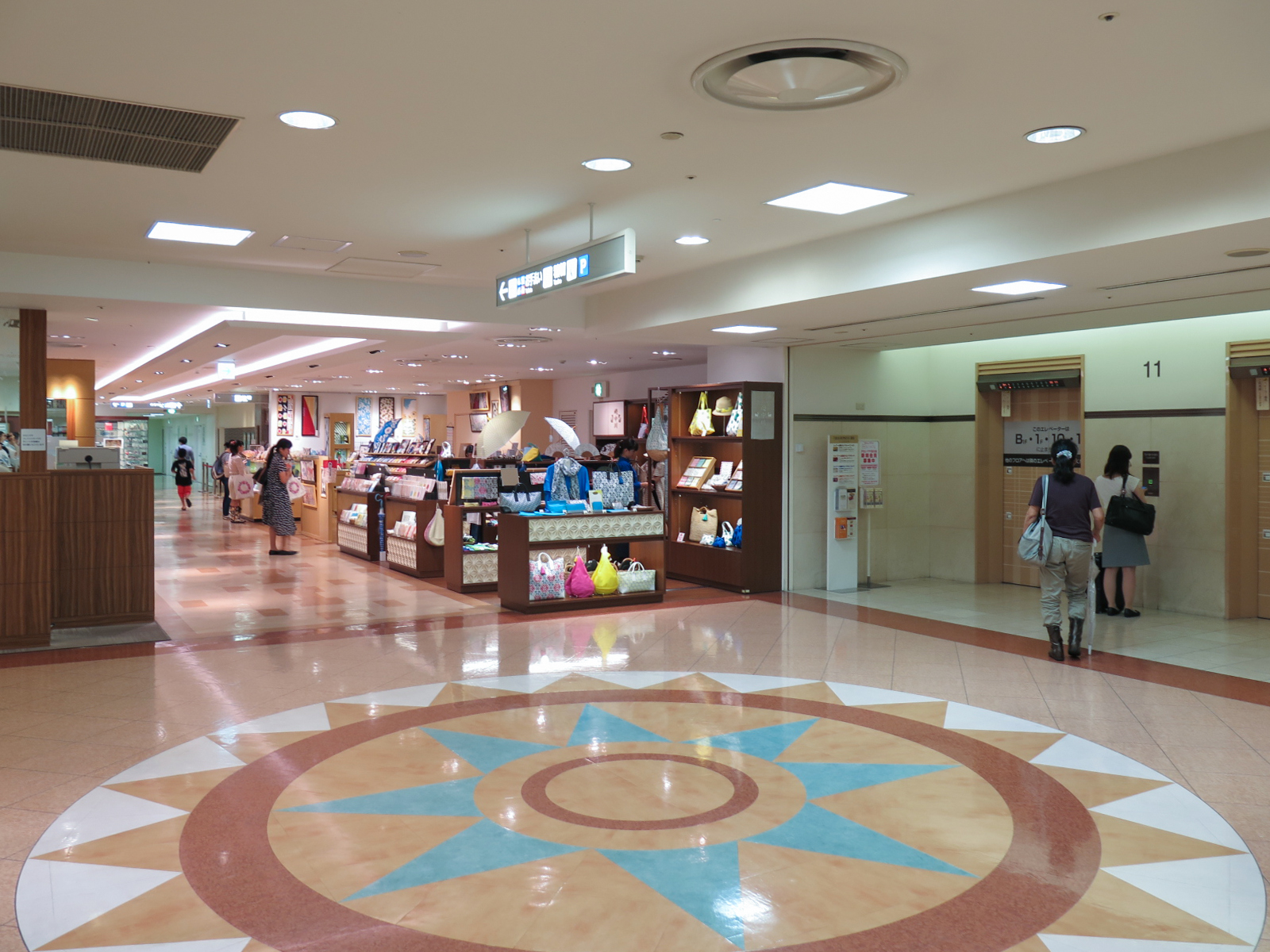
JR Nagoya Takashimaya

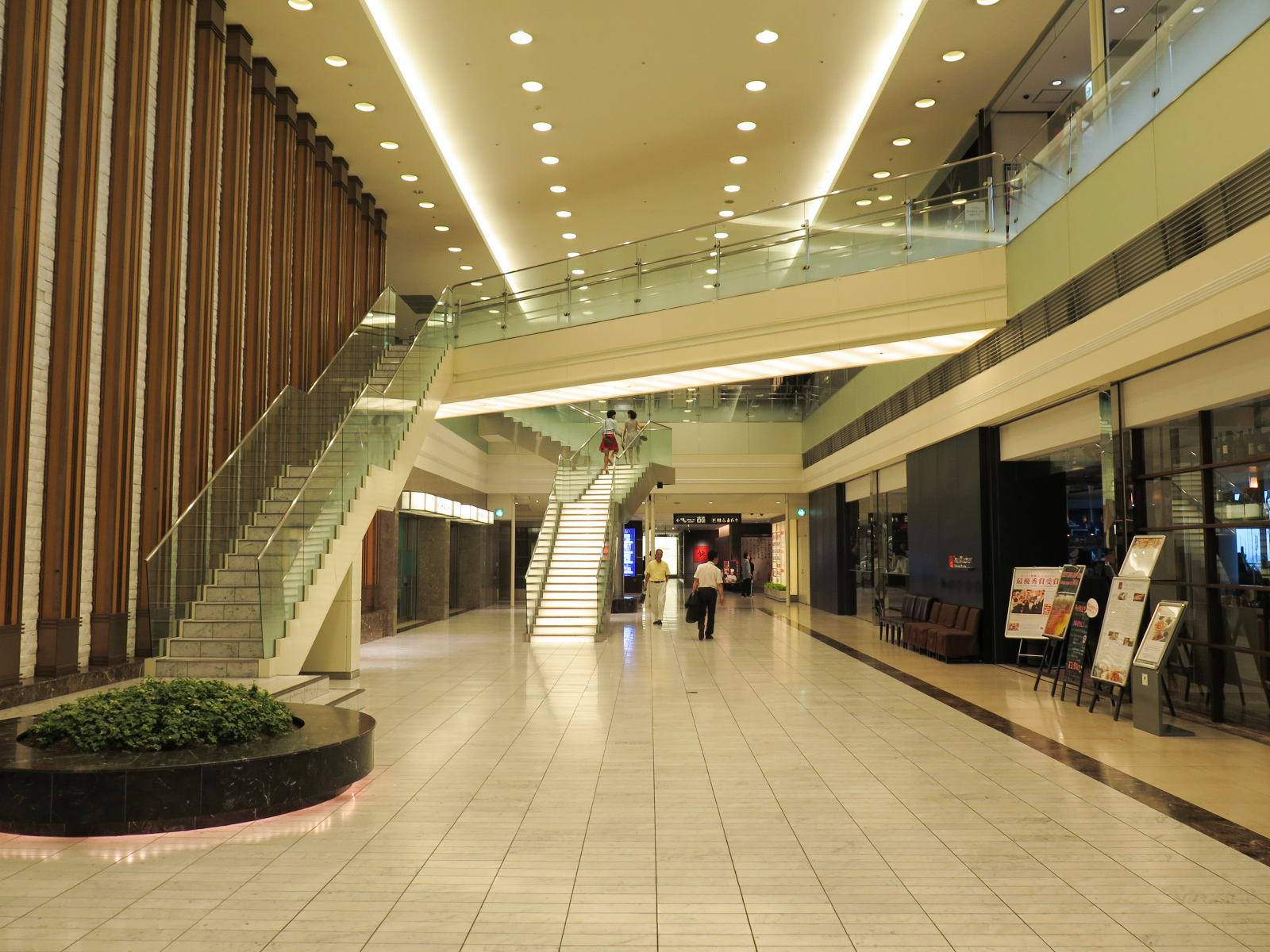
Restaurants in 12/F-13/F

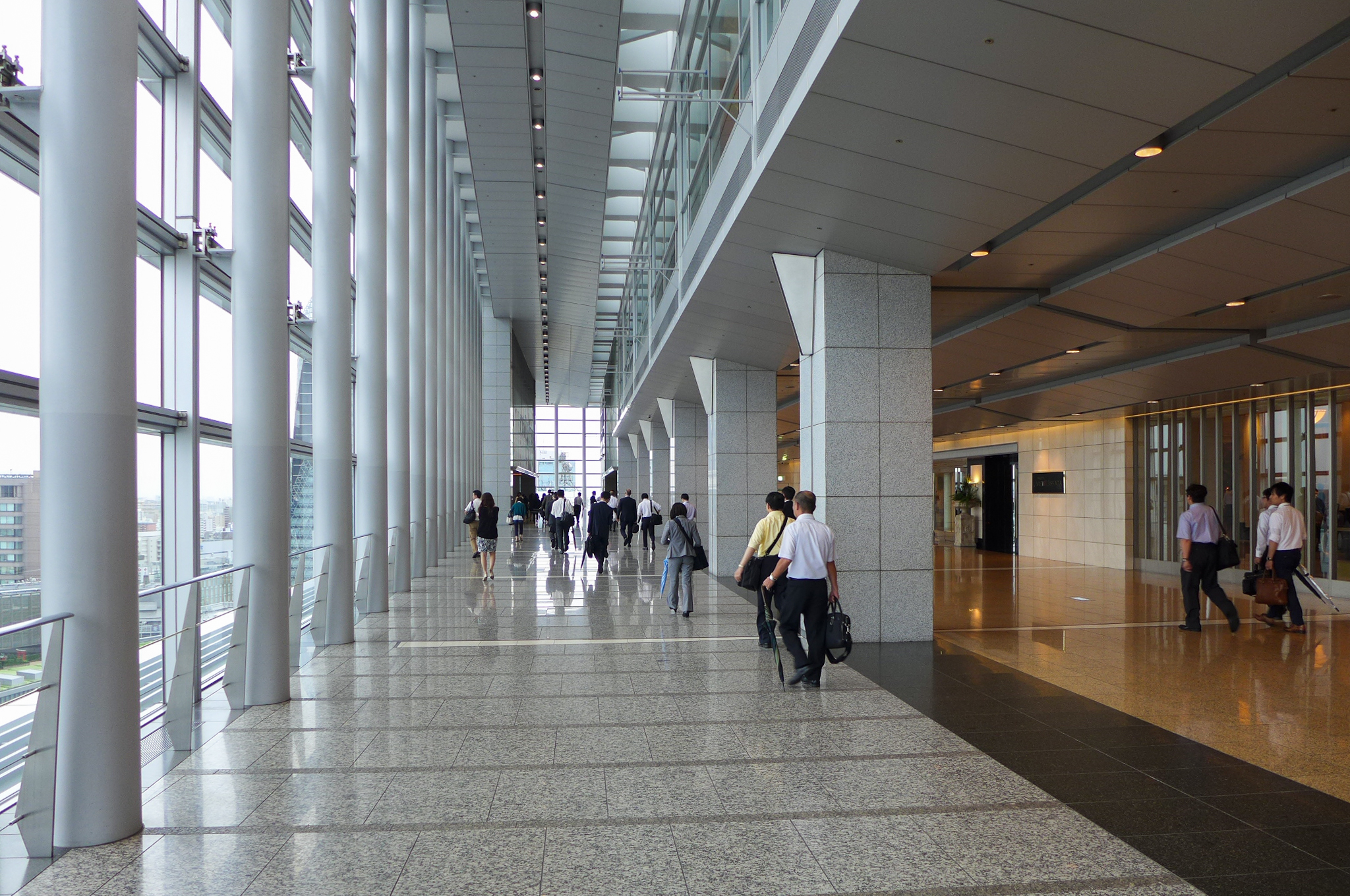
Sky Street in 15/F

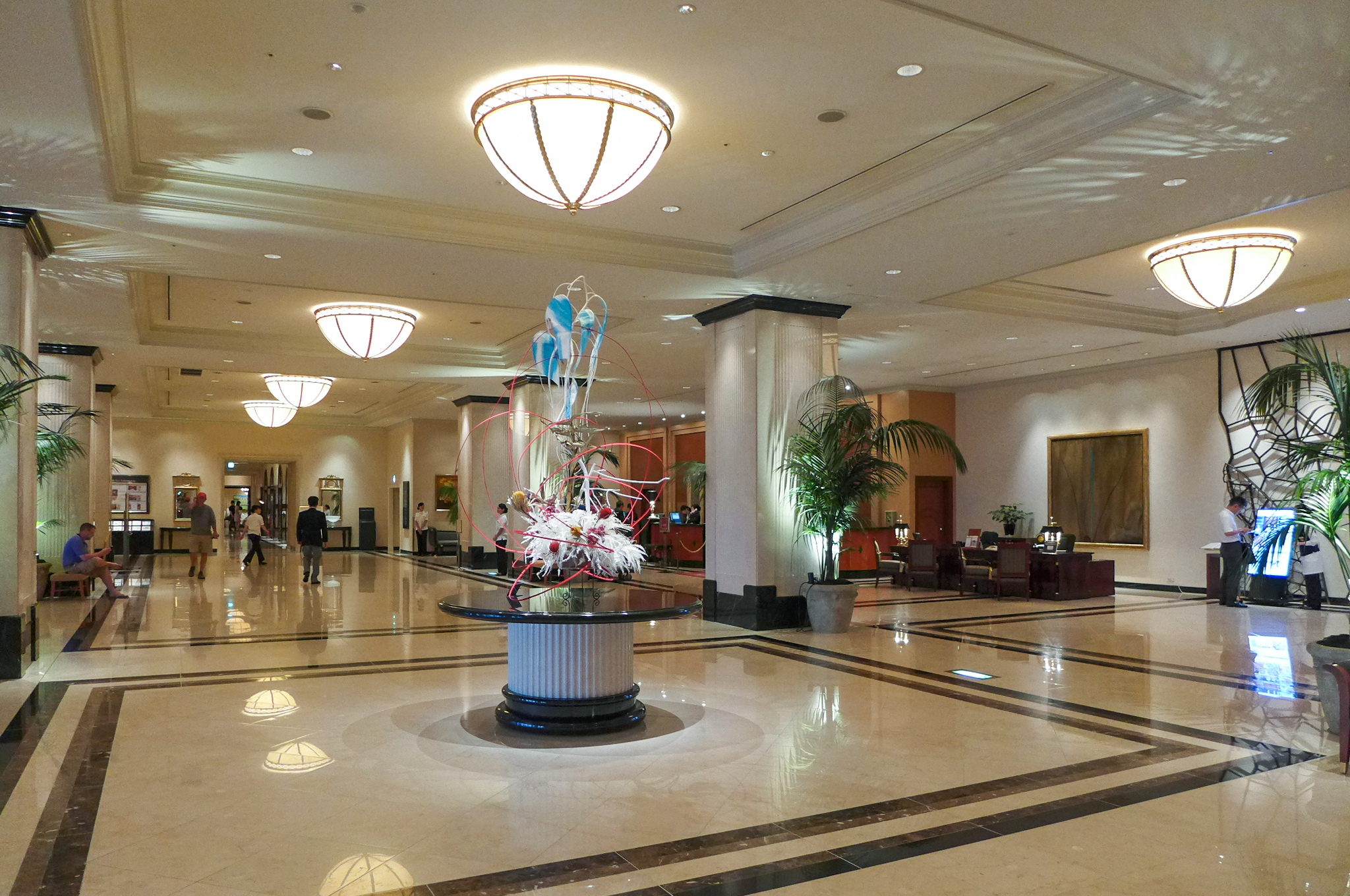
Marriott Associa Hotel Lobby

== See also ==
- List of tallest buildings in Nagoya
- List of tallest buildings in the world
