= Wenyuanbeilu station =

Metro station in Zhengzhou, China

Wenyuanbeilu 文苑北路
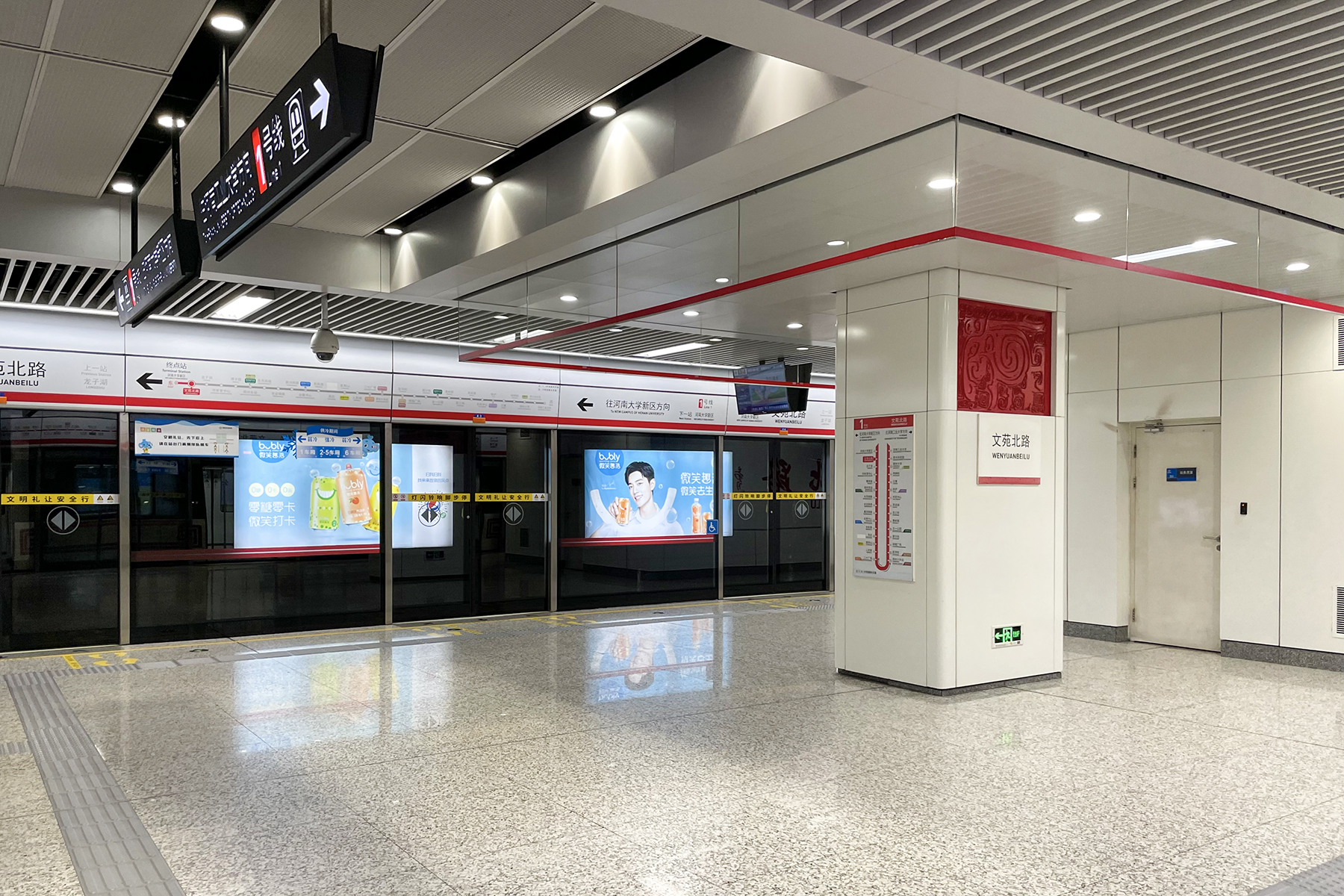

General information
- Location: Mingli Road × Wenyuan North Road; Zhengdong New Area, Zhengzhou; China
- Coordinates: 34.8098°N 113.8122°E
- System: Zhengzhou Metro rapid transit station
- Operator: Zhengzhou Metro
- Line: Line 1
- Platforms: 2 (1 island platform)
- Connections: Bus

Construction
- Structure type: Underground

Other information
- Station code: 142

History
- Opened: 12 January 2017

Services
Preceding station	Zhengzhou Metro	Following station
Longzihu towards Henan University of Technology	Line 1	New Campus of Henan University Terminus
Location
- Location within Zhengzhou

Wenyuanbeilu (Chinese: 文苑北路) is a metro station of Zhengzhou Metro Line 1.

== Station layout ==
The station has 2 floors underground. The B1 floor is for the station concourse and the B2 floor is for the platforms and tracks. The station has one island platform and two tracks for Line 1.

G	-	Exit
B1	Concourse	Customer Service, Vending machines
B2; Platforms	Platform 2	← Line 1 towards Henan University of Technology (Zhengzhou Sports Center)
B2; Platforms	Island platform, doors will open on the left
B2; Platforms	Platform 1	Line 1 towards New Campus of Henan University (Terminus) →

== Exits ==
Exit	Destination
Exit A	Mingli Road (west side)
Exit B	Mingli Road (west side), Wenyuan North Road (south side)
Exit C1	Mingli Road (east side), Wenyuan North Road (south side), Henan University of Animal Husbandry and Economy
Exit C2	Mingli Road (east side), Wenyuan North Road (north side)

== Surroundings ==
- Henan University of Animal Husbandry and Economy (河南牧业经济学院)
