= Boxuelu station =

Metro station in Zhengzhou, China

Boxuelu 博学路
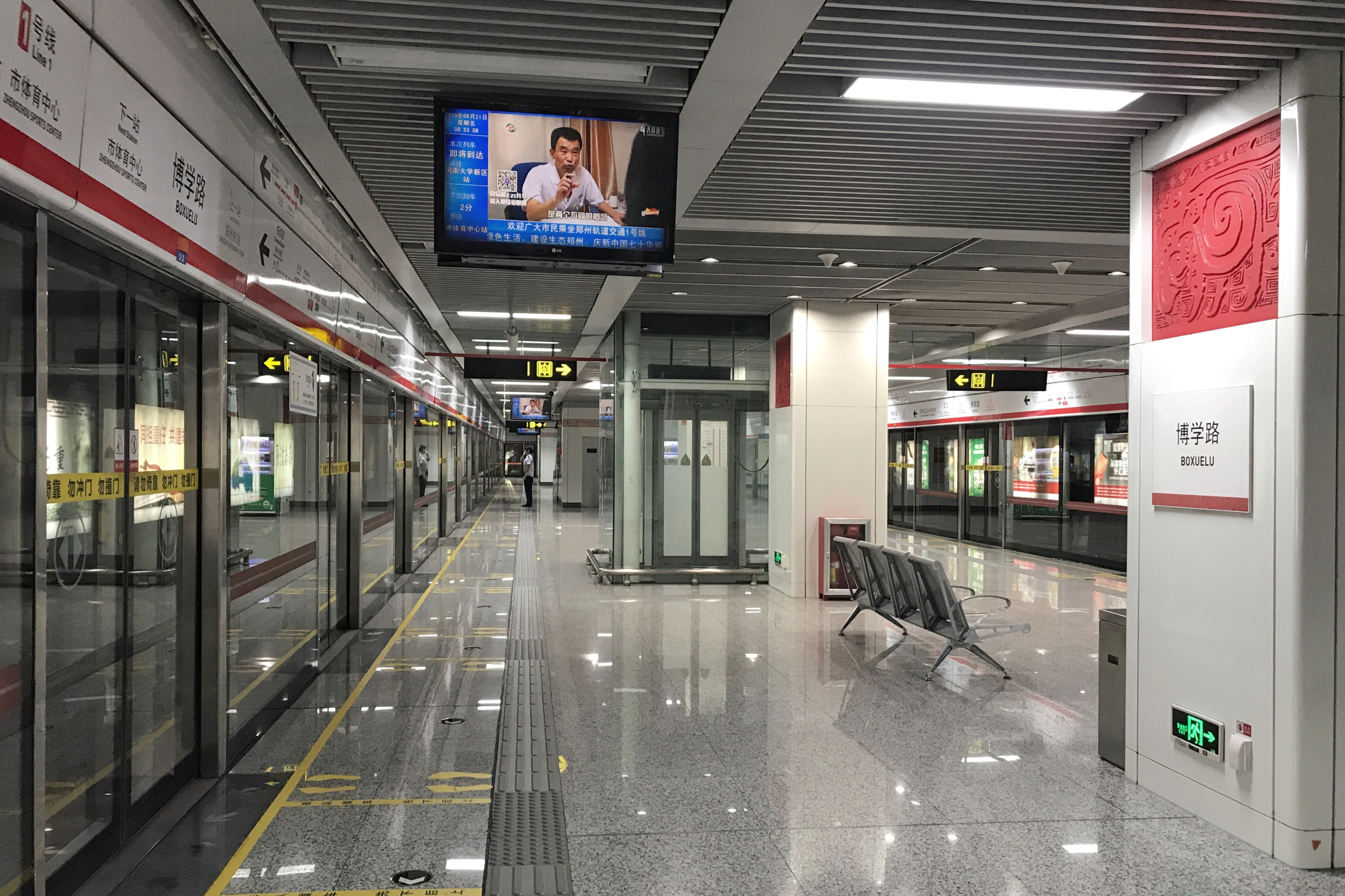

General information
- Location: Boxue Road; Zhengdong New Area, Zhengzhou; China
- Coordinates: 34.7606°N 113.7929°E
- System: Zhengzhou Metro rapid transit station
- Operator: Zhengzhou Metro
- Line: Line 1
- Platforms: 2 (1 island platform)

Construction
- Structure type: Underground

Other information
- Station code: 139

History
- Opened: 28 December 2013

Services
Preceding station	Zhengzhou Metro	Following station
Zhengzhoudong Railway Station towards Henan University of Technology	Line 1	Zhengzhou Sports Center towards New Campus of Henan University
Location
- Location within Zhengzhou

Boxuelu (Chinese: 博学路) is a metro station of Zhengzhou Metro Line 1.

The surrounding area of this station is still under construction, so the current usage of this station is very few.

== Station layout ==
The station has 2 floors underground. The B1 floor is for the station concourse and the B2 floor is for the platforms and tracks. The station has one island platform and two tracks for Line 1.

G	-	Exit
B1	Concourse	Customer Service, Vending machines
B2; Platforms	Platform 2	← Line 1 towards Henan University of Technology (Zhengzhou East Railway Station)
B2; Platforms	Island platform, doors will open on the left
B2; Platforms	Platform 1	Line 1 towards New Campus of Henan University (Zhengzhou Sports Center) →

== Exits ==
Exit	Destination
Exit A	Boxue Road, Jiayuan East Road (in planning), Dongli North Road (in planning)
Exit B	Boxue Road, Jiayuan East Road (in planning), Dongli North Road (in planning)
Exit C	Jiayuan East Road (in planning), Dongli North Road (in planning)
Exit D	Jiayuan East Road (in planning), Dongli North Road (in planning)
