= Longzihu station =

Metro station in Zhengzhou, China

Longzihu 龙子湖
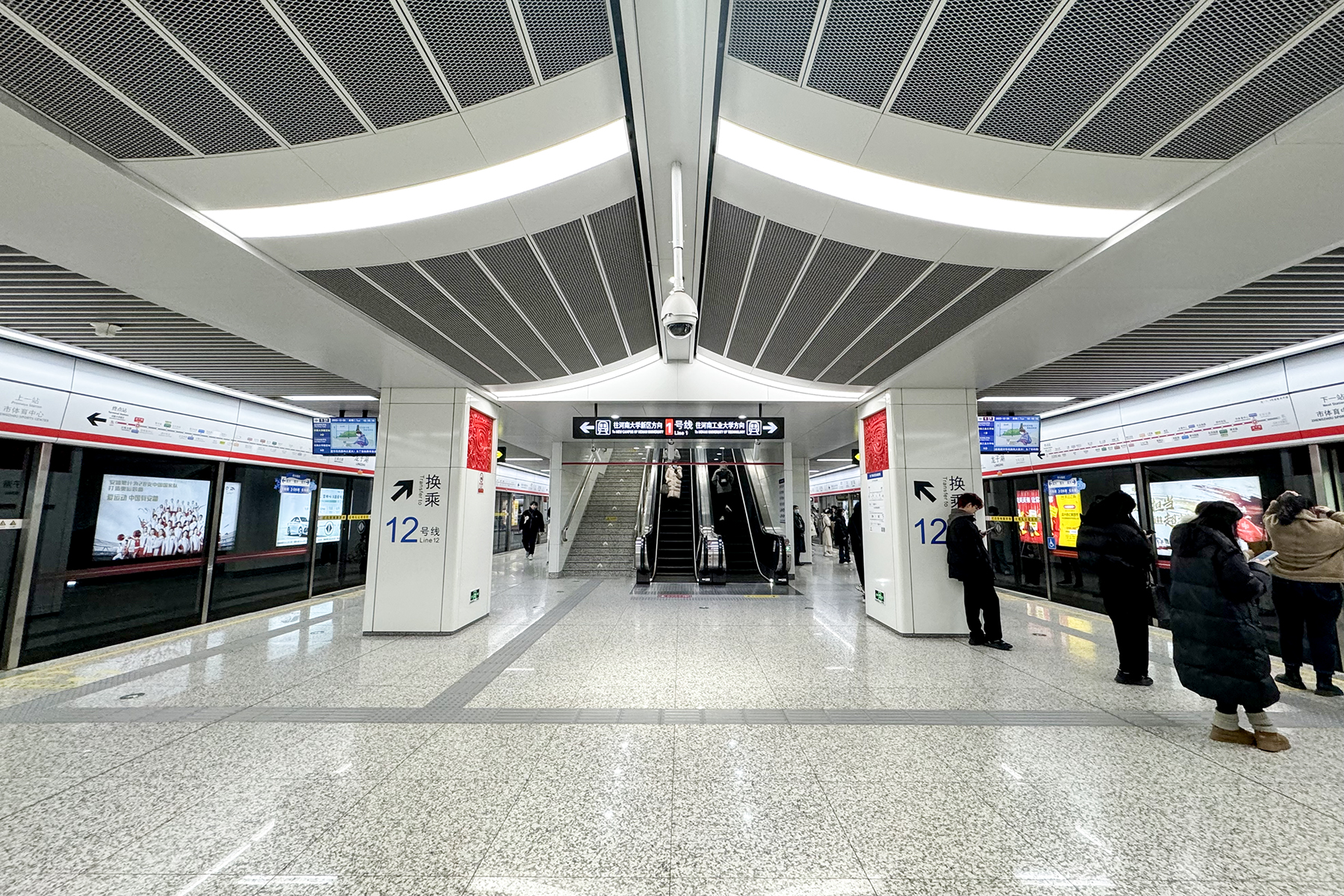
- Platforms of Line 1

General information
- Location: Mingli Road × Ping'an Avenue; Zhengdong New Area, Zhengzhou; China
- Coordinates: 34.7937°N 113.8044°E
- System: Zhengzhou Metro rapid transit station
- Operator: Zhengzhou Metro
- Lines: Line 1; Line 12
- Platforms: 2 (1 island platform)
- Connections: Bus

Construction
- Structure type: Underground

Other information
- Station code: 141

History
- Opened: 12 January 2017 (Line 1); 20 December 2023 (Line 12)

Services
Preceding station	Zhengzhou Metro	Following station
Zhengzhou Sports Center towards Henan University of Technology	Line 1	Wenyuanbeilu towards New Campus of Henan University
Longzihu Xi towards Lianghu	Line 12	Longzihu Dong Terminus
Location
- Location within Zhengzhou

Longzihu (Chinese: 龙子湖) is a metro station of Zhengzhou Metro Line 1 and Line 12. The station is located beneath the crossing of Mingli Road and Ping'an Avenue, on the center island of Longzi Lake.

== Station layout ==
The station has 2 floors underground. The B1 floor is for the station concourse and the B2 floor is for the platforms and tracks. The station has one island platform and two tracks for Line 1.

G	-	Exit
B1	Concourse	Customer Service, Vending machines
B2; Platforms	Platform 2	← Line 1 towards Henan University of Technology (Zhengzhou Sports Center)
B2; Platforms	Island platform, doors will open on the left
B2; Platforms	Platform 1	Line 1 towards New Campus of Henan University (Wenyuanbeilu) →

== Exits ==
Exit	Destination
Exit A	Mingli Road (east side), Henan Police College
Exit B	Mingli Road (west side)
Exit C	Mingli Road (west side)
Exit D	Mingli Road (east side), Henan Police College

== Surroundings ==
- Henan Police College (河南警察学院)
- Henan Agricultural University Longzihu campus (河南农业大学龙子湖校区)
