= Xiliuhu station =

Metro station in Zhengzhou, China

Xiliuhu 西流湖
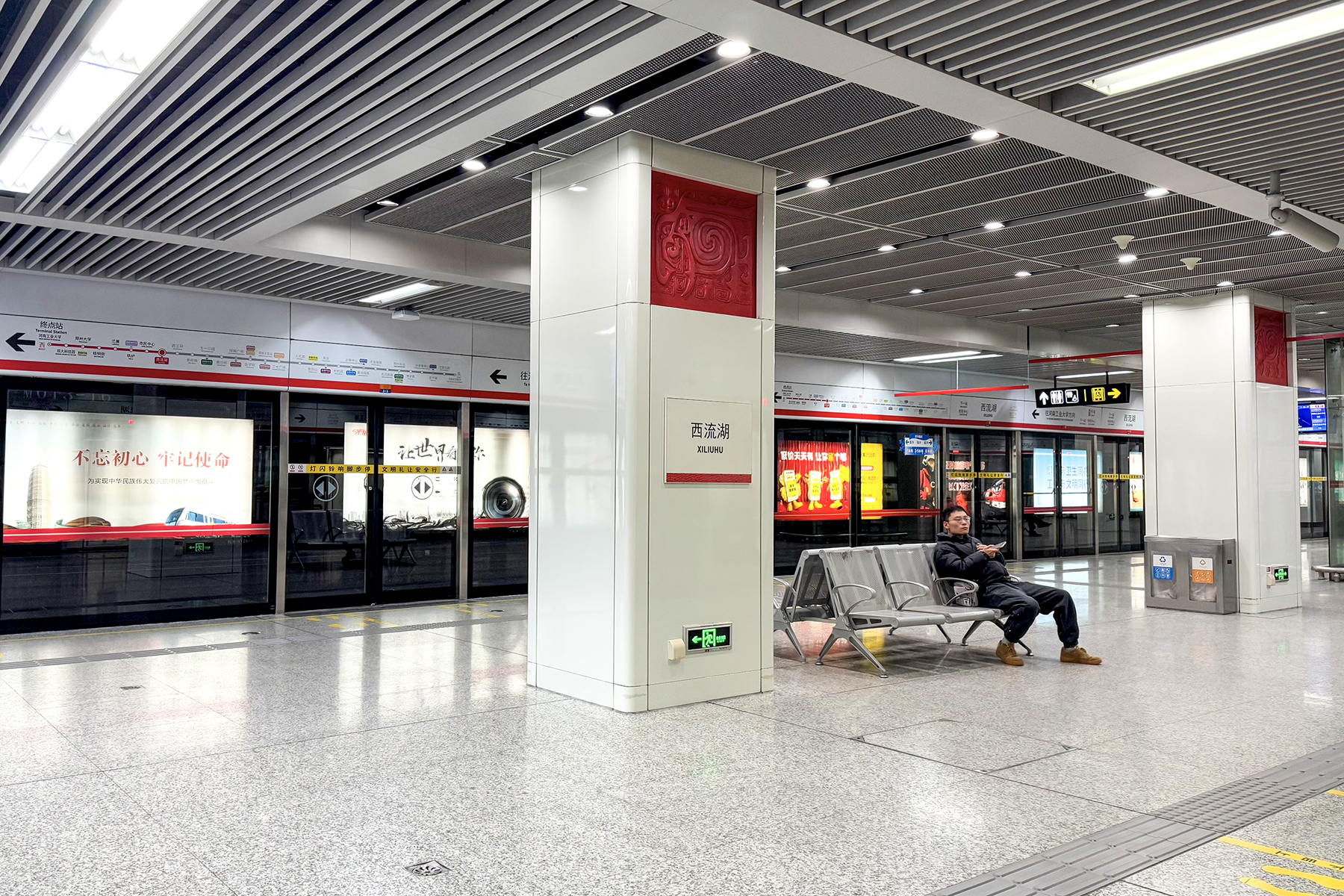

General information
- Location: Jianshe West Road × Kaixuan Road; Zhongyuan District, Zhengzhou; China
- Coordinates: 34.7624°N 113.5642°E
- System: Zhengzhou Metro rapid transit station
- Operator: Zhengzhou Metro
- Line: Line 1
- Platforms: 2 (1 island platform)
- Connections: Bus

Construction
- Structure type: Underground

Other information
- Station code: 121

History
- Opened: 28 December 2013

Services
Preceding station	Zhengzhou Metro	Following station
Civic Center towards Henan University of Technology	Line 1	Xisanhuan towards New Campus of Henan University
Location
- Location within Zhengzhou

Xiliuhu (Chinese: 西流湖; pinyin: Xīliú Hú; lit. 'Xiliu Lake') is a metro station of Zhengzhou Metro Line 1.

The station was the western terminus of Line 1 before the opening of phase II project of Line 1 in January 2017.

== Station layout ==
The station has 2 floors underground. The B1 floor is for the station concourse and the B2 floor is for the platforms and tracks. The station has one island platform and two tracks for Line 1. Some trains during peak hours still terminate at this station.

G	-	Exit
B1	Concourse	Customer Service, Vending machines
B2; Platforms	Platform 2	← Line 1 towards Henan University of Technology (Civic Center) ← Line 1 termination platform
B2; Platforms	Island platform, doors will open on the left
B2; Platforms	Platform 1	Line 1 towards New Campus of Henan University (Xisanhuan) →

Platform 2 serves as the terminus for some interval trains during rush hours in weekdays.

== Exits ==
Exit	Destination
Exit A	Jianshe West Road (north side)
Exit B	Jianshe West Road (south side), Kaixuan Road (east side)
Exit C	Jianshe West Road (south side), Kaixuan Road (west side)
Exit D	Jianshe West Road (north side)

== Surroundings ==
- Xiliuhu Park
