= Bishagang station =

Metro station in Zhengzhou, China

Bishagang 碧沙岗
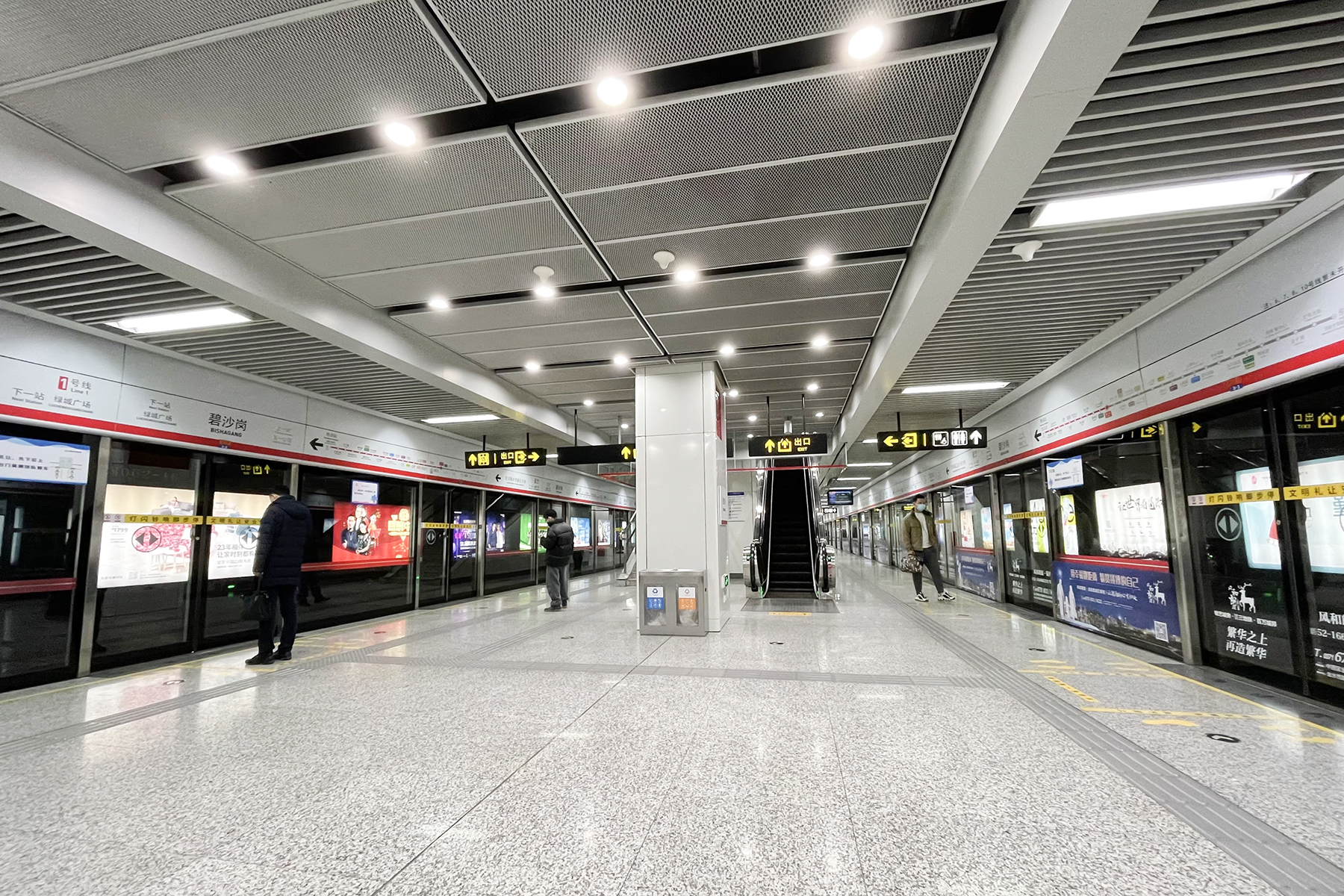

General information
- Location: Jianshe Road × Baihua Road; Zhongyuan District, Zhengzhou; China
- Coordinates: 34.7562°N 113.6184°E
- System: Zhengzhou Metro rapid transit station
- Operator: Zhengzhou Metro
- Line: Line 1
- Platforms: 2 (1 island platform)
- Connections: Bus

Construction
- Structure type: Underground

Other information
- Station code: 125

History
- Opened: 28 December 2013

Services
Preceding station	Zhengzhou Metro	Following station
Wuyigongyuan towards Henan University of Technology	Line 1	Lucheng Guangchang towards New Campus of Henan University
Location
- Location within Zhengzhou

Bishagang (Chinese: 碧沙岗) is a metro station of Zhengzhou Metro Line 1.

The station lies beneath the crossing of Jianshe Road and Baihua Road, about 500m west of the Bishagang Park.

== Station layout ==
The station has 2 floors underground. The B1 floor is for the station concourse and the B2 floor is for the platforms and tracks. The station has one island platform and two tracks for Line 1.

G	-	Exit
B1	Concourse	Customer Service, Vending machines
B2; Platforms	Platform 2	← Line 1 towards Henan University of Technology (Wuyigongyuan)
B2; Platforms	Island platform, doors will open on the left
B2; Platforms	Platform 1	Line 1 towards New Campus of Henan University (Lucheng Guangchang) →

== Exits ==
Exit	Destination
Exit A	Jianshe Road (north side), Baihua Road (east side)
Exit B	Jianshe Road (south side), Baihua Road (east side), Bishagang Park
Exit C	Jianshe Road (south side), Baihua Road (west side)
Exit D	Jianshe Road (north side), Baihua Road (west side)

== Surroundings ==
- Bishagang Park (碧沙岗公园)
- Zhongyuan Commercial City (中原商贸城)
