= Wuyigongyuan station =

Metro station in Zhengzhou, China

Wuyigongyuan 五一公园
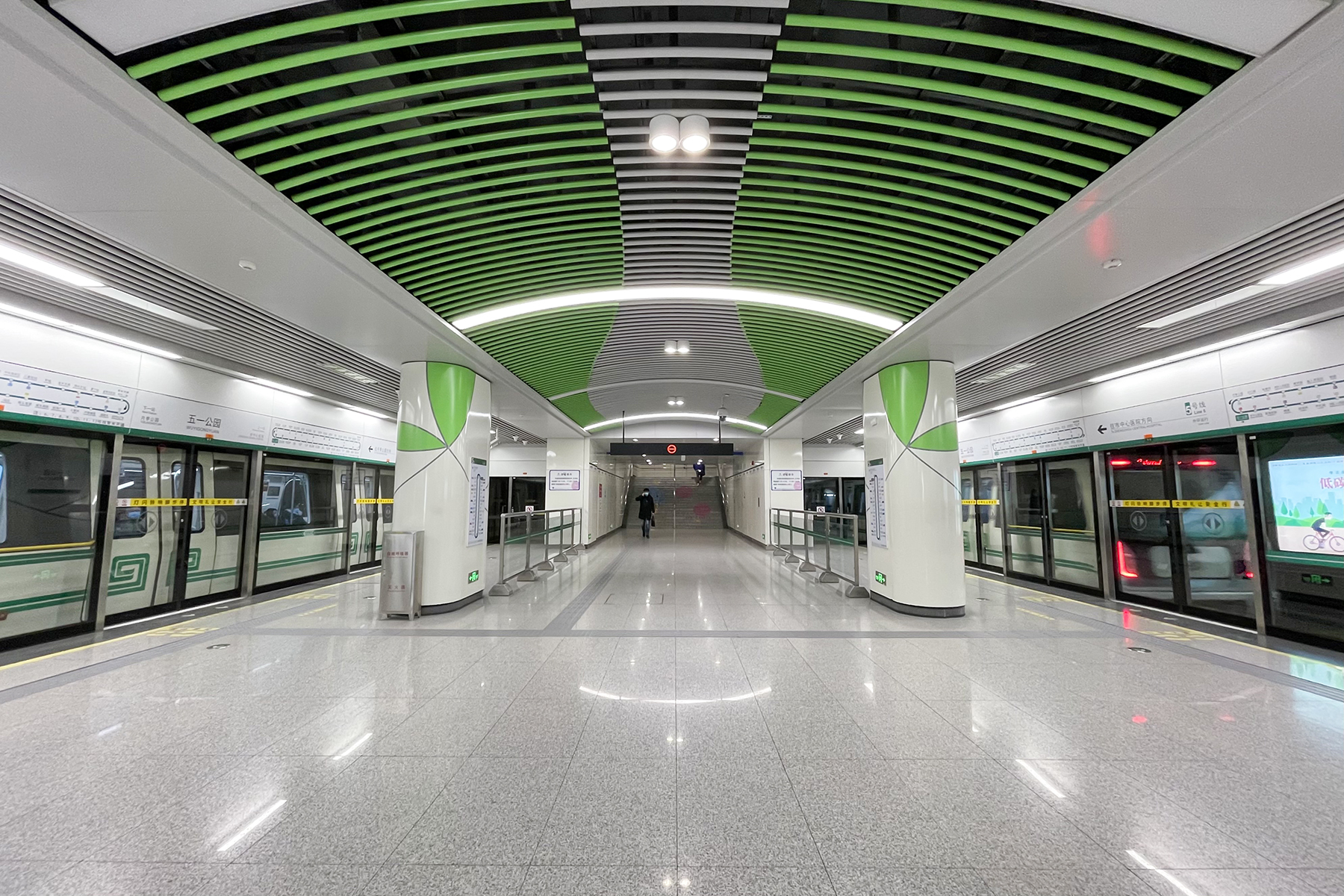
- Platforms of Line 5

General information
- Location: Jianshe Road × Tongbai Road; Zhongyuan District, Zhengzhou; China
- Coordinates: 34.7569°N 113.6080°E
- System: Zhengzhou Metro rapid transit station
- Operator: Zhengzhou Metro
- Lines: Line 1; Line 5
- Platforms: 4 (2 island platforms)
- Connections: Bus; Zhengzhou BRT

Construction
- Structure type: Underground

Other information
- Station code: 124

History
- Opened: 28 December 2013
- Former names: Tongbai Road

Services
Preceding station	Zhengzhou Metro	Following station
Qinlinglu towards Henan University of Technology	Line 1	Bishagang towards New Campus of Henan University
Yuejigongyuan inner loop	Line 5	Zhengzhou Central Hospital outer loop
Location
- Location within Zhengzhou

Wuyigongyuan (Chinese: 五一公园, literally "Wuyi Park" or "May 1 Park") is a metro station of Zhengzhou Metro. The station lies beneath the crossing of Jianshe Road and Tongbai Road and is the interchange station between Line 1 and Line 5.

The station was first opened as Tongbai Road, after the road. It was later changed to the current name before the opening of Line 5, possibly to avoid confusions after the operations of Line 5, which runs beneath Tongbai Road for a long distance and have several stations on the road, started.

== Station layout ==
The station has 3 levels underground. The B1 level is for the station concourse, the B2 level is for the platforms and tracks of Line 1 and the B3 level is for Line 5.

G	-	Exit
B1	Concourse	Customer Service, Vending machines
B2; Platforms	Platform 2	← Line 1 towards Henan University of Technology (Qinlinglu)
B2; Platforms	Island platform, doors will open on the left
B2; Platforms	Platform 1	Line 1 towards New Campus of Henan University (Bishagang) →
B3; Platforms	Platform 4	← Line 5 outer loop (Zhengzhou Central Hospital)
B3; Platforms	Island platform, doors will open on the left
B3; Platforms	Platform 3	Line 5 inner loop (Yuejigongyuan) →

== Exits ==
Exit	Destination
Exit C	Jianshe Road (south side), Tongbai Road (east side)
Exit D	Jianshe Road (south side), Tongbai Road (west side)
Exit E	Jianshe Road (north side), Tongbai Road (west side)

== Surroundings ==
- Wuyi Park
- Henan Workers Culture Palace
