= Xizhou station =

Xizhou station may refer to the following stations:

- Xizhou station (Guangzhou Metro), a station on Line 12 and Line 13 of the Guangzhou Metro, China
- Xizhou station (Zhengzhou Metro), a metro station on Line 3 and Line 12 (Zhengzhou Metro), China
