= Zhengzhou Sports Center station =

Metro station in Zhengzhou, China

Zhengzhou Sports Center 市体育中心
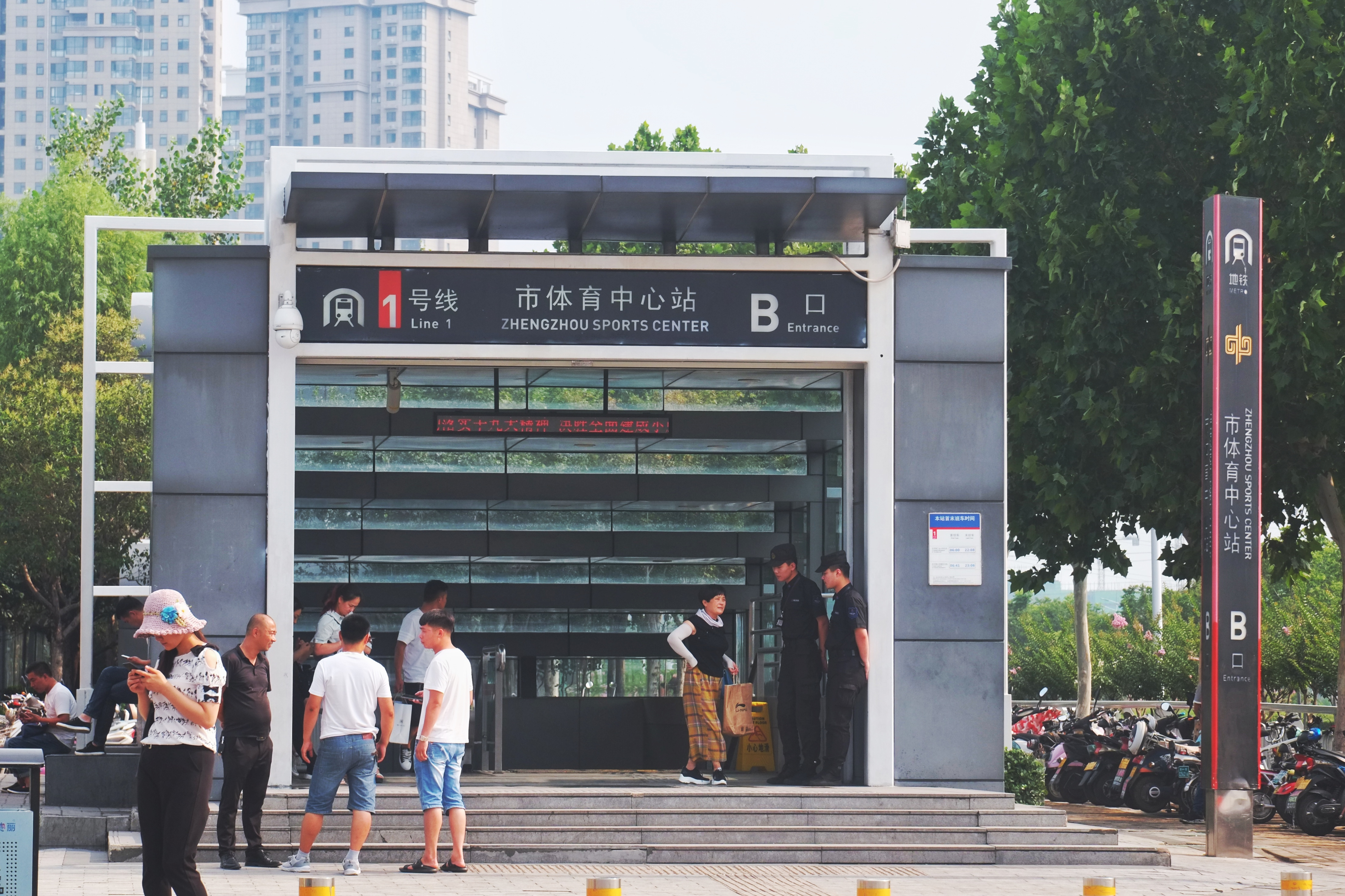

General information
- Location: Mingli Road × Xueli Road; Zhengdong New Area, Zhengzhou; China
- Coordinates: 34.7743°N 113.8043°E
- System: Zhengzhou Metro rapid transit station
- Operator: Zhengzhou Metro
- Line: Line 1
- Platforms: 2 (1 island platform)
- Connections: Bus

Construction
- Structure type: Underground

Other information
- Station code: 140

History
- Opened: 28 December 2013

Services
Preceding station	Zhengzhou Metro	Following station
Boxuelu towards Henan University of Technology	Line 1	Longzihu towards New Campus of Henan University
Location
- Location within Zhengzhou

Zhengzhou Sports Center (Chinese: 市体育中心) is a metro station of Zhengzhou Metro Line 1. The station was the western terminus of Line 1 before the opening of phase II project of Line 1 in January 2017.

Zhengzhou Sports Center was originally planned to be built in the surrounding area when the station was constructed. The plan was later changed and the sports center was built in the western area of the city instead, but the name of the station was not changed.

== Station layout ==
The station has 2 floors underground. The B1 floor is for the station concourse and the B2 floor is for the platforms and tracks. The station has one island platform and two tracks for Line 1.

G	-	Exit
B1	Concourse	Customer Service, Vending machines
B2; Platforms	Platform 2	← Line 1 towards Henan University of Technology (Boxuelu)
B2; Platforms	Island platform, doors will open on the left
B2; Platforms	Platform 1	Line 1 towards New Campus of Henan University (Longzihu) → Line 1 termination platform →

Some trains use Platform 1 as the terminus during rush hours in weekdays.

== Exits ==
Exit	Destination
Exit B	Mingli Road (east side), Jinshui East Road, Zhongyuan Tennis Center
Exit C	Mingli Road (east side), The People's Procuratorate of Zhengzhou
Exit E	Mingli Road (west side), Xueli Road (south side), HUTCM

== Surroundings ==
- Zhongyuan Tennis Center (中原网球中心)
- The People's Procuratorate of Zhengzhou (郑州市人民检察院)
- Henan University of Traditional Chinese Medicine (河南中医药大学)
