= Line 1 (Zhengzhou Metro) =

Metro line in Zhengzhou, China

- 1
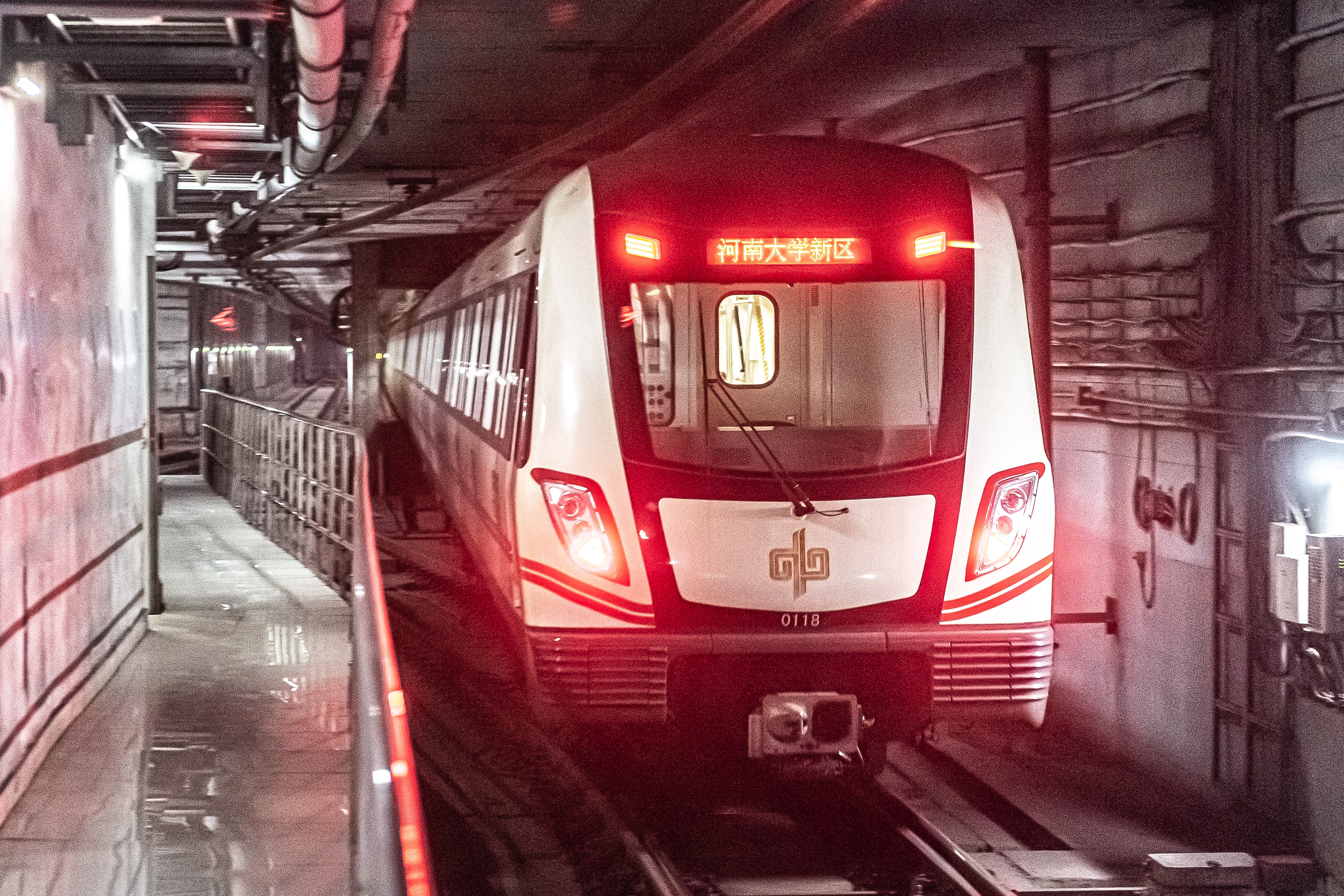
- A train of Line 1 leaving Minhanglu station

Overview
- Status: Operational
- Owner: Zhengzhou
- Locale: Zhengzhou, Henan, China
- Termini: Henan University of Technology; New Campus of Henan University
- Stations: 30

Service
- Type: Rapid transit
- System: Zhengzhou Metro
- Operator(s): Zhengzhou Metro Group Corporation
- Depot(s): Zhengdong Depot; Kaixuan Road Stabling Yard

History
- Opened: December 28, 2013; 11 years ago

Technical
- Line length: 41.2 km (25.60 mi)
- Number of tracks: 2
- Character: Underground
- Track gauge: 1,435 mm (4 ft 8 1/2 in)
- Electrification: Overhead lines (1500 volts)

Line 1 of the Zhengzhou Metro (Chinese: 郑州地铁一号线; pinyin: Zhèngzhōu Dìtiě Yī Hào Xiàn) is a rapid transit line running from west to east Zhengzhou. It opened on the 28 December 2013. This line is currently 41.2 km long with 30 stations.

== Opening timeline ==
Phase 1 of Line 1 opened on 28 December 2013. Phase 1 of Line 1 is 26.2 km (16.28 mi) in length.

Phase 2 of Line 1 opened on 12 January 2017 extending terminals on both ends with additional seven stations (9.65 km) on the western end and two stations (5.36 km) on the eastern end.

Segment	Commencement	Length	Station(s)	Name
Xiliuhu — Zhengzhou Sports Center	28 December 2013	26.2 km (16.28 mi)	20	Phase 1
Henan University of Technology — Xiliuhu	12 January 2017	9.65 km (6.00 mi)	7	Phase 2
Zhengzhou Sports Center — Wenyuanbeilu	12 January 2017	5.36 km (3.33 mi)	2	Phase 2
Wenyuanbeilu — New Campus of Henan University	21 November 2019	5.36 km (3.33 mi)	1	Phase 2

== Stations ==
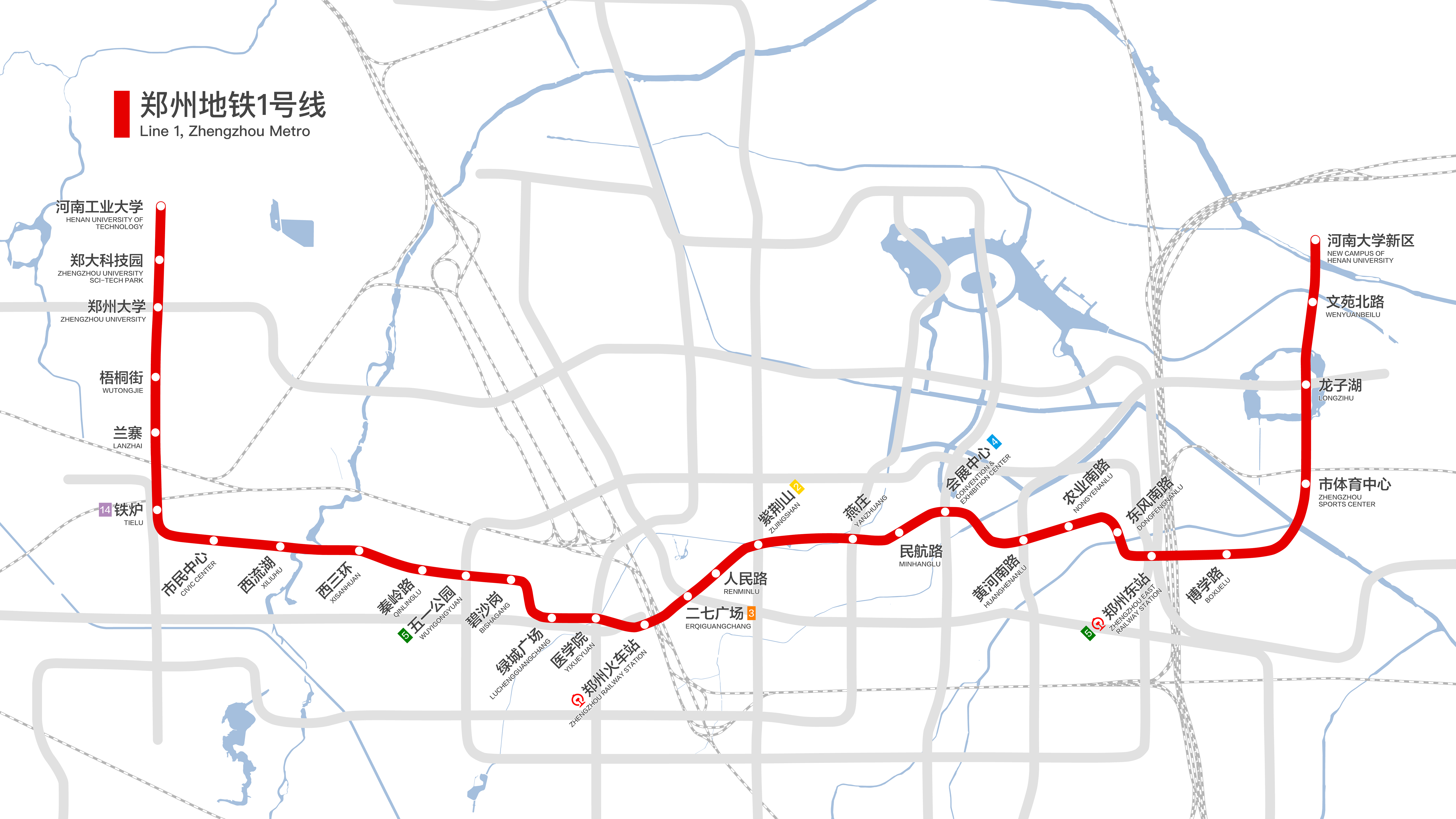
Map of Zhengzhou Metro Line 1

Service routes		Station №	Station name		Connections	Distance km	Location
Service routes		Station №	English	Chinese	Connections	Distance km	Location
●		0114	Henan University of Technology	河南工业大学	Zhengzhou BRT Route B2		Zhongyuan
●		0115	Zhengzhou University Sci-Tech Park	郑大科技园			Zhongyuan
●		0116	Zhengzhou University	郑州大学	8		Zhongyuan
●		0117	Wutongjie	梧桐街			Zhongyuan
●		0118	Lanzhai	兰寨			Zhongyuan
●		0119	Tielu	铁炉	14		Zhongyuan
●		0120	Civic Center	市民中心			Zhongyuan
●	●	0121	Xiliuhu	西流湖			Zhongyuan
●	●	0122	Xisanhuan	西三环			Zhongyuan
●	●	0123	Qinlinglu	秦岭路	Zhengzhou BRT Route B1		Zhongyuan
●	●	0124	Wuyigongyuan	五一公园	5		Zhongyuan
●	●	0125	Bishagang	碧沙岗			Zhongyuan
●	●	0126	Lüchengguangchang	绿城广场	10		Erqi
●	●	0127	Yixueyuan	医学院	7 10		Erqi
●	●	0128	Zhengzhou Railway Station	郑州火车站	ZJ ZZF; 10		Erqi
●	●	0129	Erqiguangchang	二七广场	3		Erqi
●	●	0130	Renminlu	人民路			Erqi
●	●	0131	Zijingshan	紫荆山	2		Jinshui
●	●	0132	Yanzhuang	燕庄	6		Jinshui
●	●	0133	Minhanglu	民航路			Jinshui
●	●	0134	Convention and Exhibition Center	会展中心	4		Jinshui
●	●	0135	Huanghenanlu	黄河南路	12		Jinshui
●	●	0136	Nongyenanlu	农业南路			Jinshui
●	●	0137	Dongfengnanlu	东风南路			Jinshui
●	●	0138	Zhengzhoudong Railway Station	郑州东站	ZK ZXA ZAF; 5 8 Zhengzhou BRT Route B5, B6, B7		Jinshui
●	●	0139	Boxuelu	博学路			Jinshui
●	●	0140	Zhengzhou Sports Center	市体育中心			Jinshui
●		0141	Longzihu	龙子湖	12		Jinshui
●		0142	Wenyuanbeilu	文苑北路			Jinshui
●		0143	New Campus of Henan University	河南大学新区			Jinshui
