= Line 12 (Zhengzhou Metro) =

Metro line in Zhengzhou, China

- 12
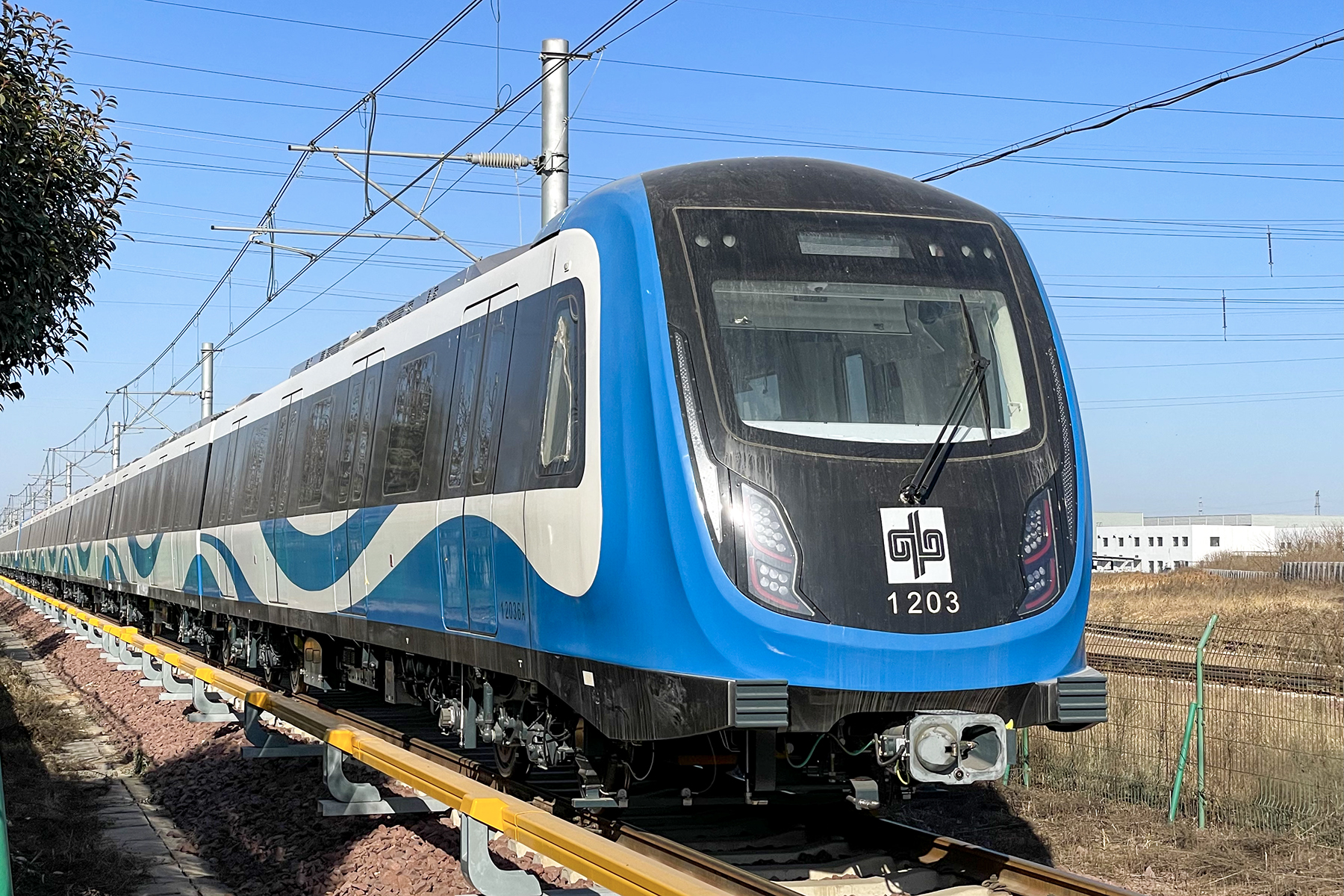
- A train of Zhengzhou Metro Line 12

Overview
- Status: Operational
- Locale: Zhengzhou, Henan Province, China
- Termini: Longzihu Dong; Lianghu

Service
- Type: Rapid transit
- System: Zhengzhou Metro

History
- Opened: 20 December 2023; 15 months ago

Technical
- Line length: 16.538 km (10.276 mi)
- Number of tracks: 2
- Character: Underground
- Track gauge: 1,435 mm (4 ft 8 1/2 in)

Line 12 of the Zhengzhou Metro (Chinese: 郑州地铁12号线) is a rapid transit line in Zhengzhou, Henan Province, China. Phase 1 of Line 12 is 16.538 km (10.276 mi) long with 11 stations.

== Stations (Southwest to Northeast) ==
Station No.	Station name		Connections	Location
Station No.	English	Chinese	Connections	Location
1221	Lianghu	梁湖		Guancheng
1223	Futa Dong	福塔东	5	Guancheng
1225	Jingbeiwu Lu	经北五路		Guancheng
1227	Xizhou	西周	3	Guancheng
1229	Huanghenanlu	黄河南路	1	Jinshui
1231	Children's Hospital	儿童医院	5	Jinshui
1233	Dongfengdong Lu	东风东路		Jinshui
1235	Gaotie Gongyuan	高铁公园	8	Jinshui
1237	Longzihu Xi	龙子湖西		Jinshui
1239	Longzihu	龙子湖	1	Jinshui
1241	Longzihu Dong	龙子湖东		Jinshui

== History ==
Phase 1 of Line 12 was approved by NDRC on 29 March 2019. The line opened on 20 December 2023.
