= Henan University of Animal Husbandry and Economy =

University in Zhengzhou, China

- 河南牧业经济学院
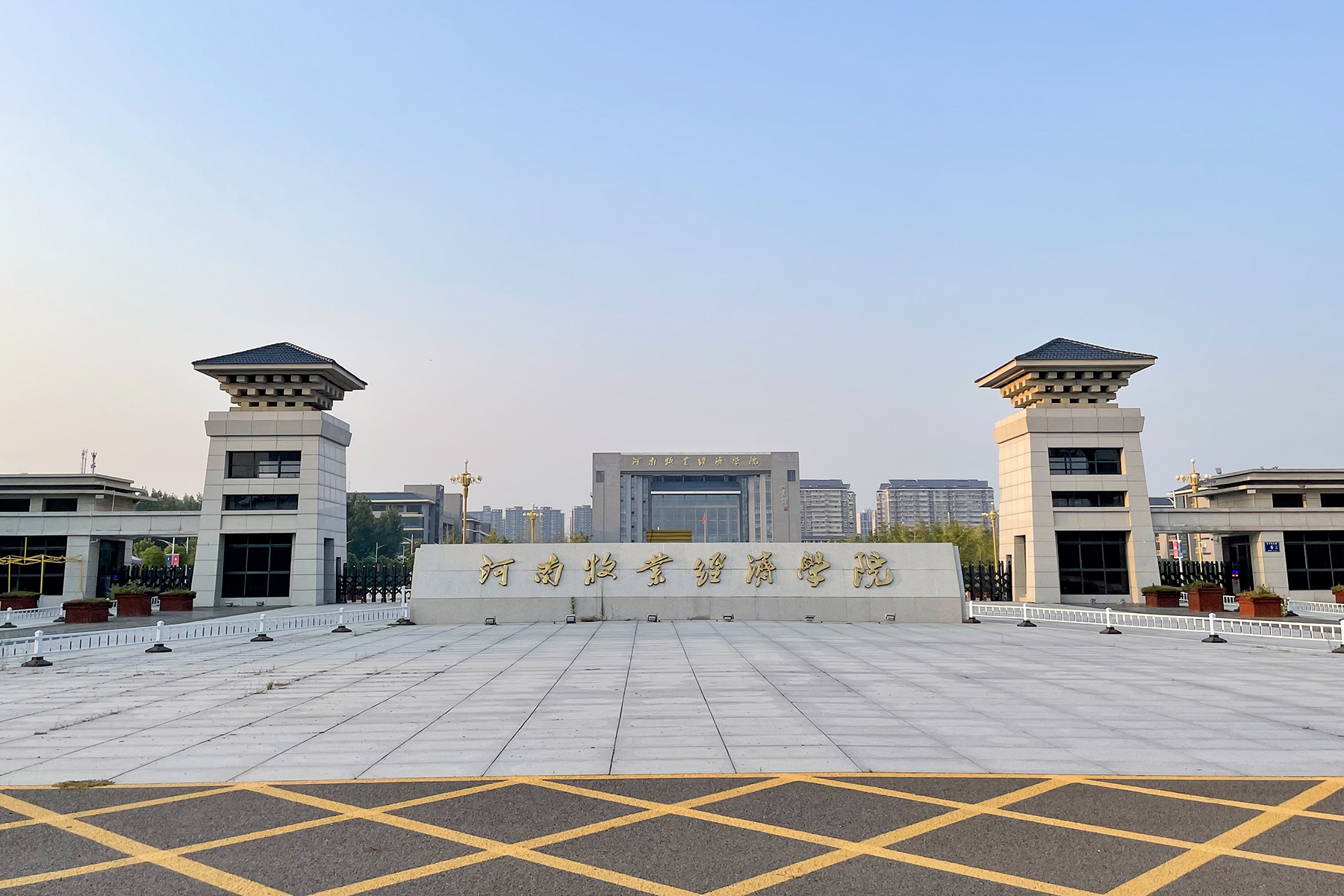
- Longzi Lake campus gate
- Type: Public
- Established: 1960
- Affiliations: Henan Provincial Education Department
- President: Luo Shixi (罗士喜)
- Party secretary: Mu Ruijie (穆瑞杰)
- Academic staff: 1492
- Students: 30,000
- Location: 6 Longzi Lake North Road, Zhengdong New Area, Zhengzhou (Longzi Lake campus); 2 Yingcai Street, Huiji District, Zhengzhou (Yingcai Campus)
- Campus: 141 hectares; Urban
- Website: http://www.hnuahe.edu.cn/

Henan University of Animal Husbandry and Economy (Chinese: 河南牧业经济学院; pinyin: Hénán Mùyè Jīngjì Xuéyuàn) is an undergraduate college in Zhengzhou, Henan, which was established in 2013 from the merger of Zhengzhou College of Animal Husbandry Engineering and Henan Business College. It occupies an area of 141 hectares and has more than 30,000 full-time in-person students. It has 1492 full-time instructors, including 1040 with postgraduate training.

The college includes more than 20 departments, including animal science and technology, veterinary medicine, food engineering, business administration, and accounting. Available specializations include agronomy, engineering, management, economics, science, literature, law, and art.

According to the school's official website in April 2023, the school covers a total area of 1.913 million square meters, and there are three campuses and three science and education bases in Longzi Lake, Yingcai, Beilin, and a total construction area of 955,800 square meters.The total construction area is 955,800 square meters.The total value of teaching and research equipment is 257 million yuan, and the collection of paper books is 2.817 million; there are 21 secondary teaching units and 50 undergraduate majors; there are 1,880 faculty and staff.

== Departments ==
- Animal science and technology (with an attached feed engineering and technology research center)
- Veterinary medicine (with an attached center for pig disease control and prevention)
- Food engineering
- Business administration (with an attached research institute on the development of Henanese companies)
- Accounting
- Finance
- Pharmaceutical engineering
- Bioengineering
- Packaging and printing engineering
- Management of farming and forestry
- Logistics and e-commerce
- Engineering management
- Automation
- Energy and power engineering
- Economics and business
- Information technology and electronic engineering
- Software (combined with a department for public computer courses)
- Grammar (with an attached research institute on Henan business culture and a legal research institute)
- Art (with an attached research center for art, painting, and calligraphy)
- Tourism management
- Foreign languages
- International education
- Ideological and political theory
- Core curriculum
- Beilong physical education
- Yingcai physical education
- Public foreign language teaching and research
- Continuing education
- Experimental research center
