= Zhengzhou Metro =

Rapid transit network in Zhengzhou, Henan, China

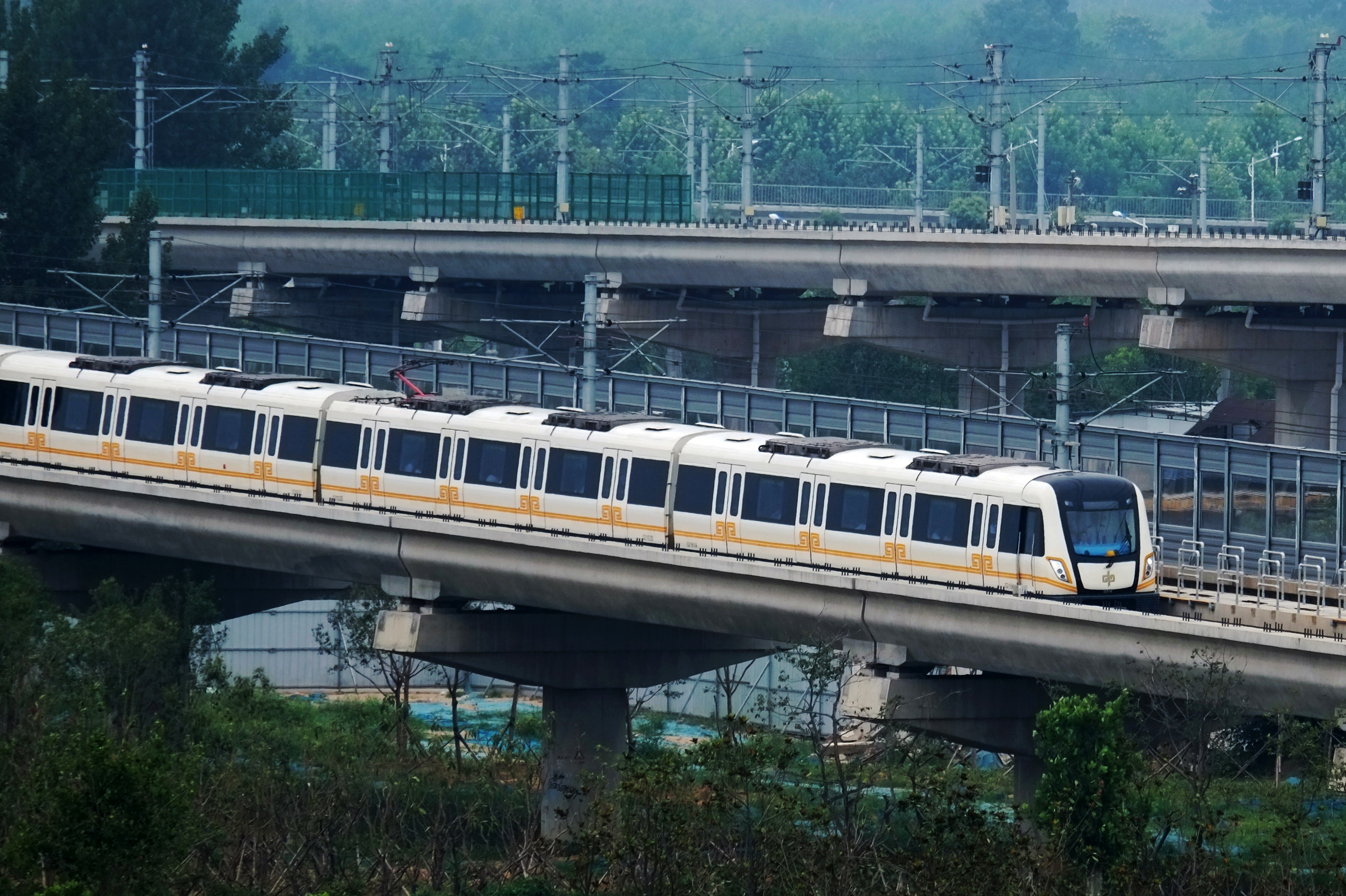
- A Chengjiao line train

Overview
- Owner: City of Zhengzhou
- Locale: Zhengzhou, Henan Province, China
- Transit type: Rapid transit
- Number of lines: 13
- Number of stations: 284
- Daily ridership: 1.1767 million (2021 average); 4,568,900 (31/12/2025 Peak)
- Website: www.zzmetro.com https://www.zzmetro.cn/

Operation
- Began operation: December 28, 2013; 12 years ago
- Operators: Zhengzhou Metro Group Co. Ltd (All, except Line 3).; Henan Zhengxu Rail Transit Co., Ltd (Zhengxu Line only).; Zhengzhou China Construction Shenzhen Railway Rail Transit Co., Ltd. (Line 3 only).

Technical
- System length: 450 km (279.6 mi)
- Track gauge: 1,435 mm (4 ft 8 1/2 in) (standard gauge)
- Electrification: DC 1500 V overhead line
System map
Physical layout
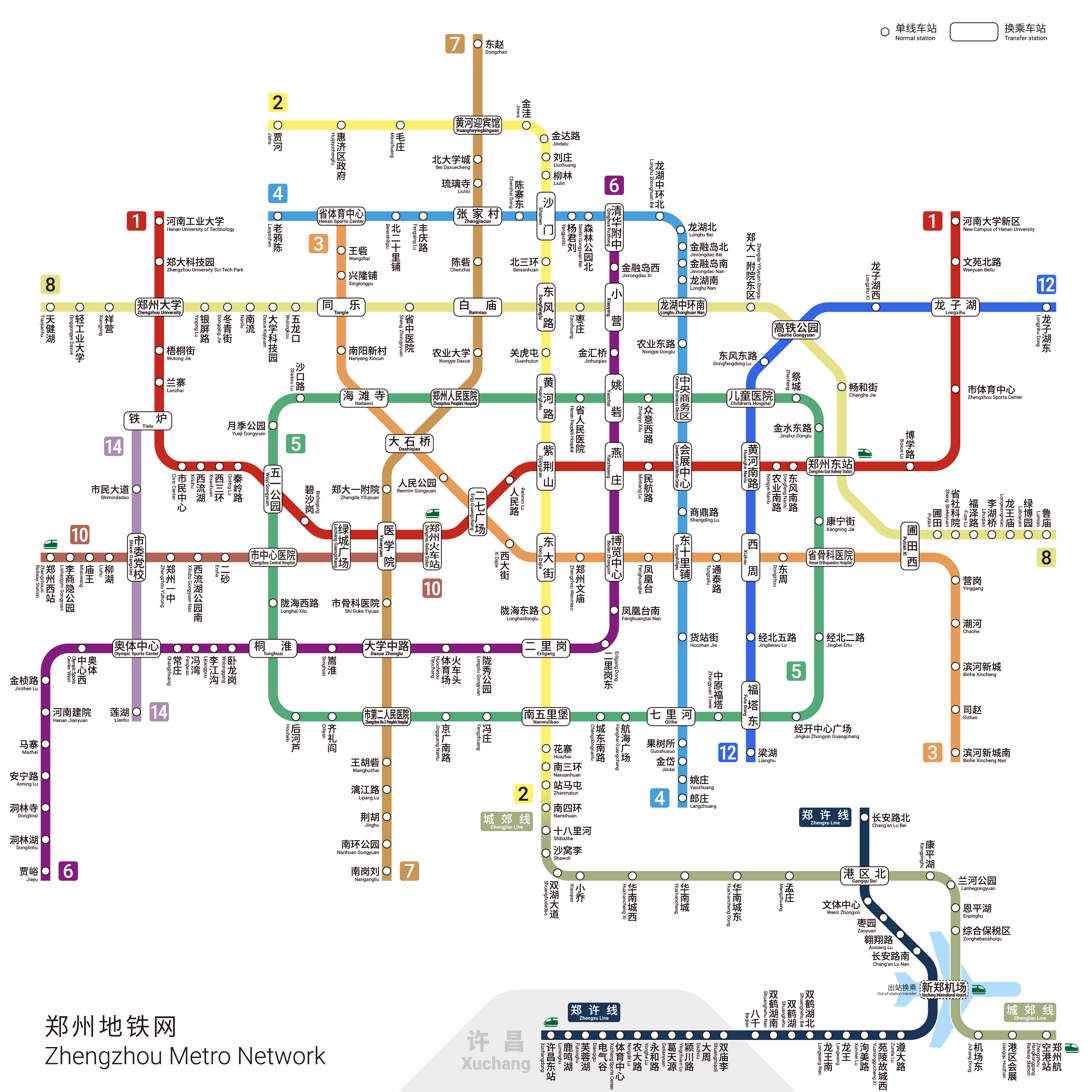

Zhengzhou Metro
- Traditional Chinese: 鄭州地鐵
- Simplified Chinese: 郑州地铁
Transcriptions
Standard Mandarin
- Hanyu Pinyin: Zhèngzhōu Dìtiě

Zhengzhou Metro (simplified Chinese: 郑州地铁; traditional Chinese: 鄭州地鐵; pinyin: Zhèngzhōu Dìtiě) is a rapid transit rail network serving urban and suburban districts of Zhengzhou, the capital city of Henan province. It is operated by the state-owned Zhengzhou Metro Group. As of December 2024, the network has 13 operational lines, with a network length of 450 km (279.6 mi) and 217 stations. Opened on 28 December 2013, it is the first metro system in Henan province, and 18th in mainland China.

== History ==
Evolution of Zhengzhou Metro

=== "Project 7401" ===
The history of the metro network in Zhengzhou dates back to 1974, when the first metro project in Zhengzhou was planned. It was called as the "Project 7401", since it was the first project approved by the CPC Henan Provincial Committee in 1974. The project was designed for both civilian and military use, as a single track metro line in peacetime, and could be used for civil defense during war. The first phase was planned to start at Huayuan Road (near Zijingshan), then move westward via Erqi Square, and ends at the Cable Factory on Funiu Road, with 6 stations. Part of the planned route was similar to the route of the current Line 1. Construction began in 1975, and stopped in 1980, when the project was finally called off. Some sections of the tunnels and one station in Bishagang (not the current Bishagang station) had been completed then. The completed station was transformed into an underground department store in 1982.

=== The First Round of Construction ===
In 2000, the planning of the current Zhengzhou Metro system was started. The plan had been adjusted several times, and was finalized in 2008. The first phase of the system, including Line 1 and Line 2, was approved by National Development and Reform Commission (NDRC) in February 2009. Construction of Line 1 started on 6 June 2009 and Line 2 started construction on 28 December 2010. As planned, Line 1 and Line 2 commenced operations on 26 December 2013 and 19 August 2016 respectively. On January 12, 2017, Chengjiao line started operation. It is in through services with Line 2 and allows the system to serve the Zhengzhou Xinzheng International Airport.

=== The Second Round of Construction ===
In April 2014, the NDRC published the Construction Plan of Zhengzhou Rapid Transit System (2014-2020), marking the start of the second round of construction. The plan includes the Line 1 Phase II, Line 2 Phase II, Line 3 Phase I, Line 4, and Line 5, with a total length of 120.7 kilometres (75.0 mi). The second phase of Line 1 was put into use on 12 January 2017, Line 5 opened on 20 May 2019. Line 2 Phase II opened on 28 December 2019. Line 3 and Line 4 opened on 26 December 2020.

=== The Third Round of Construction ===
In April 2019, the NDRC approved the Phase III Construction Plan of Zhengzhou Rapid Transit System (2019-2024), marking the start of the third round of construction. The plan includes the Line 3 Phase II, and the first phase of Line 6, Line 7, Line 8, Line 10, Line 12 and Line 14 with a total length of 159.6 kilometres (99.2 mi). Line 10 and Line 14 are already under construction. Line 14 was opened on 19 September 2019.

== Accidents and incidents ==
- On 22 February 2013, four workers were buried at the construction site of Tongbailu station (current Wuyigongyuan station) due to collapse. Two of them were killed and the other two injured.
- On 31 July 2018, 12 workers at the construction site of Zhengzhou People's Hospital station on Line 5 were sent to hospital for feeling headache and nausea caused by lack of oxygen.

=== July 2021 floods ===
Beginning on July 17, 2021, heavy rains occurred in Henan. The rainfall in Zhengzhou from 20:20 on July 17 to 20:20 on July 20 reached 617.1 mm (24.30 in), of which the rainfall within an hour from 16:00 to 17:00 on July 20 reached 201.9 mm (7.95 in). It broke through historical records, far exceeding the "24-hour rainfall exceeding 200 mm (7.87 in)" extreme rainstorm level designated by the National Meteorological Center.

On July 20, many stations were flooded with heavy water, which caused serious water accumulation. A landslide accident occurred at a construction site of Longzihu Xi of Line 12 in the morning, but no casualties were caused.

At about 18:00 on July 20, rainwater entered the tunnel between Haitansi station and Shakoulu station of Line 5. A train was trapped in the tunnel and water flooded. The water level in the car once reached the chest position, and passengers stranded in the car were trapped for several hours, until they were rescued and left the carriage. The floods in Zhengzhou Metro killed 14 people.

Zhengzhou Metro closed several stations, and then announced the suspension of operation of the whole system at 18:00 on July 20.

Line 1, Line 2 (Liuzhuang to Nansihuan section) and Chengjiao line reopened on September 12. Line 2 (Jiahe to Liuzhuang section), Line 3, Line 4 and Line 5 reopened on September 15. Due to equipment replacement, Line 14 reopened later on 29 August 2022.

Some of trains were damaged in the floods while they were in service or stabling in the depots. After the floods, most of them were taken out of service, received electrical reconstructions and tested before they returned to service. One train assigned for Line 5 was damaged in floods and subsequently sent for scrap.

== Lines in operation ==
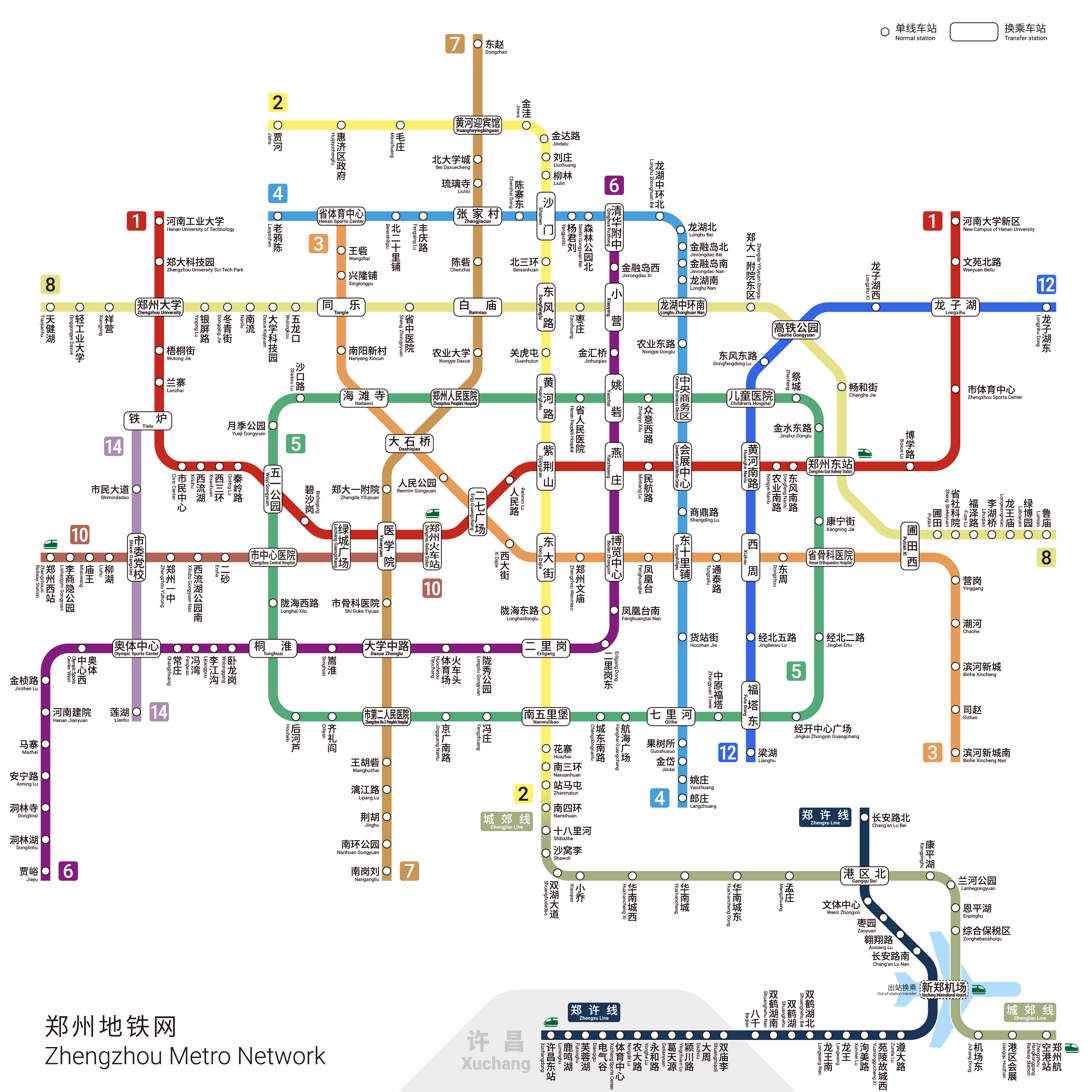
Schematic map of Zhengzhou Subway lines in operation. (Not to scale)

Line	Termini (District)		Commencement	Newest Extension	Length (km)	Stations
1	Henan University of Technology (Zhongyuan)	New Campus of Henan University (Jinshui)	28 December 2013	21 November 2019	41.20	30
2	Jiahe (Huiji)	Nansihuan (Note: Through operation between Line 2 and Chengjiao line is currently provided, meaning all trains of Chengjiao line through operate into Line 2 via Nansihuan station, but some trains of Line 2 still terminate here. However, Chengjiao line is planned to extend to the downtown via Shibalihe station and rename to Line 9 in future, henceforth splitting apart, and then the section from Nansihuan to Shibalihe will also be given back to Line 2.) (Guancheng)	19 August 2016	28 December 2019	30.89	22
3	Henan Sports Center (Huiji)	Binhe Xincheng Nan (Guancheng)	26 December 2020	8 September 2023	31.80	25
4	Laoyachen (Huiji)	Langzhuang (Guancheng)	26 December 2020	—	29.20	27
5 Loop line	Yueji Gongyuan (Zhongyuan)	Yueji Gongyuan (Zhongyuan)	20 May 2019	—	40.40	32
6	Jiayu (Xingyang)	Qinghua Fuzhong (Jinshui)	30 September 2022	30 November 2024	43.41	28
7	Dongzhao (Huiji)	Nangangliu (Erqi)	29 December 2024	—	26.8	27
8	Tianjianhu (Zhongyuan)	Lumiao (Zhongmu)	29 December 2024	—	51.78	28
Chengjiao	Nansihuan (Guancheng)	Zhengzhou Hangkonggang Railway Station (Zhongmu)	12 January 2017	20 June 2022	40.70	18 (Note: Terminal 3 station is not in operation.)
10	Zhengzhou Railway Station (Erqi)	Zhengzhouxi Railway Station (Xingyang)	28 September 2023	—	21.85	12
12	Longzihu Dong (Jinshui)	Lianghu (Guancheng)	20 December 2023	—	16.54	11
14	Tielu (Zhongyuan)	Lianhu (Zhongyuan)	19 September 2019	12 May 2023	7.46	5 (Note: Xushui station is not in operation.)
Zhengxu	Chang'an Lu Bei (Xinzheng)	Xuchangdong Station (Jian'an)	28 December 2023	—	67.12	26
Total					450	284

=== Line 1 ===
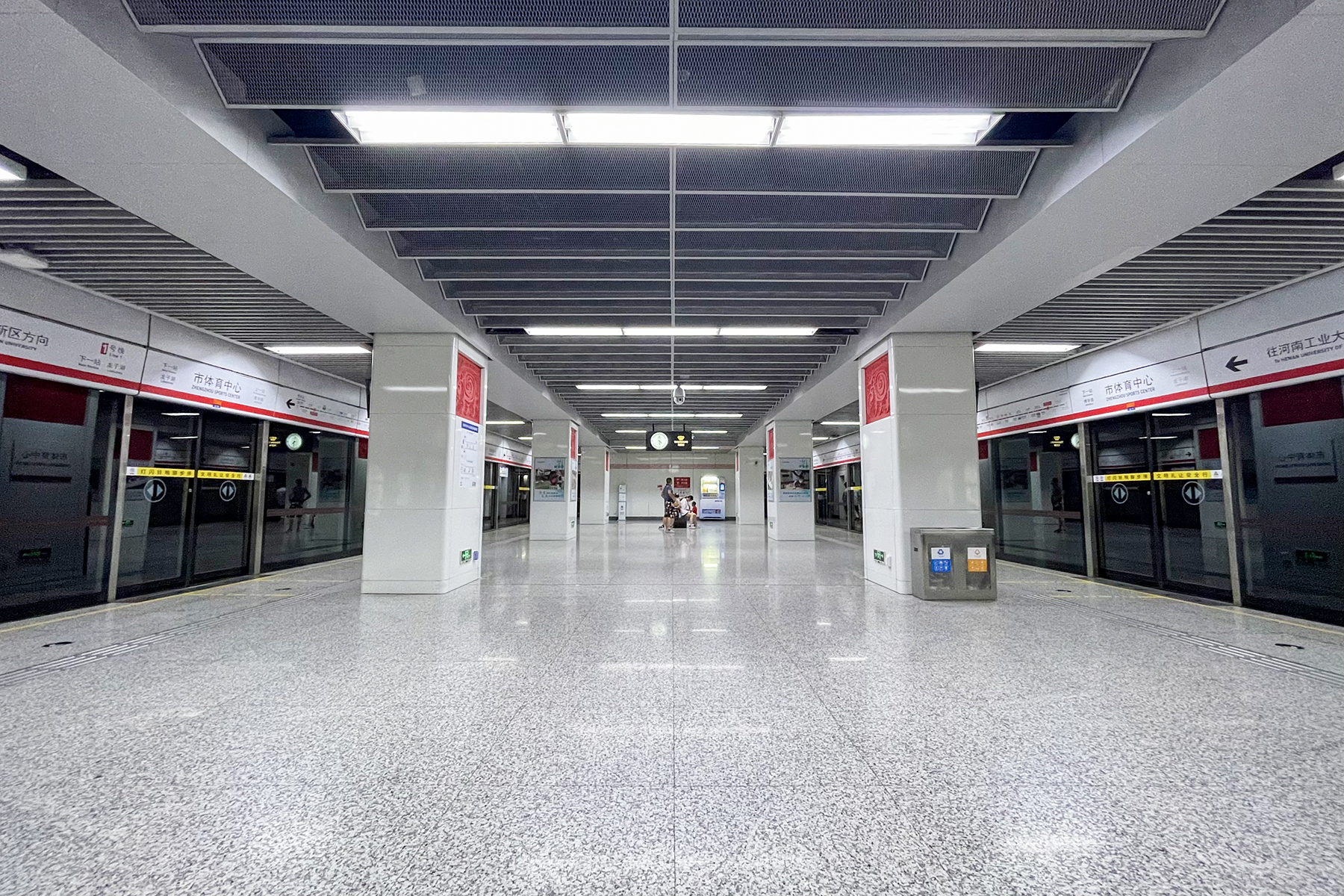
Zhengzhou Sports Center station of Line 1

Line 1 is a west–east line with a total length of 41.2 km (25.6 mi), starting from Henan University of Technology and ending in New Campus of Henan University. It interchanges with Line 2 at Zijingshan. This line connects many important places and areas of the city, including Zhengzhou University, Zhengzhou railway station, Zhengdong New Area, Zhengzhou East railway station and the Longzihu College Area. CSR Zhuzhou supplied six-car Type B metro trains for Line 1 under a contract signed in January 2011. The first phase, 26.2 km (16.3 mi) long with 20 stations, is entirely underground and was opened in 2013. On 12 January 2017, both east and west extensions of the line opened, adding 15.01 km (9.33 mi) and 9 stations to the line. The color for Line 1 is red.

=== Line 2 ===
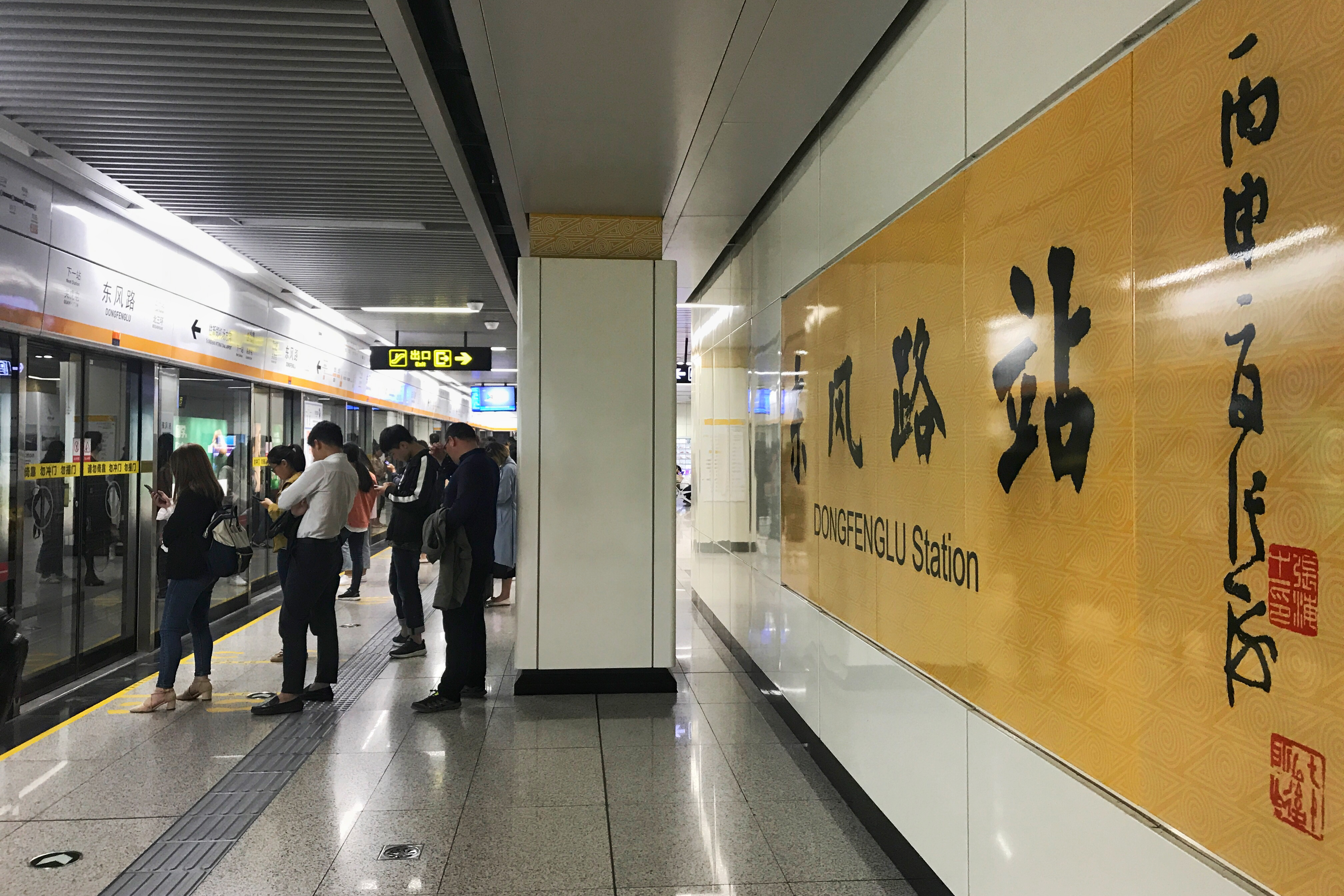
Dongfenglu station of Line 2

Line 2, a north–south line with a total length of 30.9 kilometres (19.2 mi), starts from Jiahe in Huiji District and ends in Nansihuan in Guancheng, with 22 stations. It interchanges with Line 1 at Zijingshan. The first phase of Line 2 (Liuzhuang-Nansihuan), 20.649 kilometres (12.831 mi) long with 16 stations, was opened on 19 August 2016. The second phase (north extension, from Liuzhuang to Jiahe) was opened on 28 December 2019. The second phase is 10.25 kilometres (6.37 mi) long with 6 stations. According to future plan, the southern terminus of Line 2 will be Shibalihe, which is currently operated as a station on Chengjiao line, after the completion of Line 9. The color for Line 2 is yellow.

=== Line 3 ===
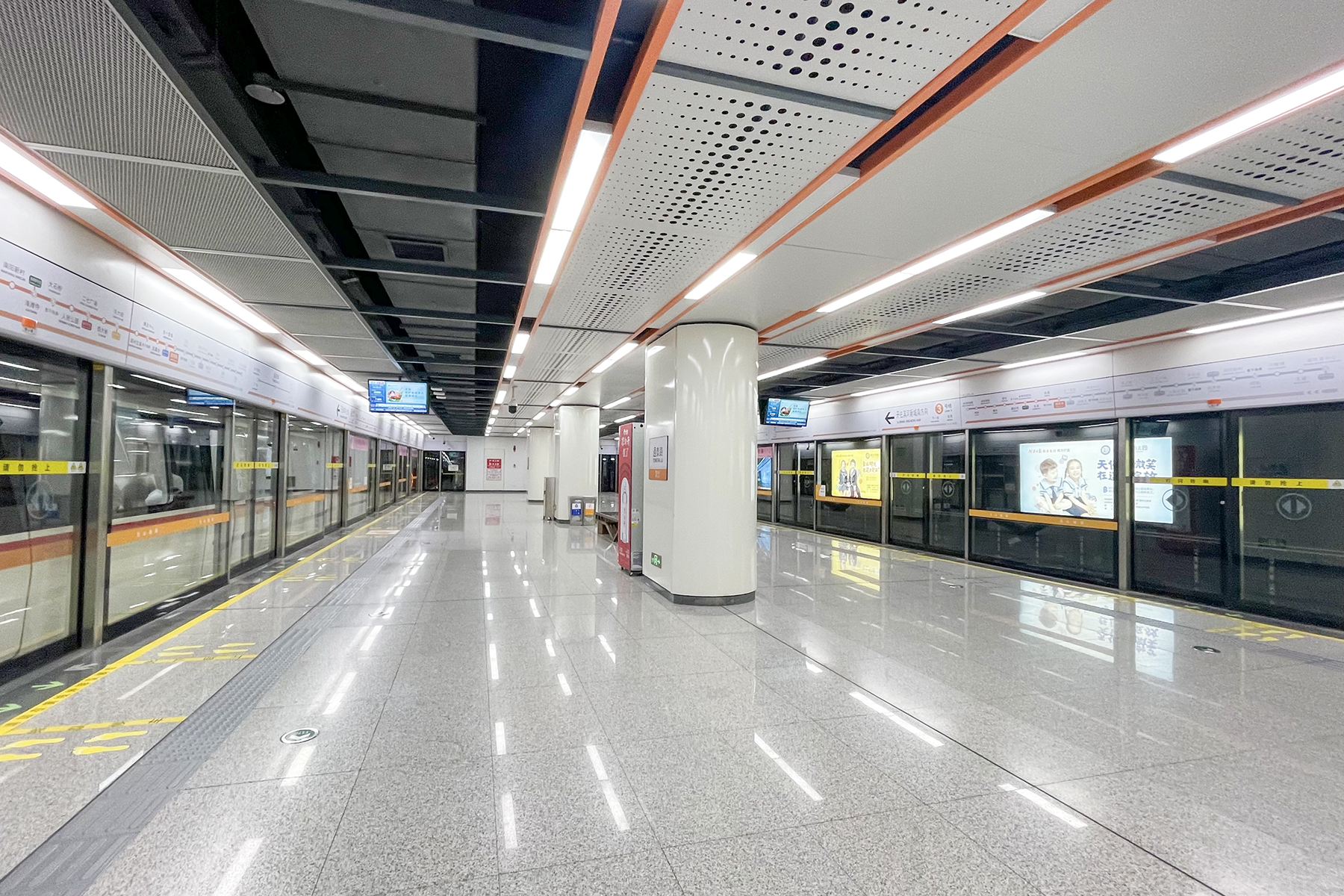
Tongtailu station of Line 3

Line 3, a northwest–southeast line, began operation on 26 December 2020. The color for Line 3 is orange.

=== Line 4 ===
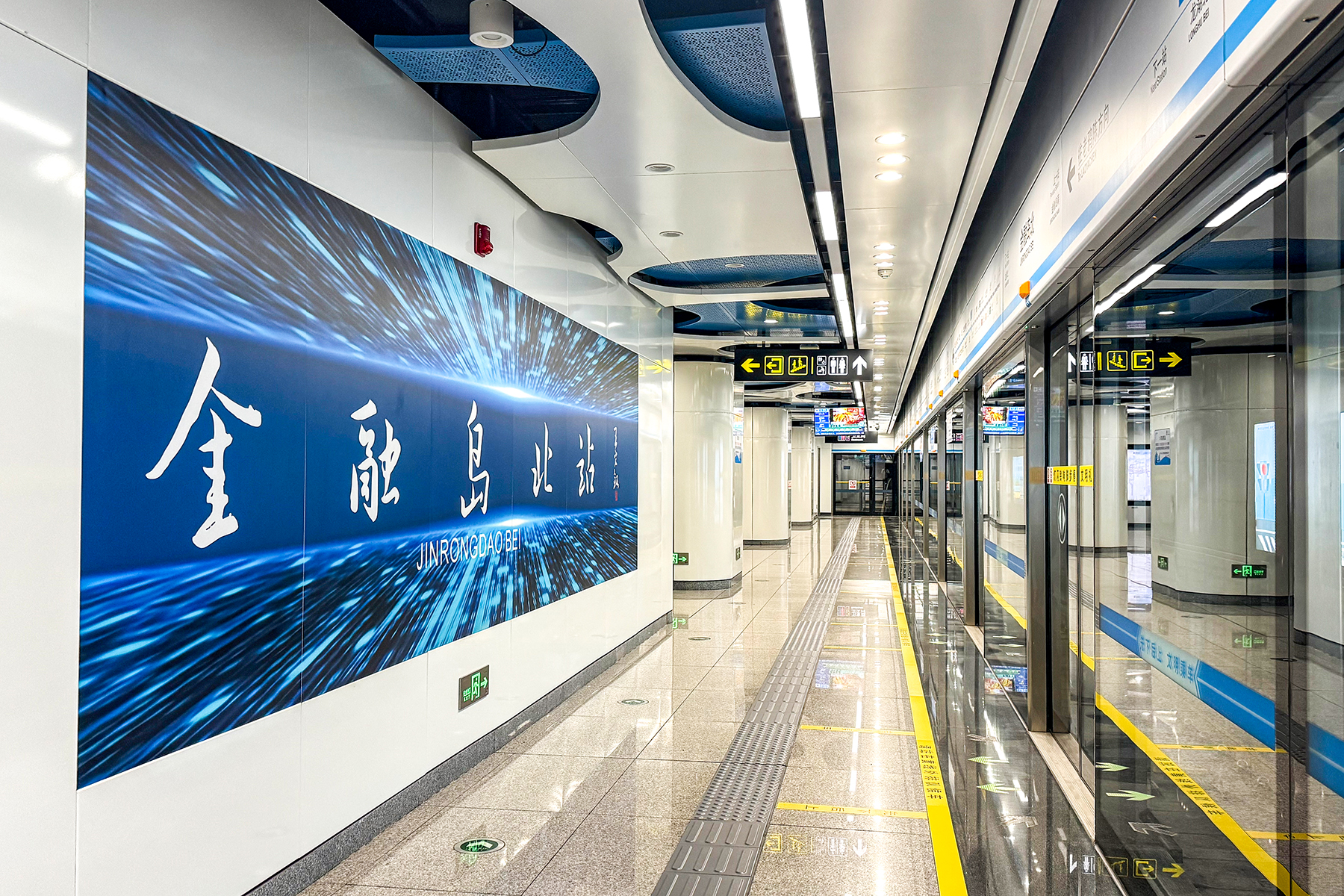
Jinrongdao Bei station of Line 4

Line 4, a northwest–southeast line, began operation on 26 December 2020. The color for Line 4 is light blue.

=== Line 5 ===
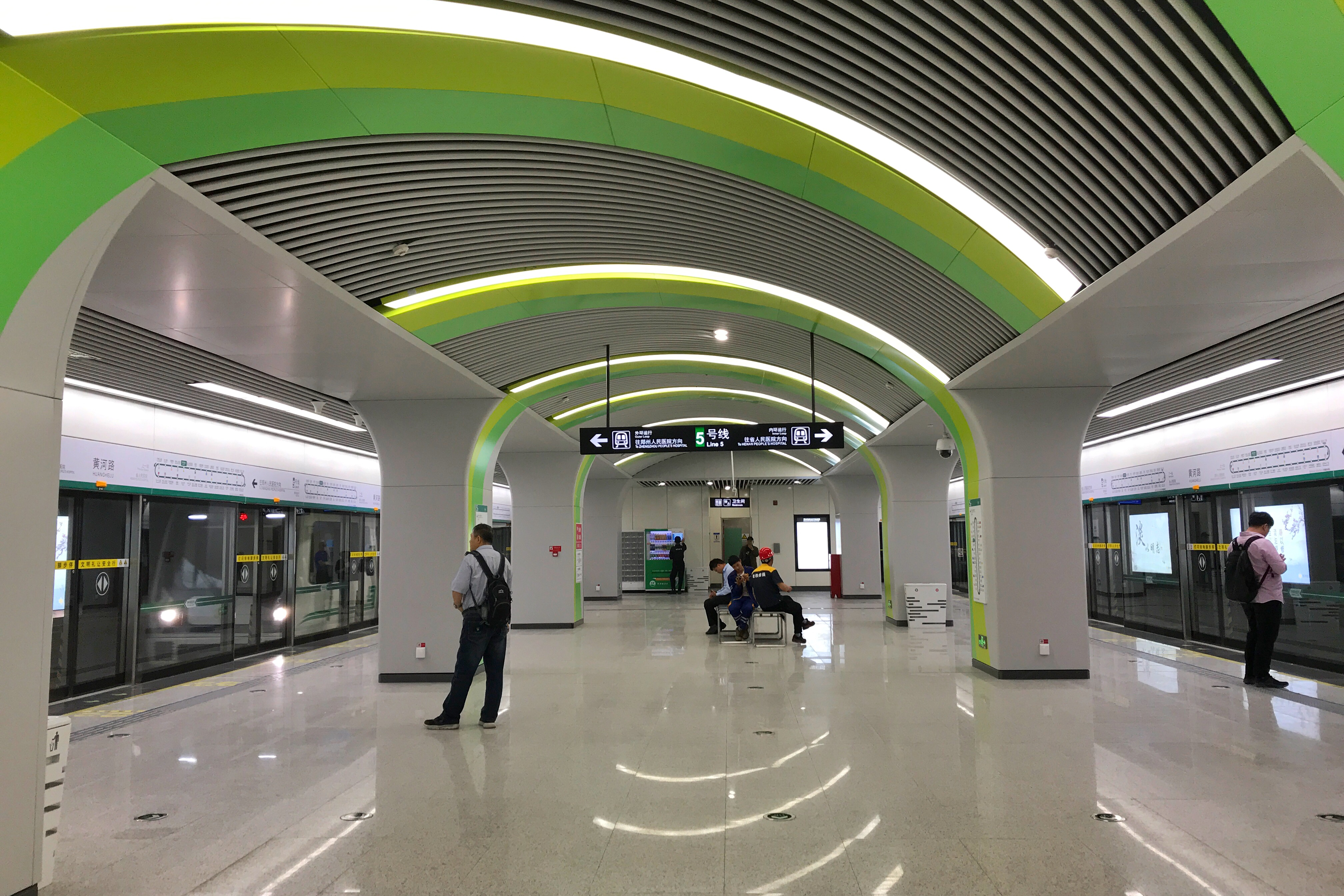
Platform of Line 5 at Huanghelu station

Line 5, the first loop line in Zhengzhou Metro system, is 40.4 kilometres (25.1 mi) long with 32 stations. It runs mainly under Huanghe Road, Shangwu Outer Ring Road, Xinyi Road, Hanghai Road, Tongbai Road and Xizhan Road, forming a loop around the city center. Line 5 opened on 20 May 2019. An infill station, Jingbeierlu station opened on 15 May 2021. It is also the first metro line in Zhengzhou to use Type A metro trains, which were manufactured by CRRC Zhuzhou Locomotive. The color for Line 5 is green.

=== Line 6 ===
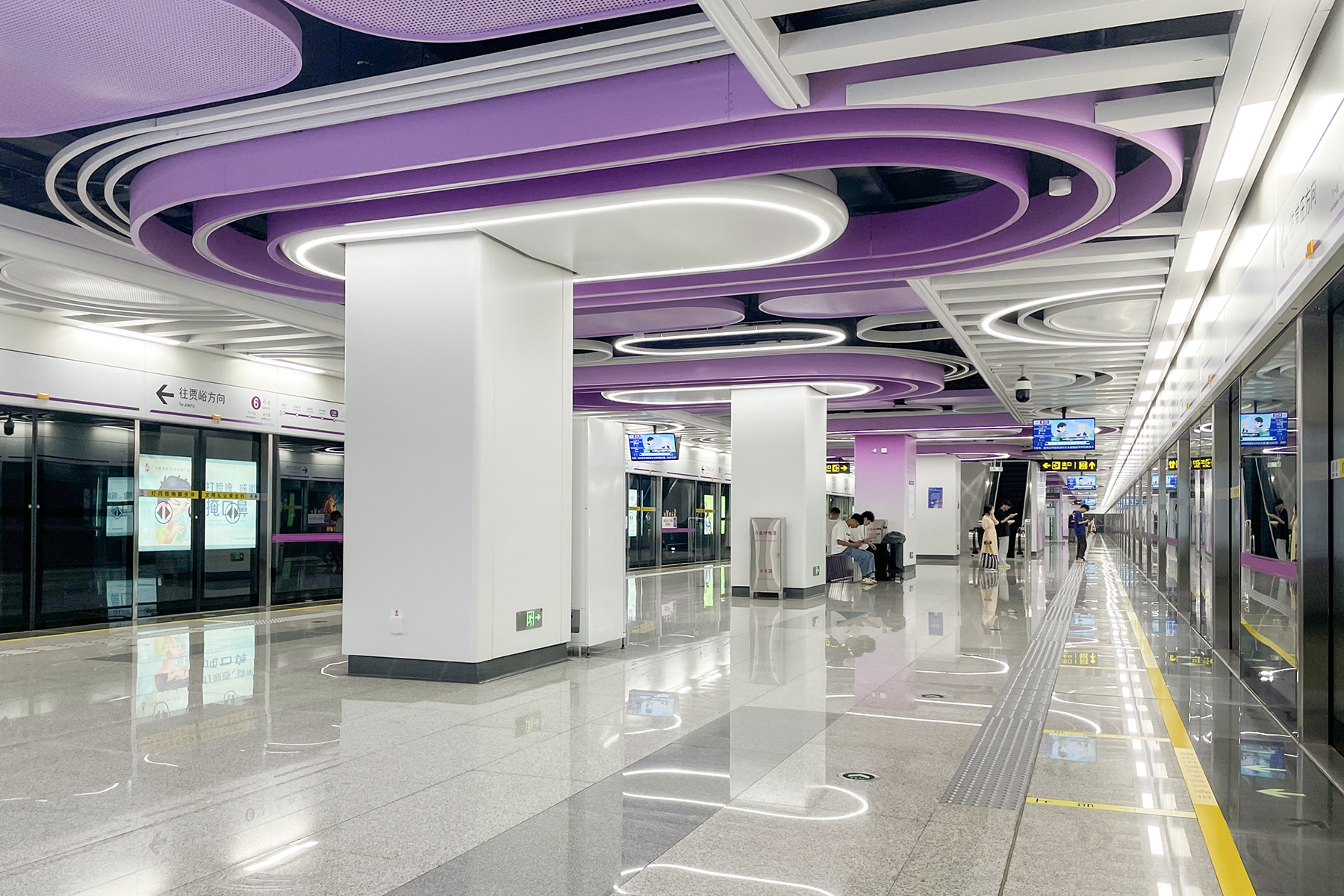
Mazhai station of Line 6

Line 6, a west–east line, began operation on 30 September 2022. The color for Line 6 is purple.

=== Line 7 ===
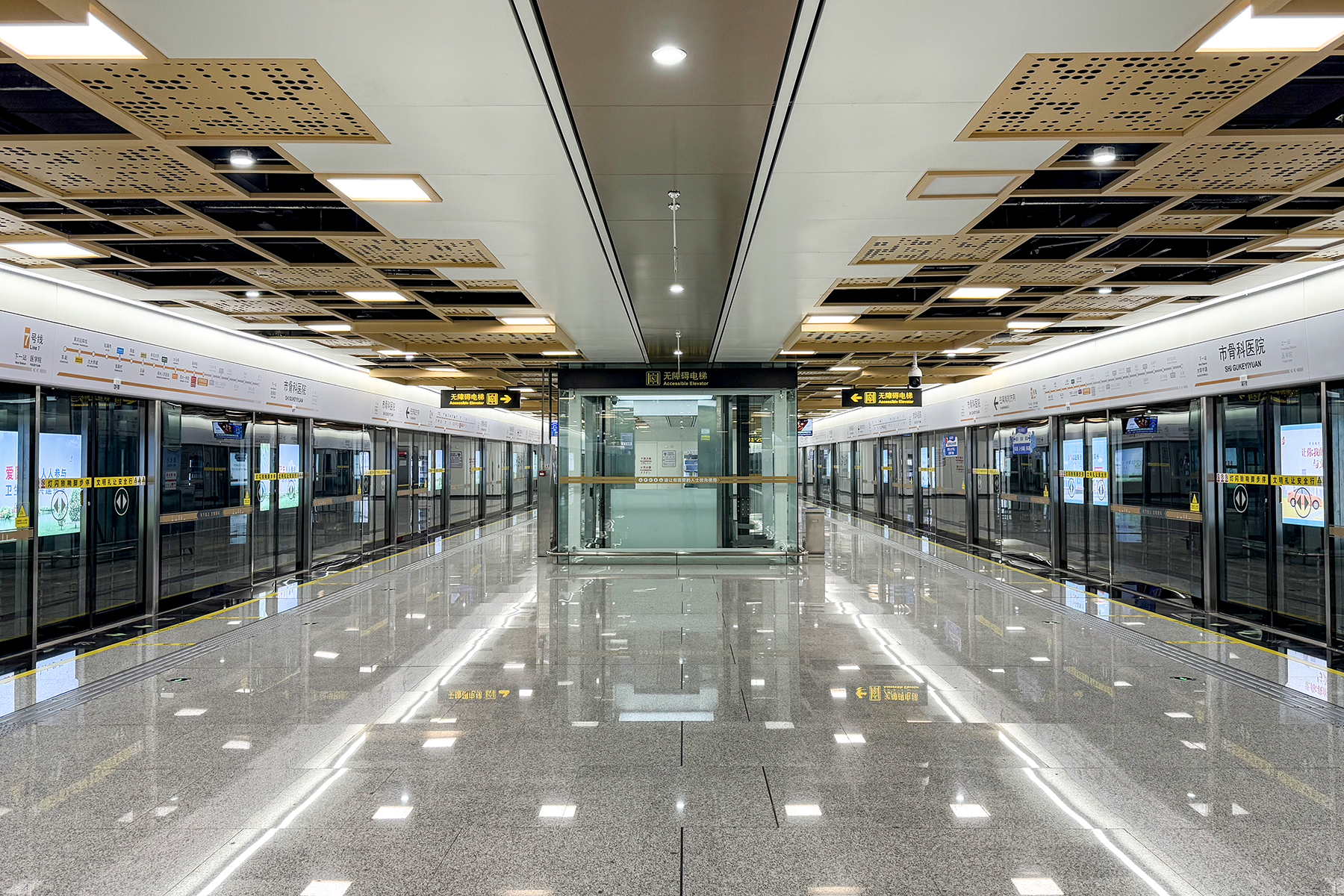
Shi Gukeyiyuan station of Line 7

Line 7 began operation on 29 December 2024. The color for Line 7 is bronze.

=== Line 8 ===
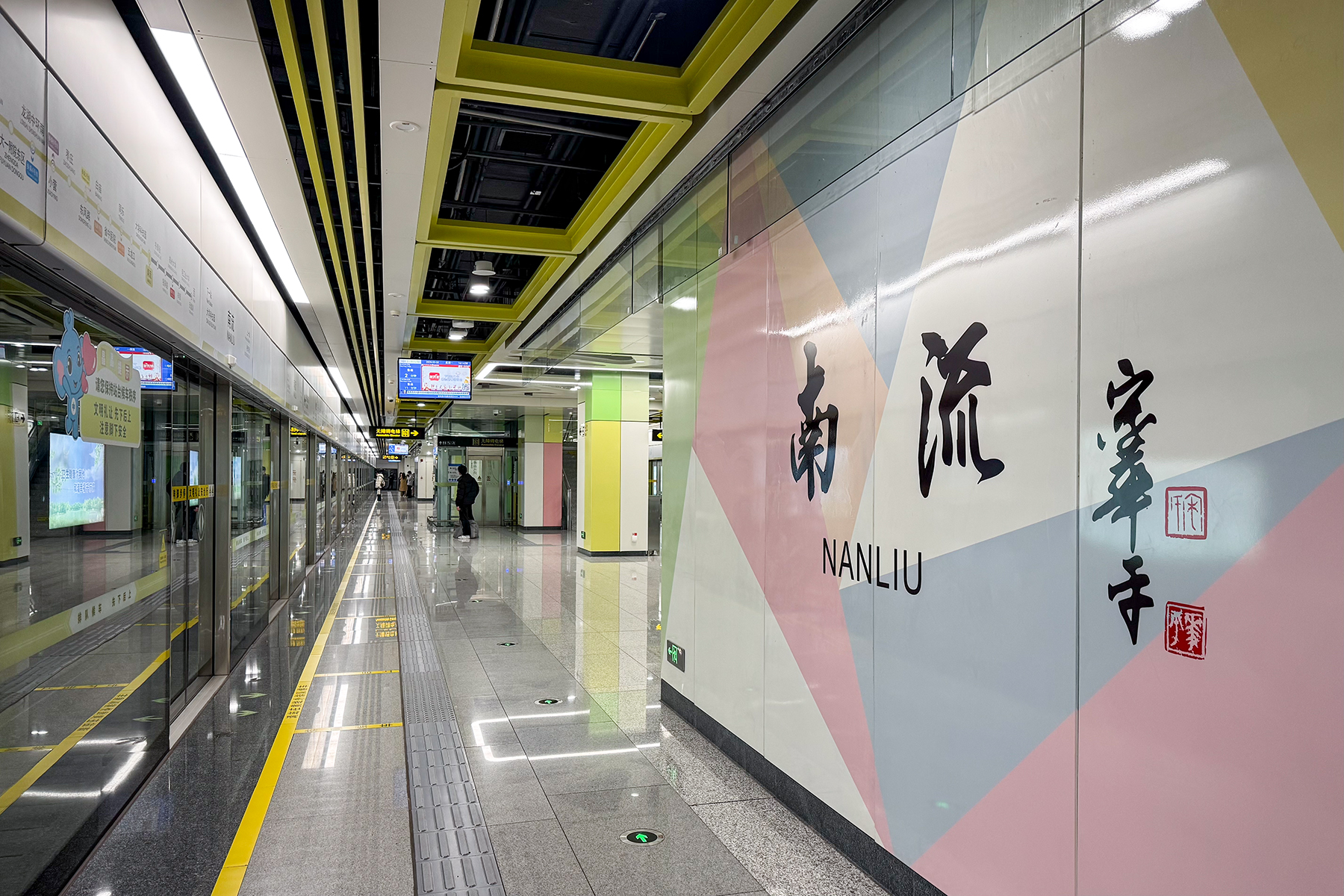
Nanliu station of Line 8

Line 8 began operation on 29 December 2024. The color for Line 8 is cream.

=== Chengjiao line ===
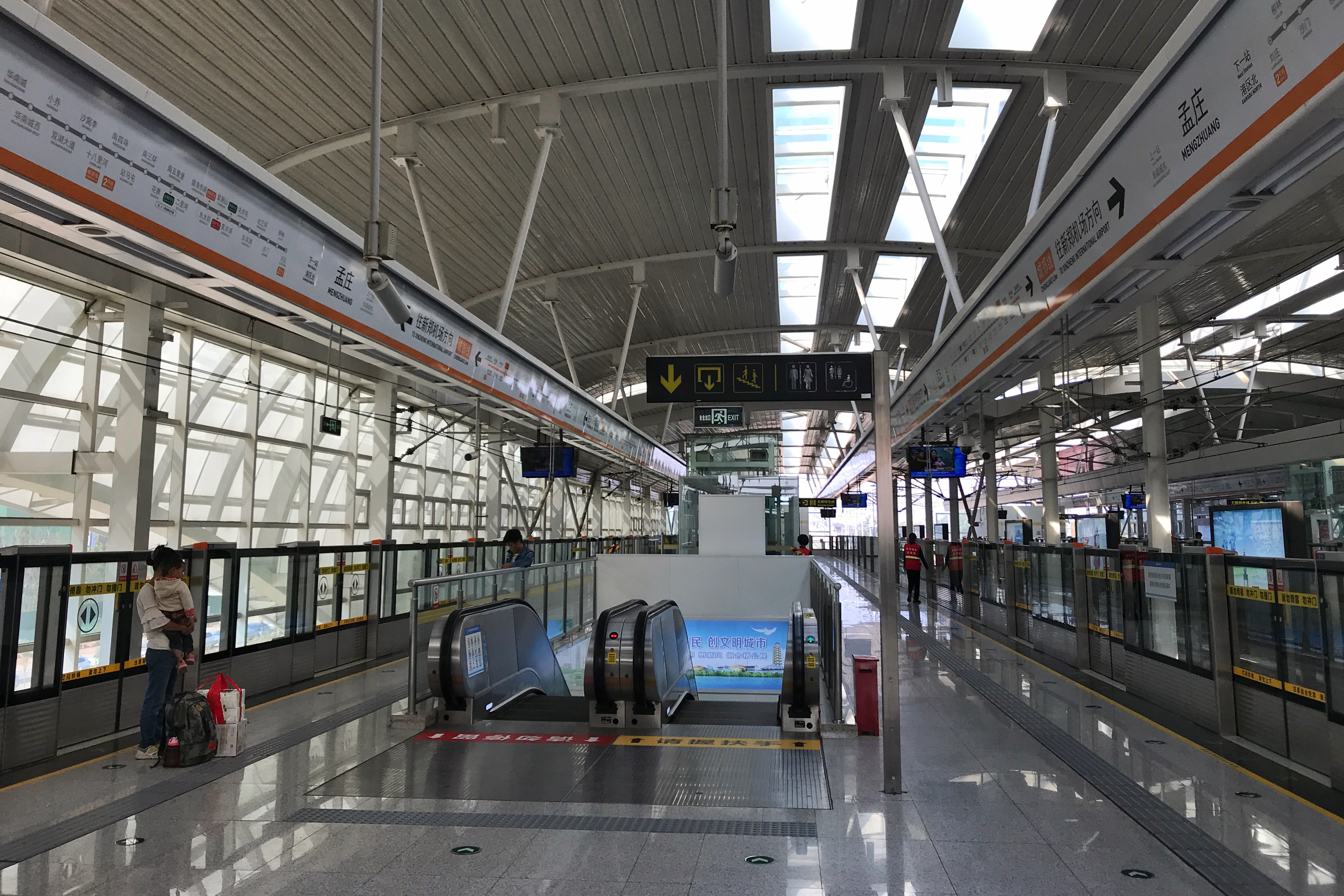
Mengzhuang station of Chengjiao line

Chengjiao line is a suburban metro line with a total length of 31.7 kilometres (19.7 mi), starting from Nansihuan in Guancheng and ending in Xinzheng International Airport, with 14 stations. This line was opened on January 12, 2017. The line connects the city with Longhu Town, Zhengzhou Airport Economy Zone and Zhengzhou Xinzheng International Airport. Trains on this line are currently in through operation with Line 2.

Chengjiao line has the same yellow color as Line 2 on the signs, although the system map on Zhengzhou Metro's website shows this line with the color of olive, which is the color for Line 9. According to the plan, Chengjiao line will be operated as a part of Line 9 in the future.

=== Line 10 ===
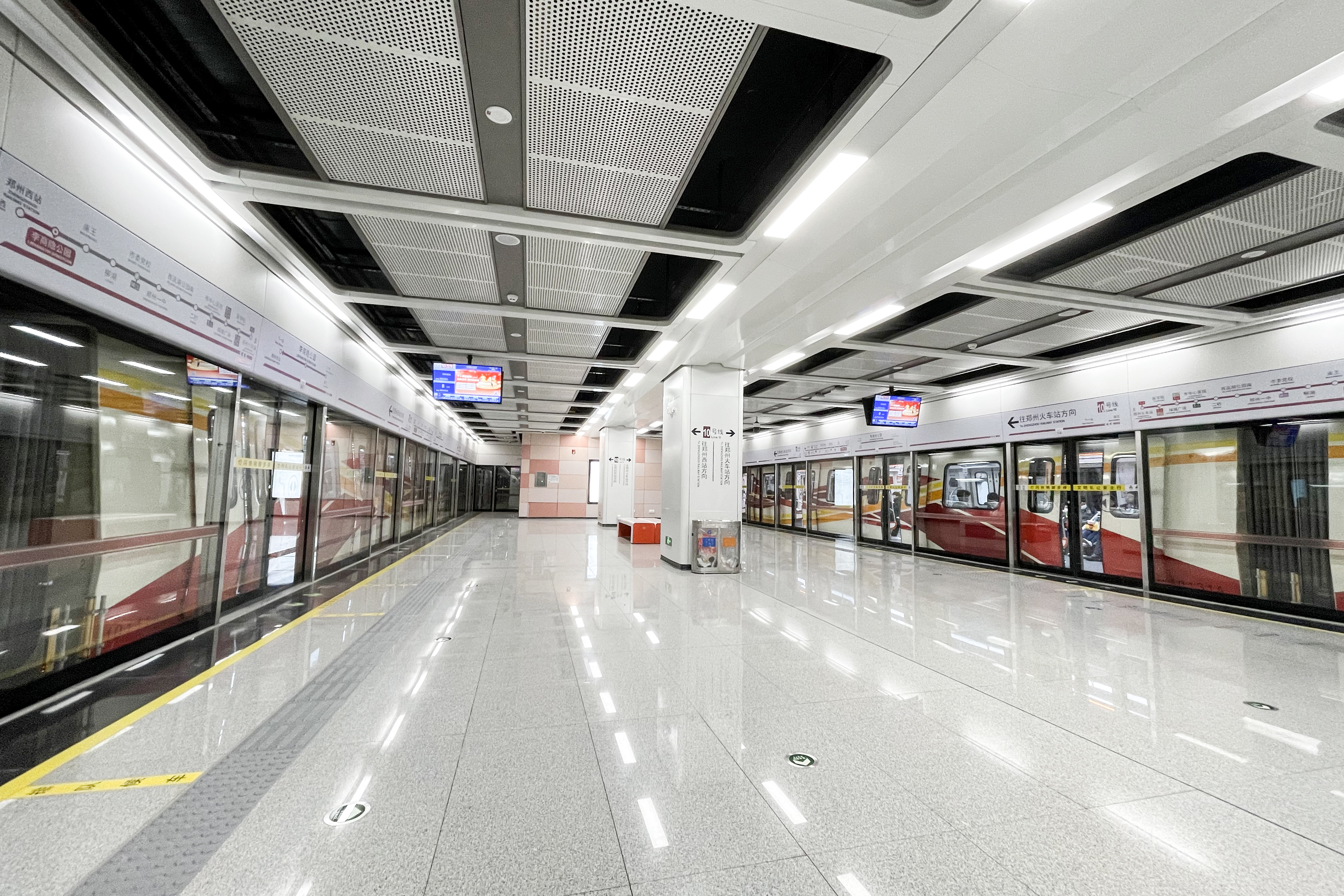
Lishangyin Gongyuan station of Line 10

Line 10, a west–east line, began operation on 28 September 2023. A further extension of Line 10 from Zhengzhouxi Railway Station to Zhengzhou Shangjie Airport (in Shangjie District of Zhengzhou) is under planning. The color for Line 10 is brown.

=== Line 12 ===
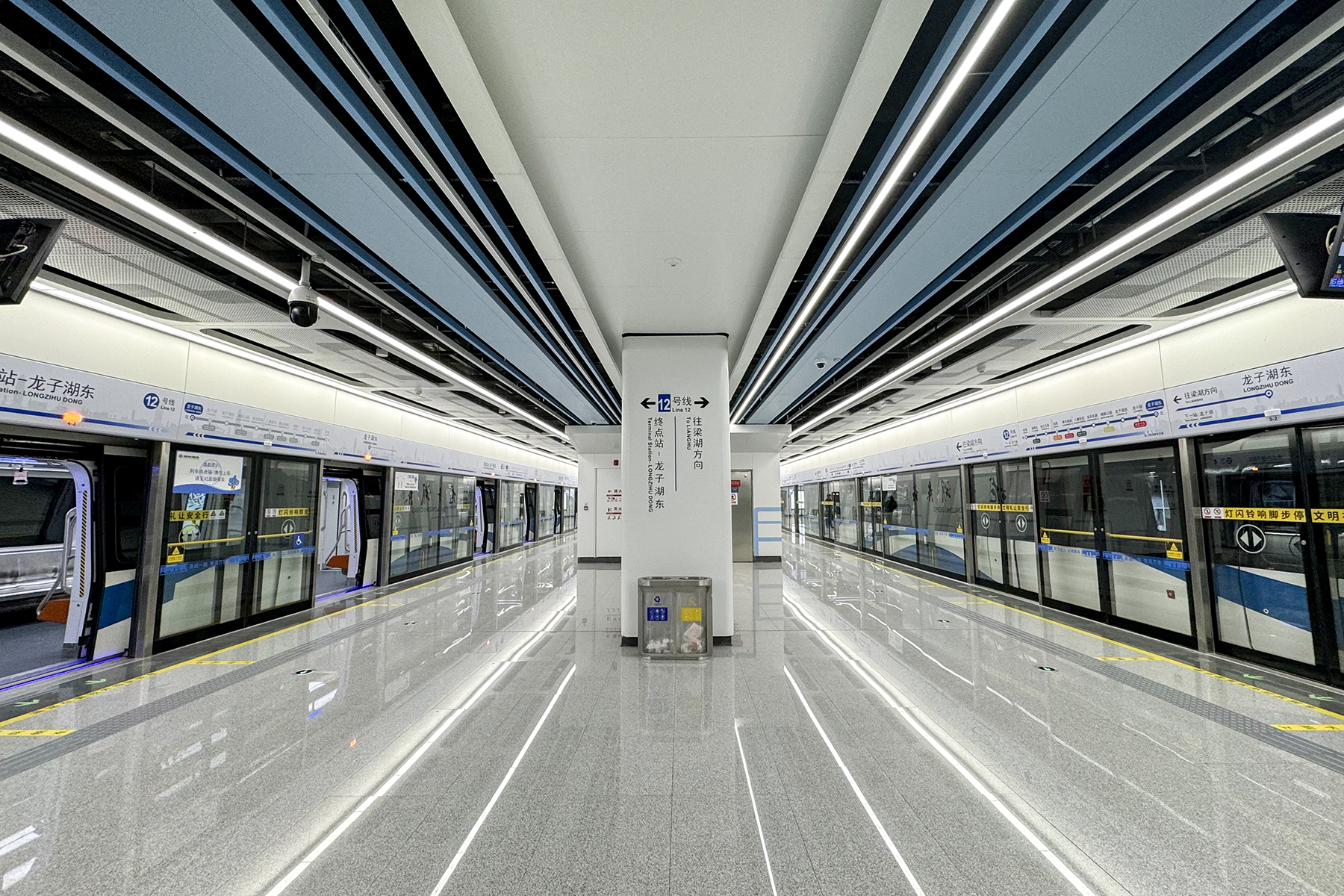
Longzihu Dong station of Line 12

Line 12 began operation on 20 December 2023. The color for Line 12 is blue.

=== Line 14 ===
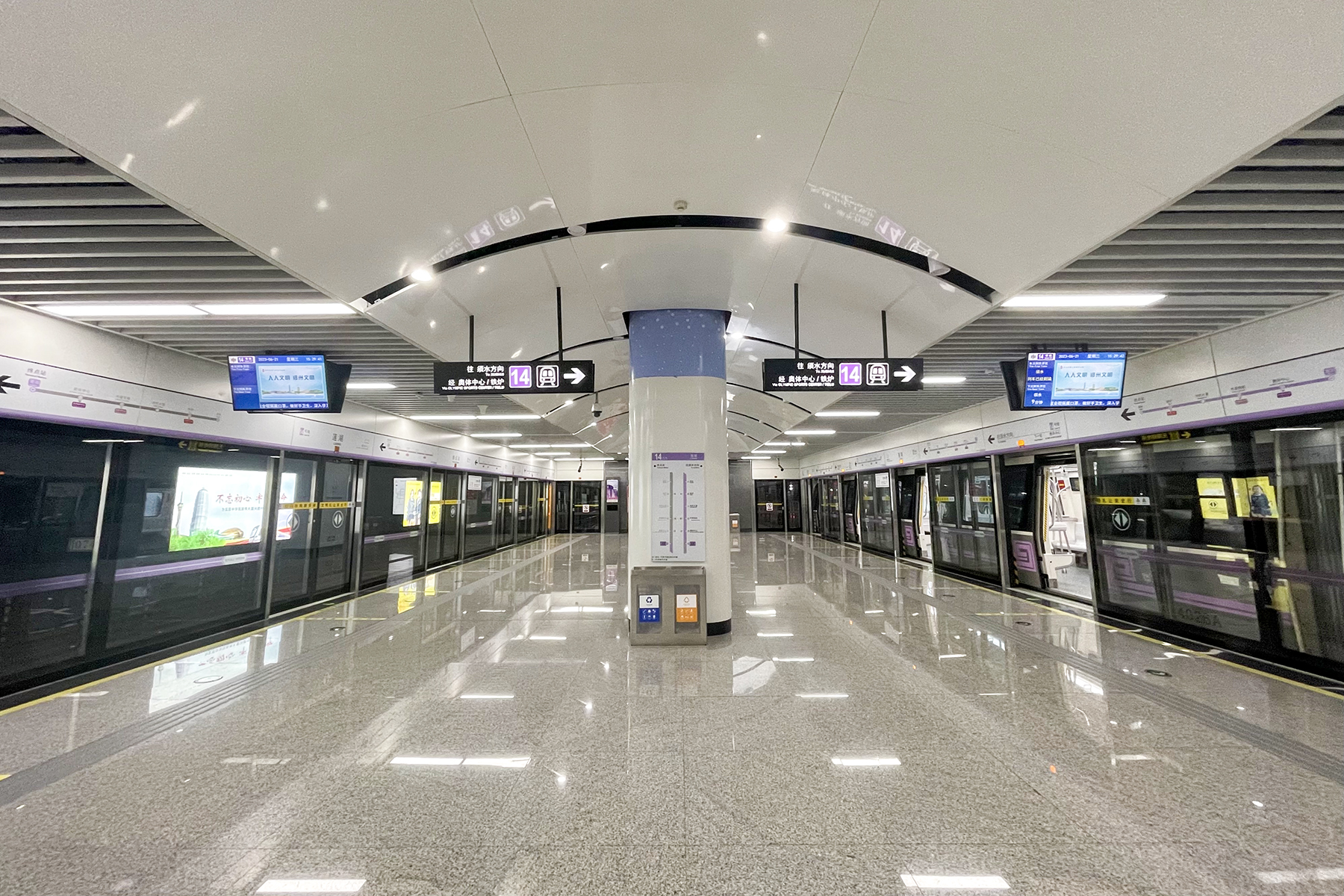
Lianhu station of Line 14

Line 14 is 7.455 kilometres (4.632 mi) long with 6 stations (4 stations in operation). Line 14 was opened on 19 September 2019. The color for Line 14 is light purple.

=== Zhengxu line ===
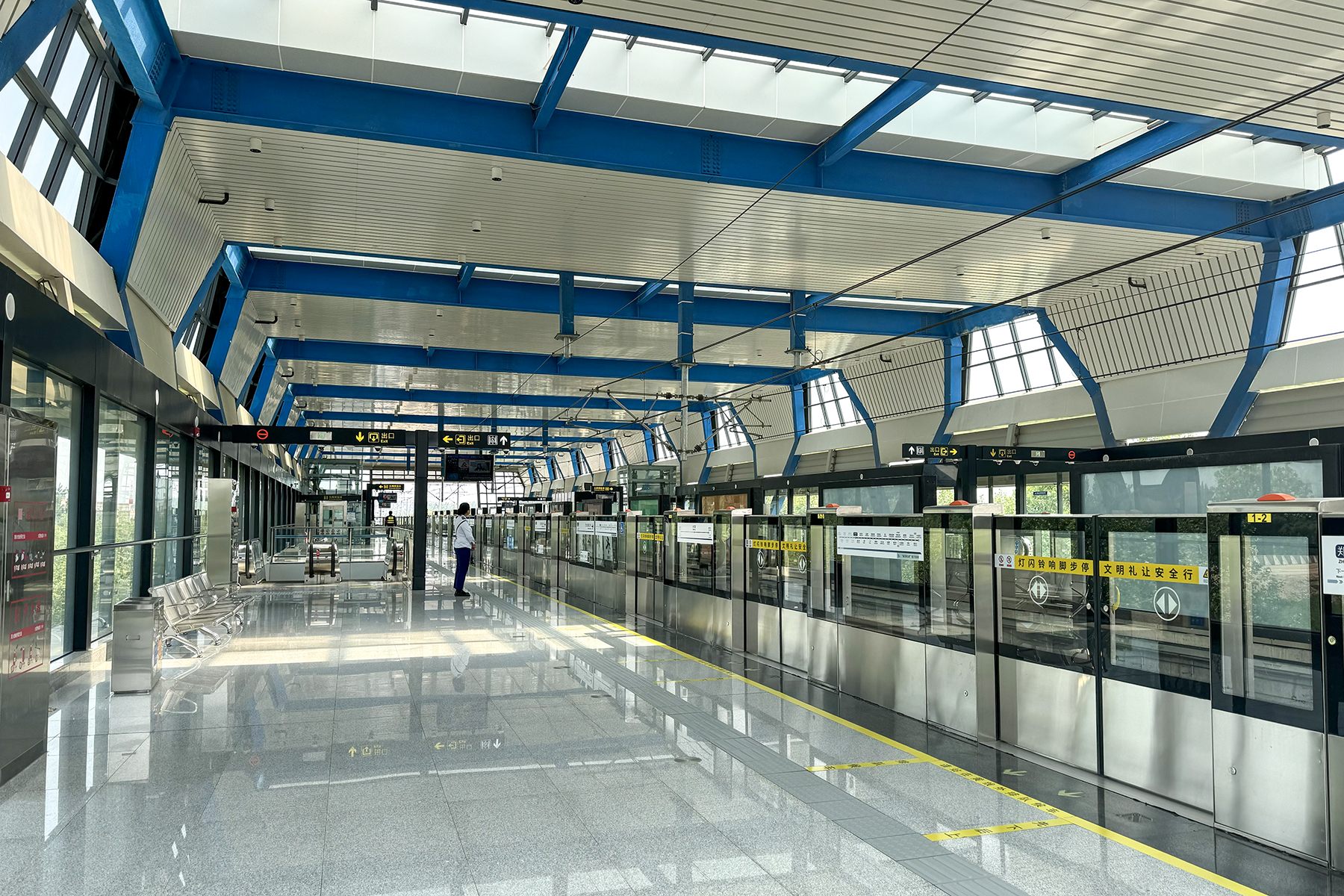
Yonghe Lu station of Zhengxu Line

Zhengxu line, formerly known as Line 17 during planning, opened on 28 December 2023. The color for Zhengxu line is dark blue.

== Future lines ==
=== Future Network Map ===
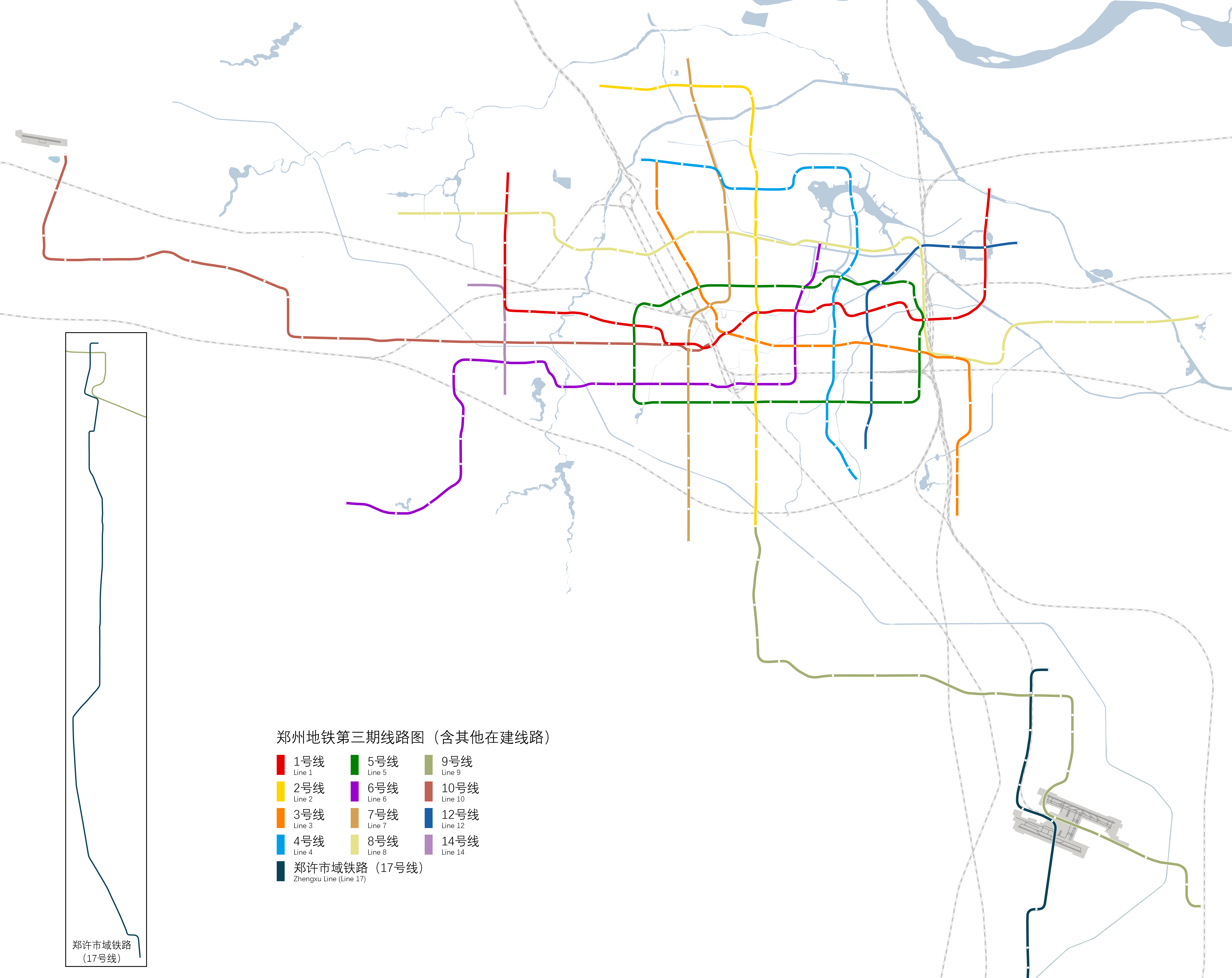

== Fares and tickets ==
Fares of Zhengzhou Metro are calculated by distance traveled, ranging from ¥2 (within 6 km (3.7 mi)) to ¥9 (the longest journeys within the current system). A journey shorter than 6 km (3.7 mi) costs ¥2; ¥1 is charged for every 7 km (4.3 mi) after 6 km (3.7 mi), every 8 km (5.0 mi) after 13 km (8.1 mi), and every 9 km (5.6 mi) after 21 km (13 mi). The system is free of charge for elderly citizens in Zhengzhou with ages above 60 during non-peak hours and on public holidays. Children under the height of 130 cm (51 in) may ride for free when accompanied by an adult. There are also student fares, which are half the adult fare, for full-time students enrolled in primary or middle schools.

=== Single journey ticket ===
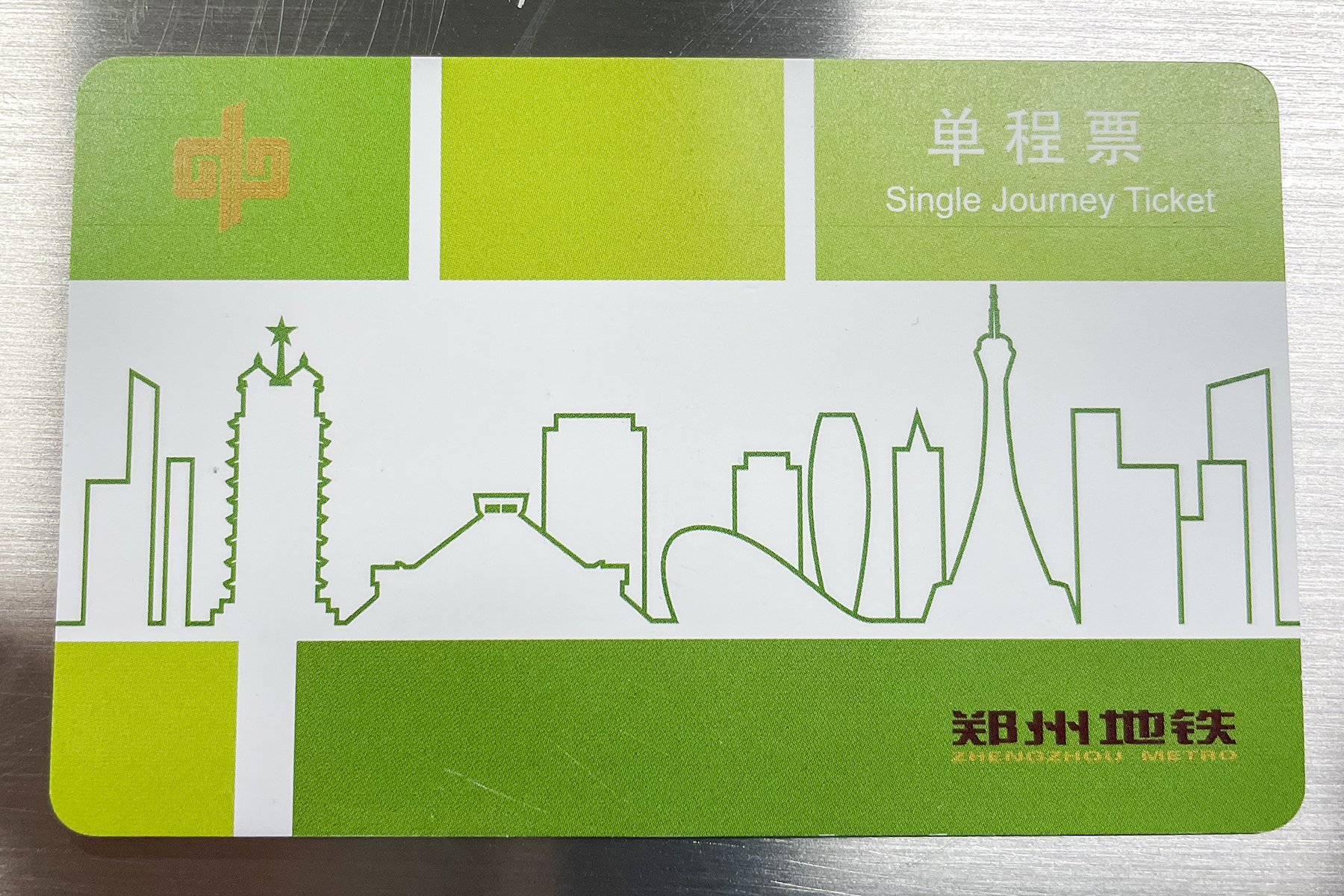
Zhengzhou Metro single journey ticket

Single journey tickets can be bought on the ticket vending machines at every station. The passenger has to tap it on the sensor on the ticket gate when entering and insert it into a slot at the exit gate where the ticket is reclaimed. From 1 June 2016, passengers can buy single journey tickets with WeChat or Alipay in advance and collect the tickets at stations.

In September 2017, the "Cloud Gate" service was launched, which allows passengers to enter and exit with barcodes generated with AliPay on smartphones. Currently the service is only available on 20 stations between Xiliuhu and Zhengzhou Sports Center of Line 1.

=== Lü Cheng Tong ===
Lü Cheng Tong (Chinese: 绿城通, literally: "Green City Pass") is a rechargeable contactless smart card which can be used on the metro and buses in Zhengzhou with discounts. A 5% discount is offered for taking Zhengzhou Metro using Lü Cheng Tong compared to using single journey tickets.

== Rolling stock ==
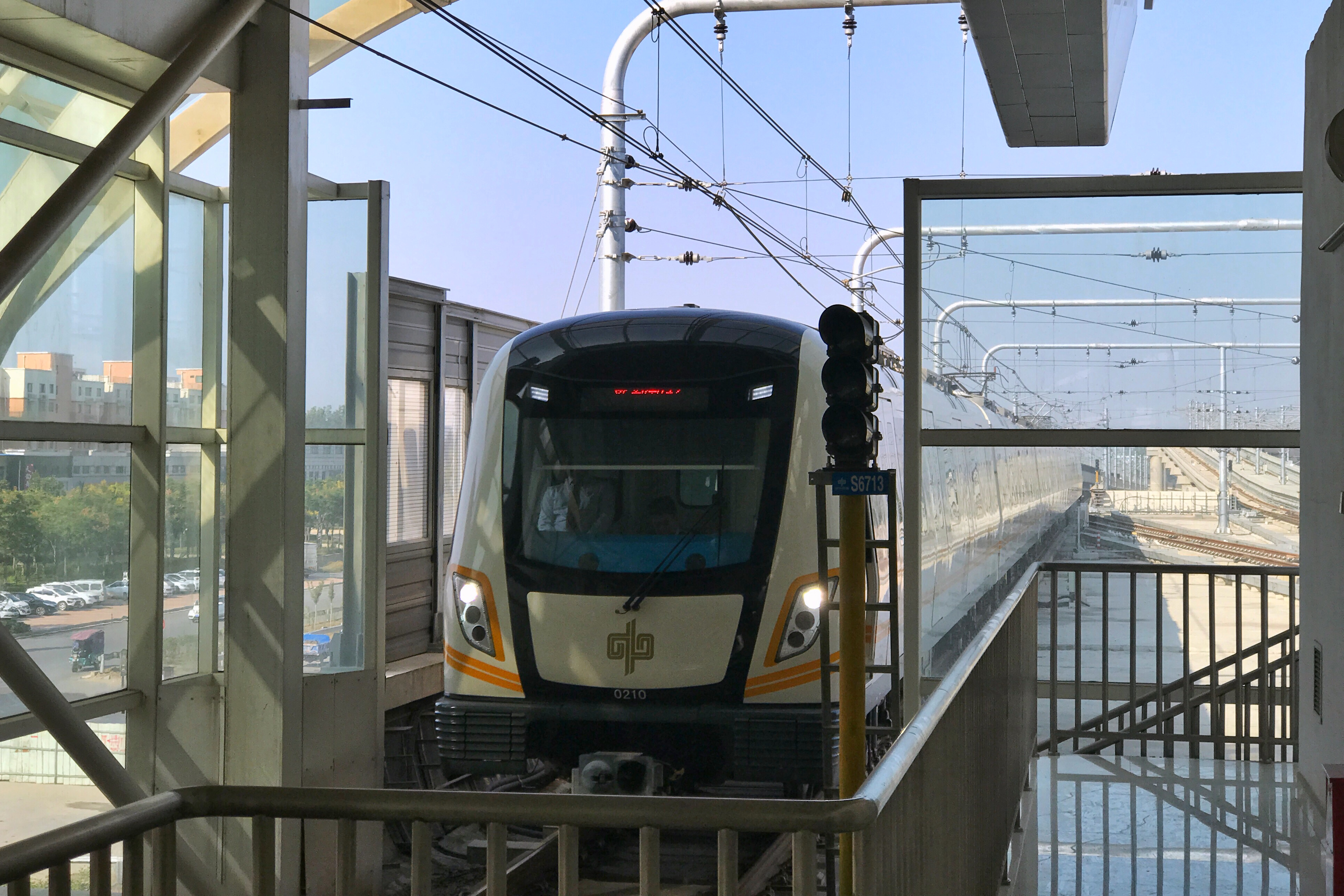
A CRRC Zhuzhou made trainset on Chengjiao line

=== Line 1 ===
- CRRC Zhuzhou Type B 6-car sets
- CRRC Qingdao Sifang Type B 6-car sets

=== Line 2 and Chengjiao Line ===
- CRRC Zhuzhou Type B 6-car sets
- CRRC Qingdao Sifang Type B 6-car sets

=== Line 3 ===
- Type A 6-car sets

=== Line 4 ===
- Type B 6-car sets

=== Line 5 ===
- CRRC Zhuzhou Type A 6-car sets

=== Line 6 ===
- CRRC Qingdao Sifang Type A 6-car sets

=== Line 7 ===
- CRRC Qingdao Sifang Type A 6-car sets

=== Line 8 ===
- CRRC Qingdao Sifang Type A trainsets

=== Line 10 ===
- CRRC Qingdao Sifang Type A 6-car sets

=== Line 12 ===
- CRRC Qingdao Sifang Type B 6-car sets

=== Line 14 ===
- Type B 6-car sets

=== Zhengxu Line ===
- Type B 4-car sets

== See also ==
- List of Metro systems
- Urban rail transit in China
