= New Campus of Henan University station =

Metro station in Zhengzhou, China

New Campus of Henan University 河南大学新区
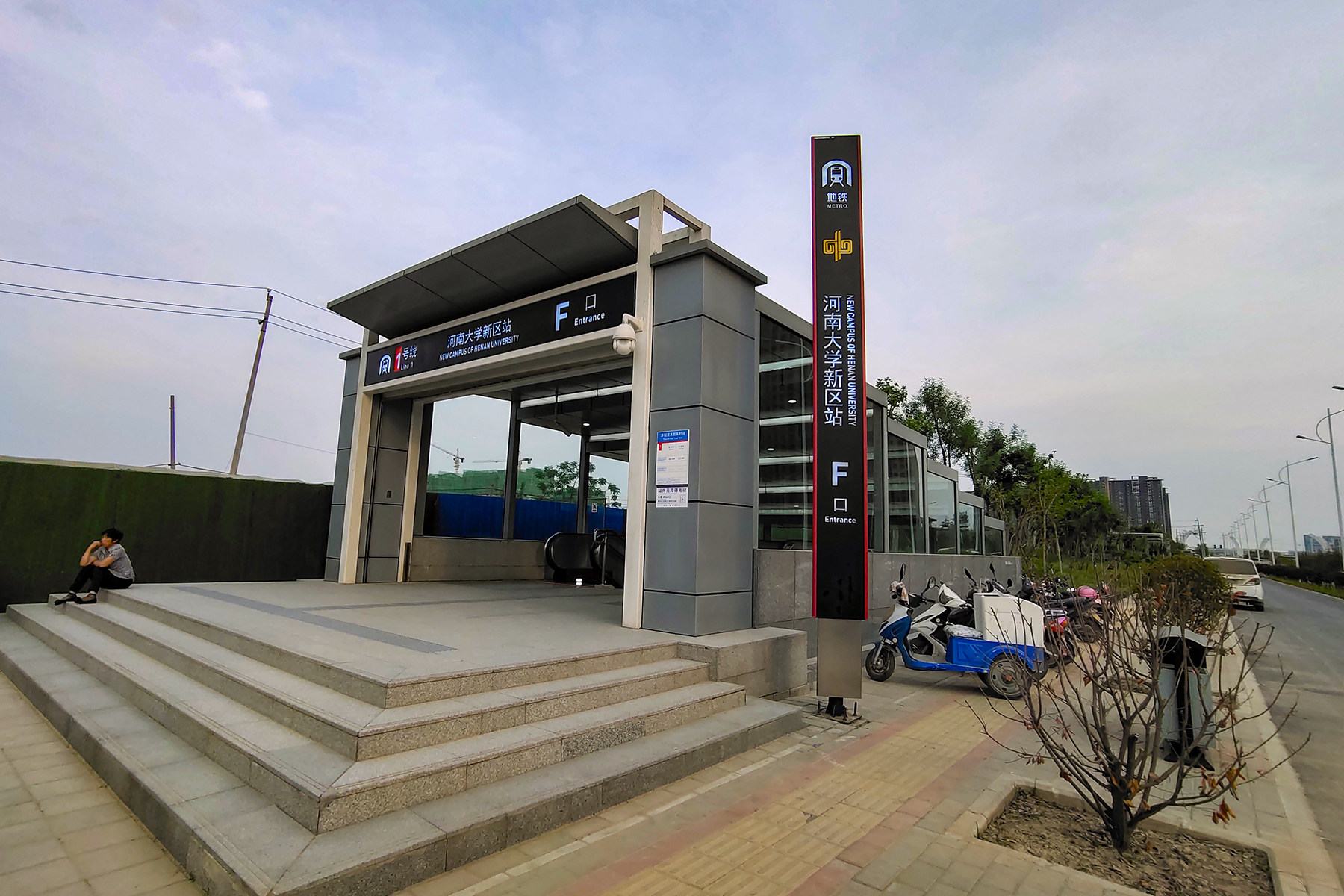

General information
- Location: Mingli Road, Zhengdong New Area, Zhengzhou; China
- System: Zhengzhou Metro rapid transit station
- Operator: Zhengzhou Metro
- Line: Line 1
- Platforms: 2 (1 island platform)

Construction
- Structure type: Underground

Other information
- Station code: 143

History
- Opened: 21 November 2019

Services
Preceding station	Zhengzhou Metro	Following station
Wenyuanbeilu towards Henan University of Technology	Line 1	Terminus
Location

New Campus of Henan University (Chinese: 河南大学新区) is the eastern terminus of Zhengzhou Metro Line 1. The station has opened on 21 November 2019.
