= List of skyscrapers by floor area =

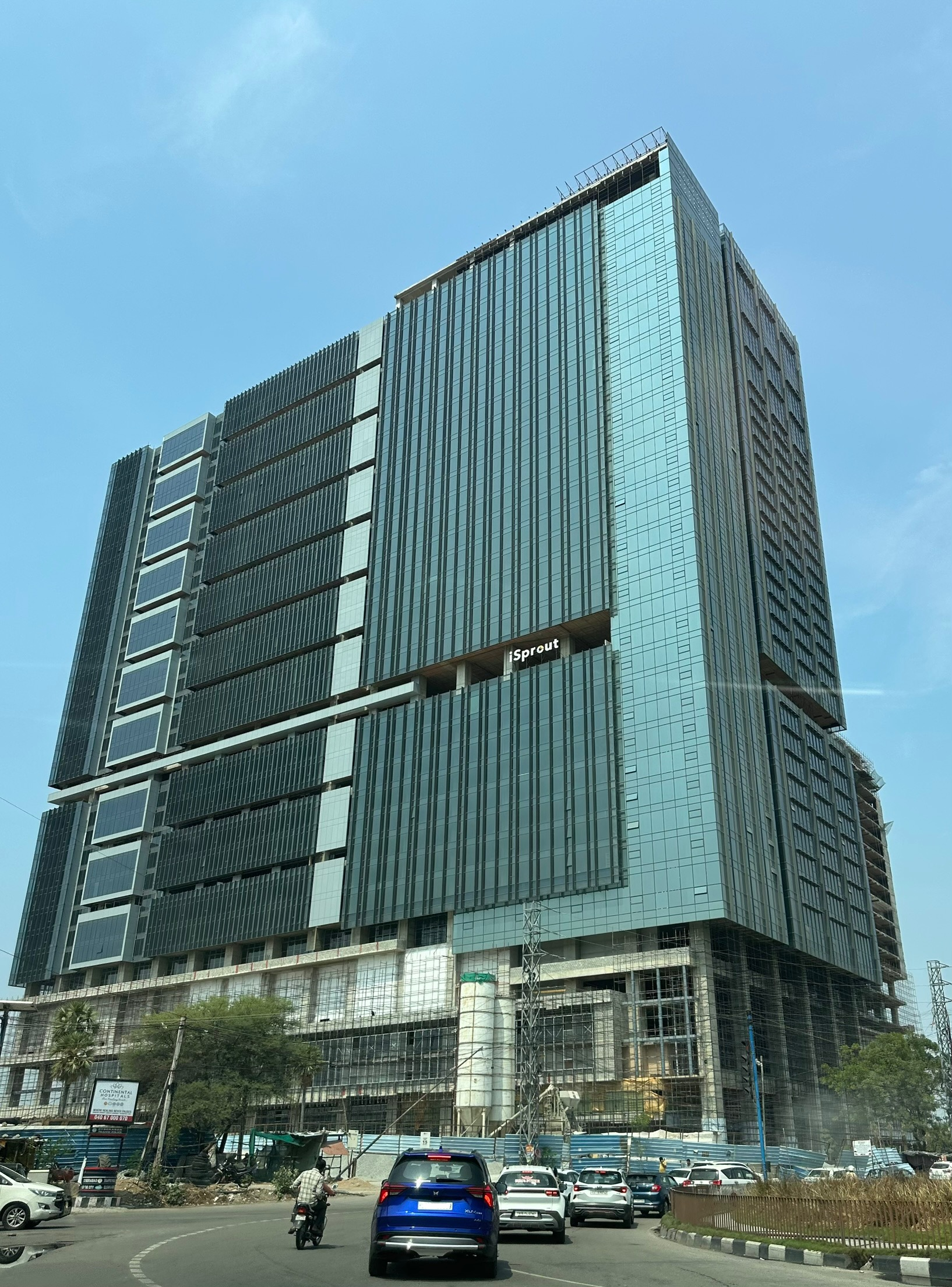
Tower A1 of SAS iTower, currently the world's largest skyscraper by floor area.

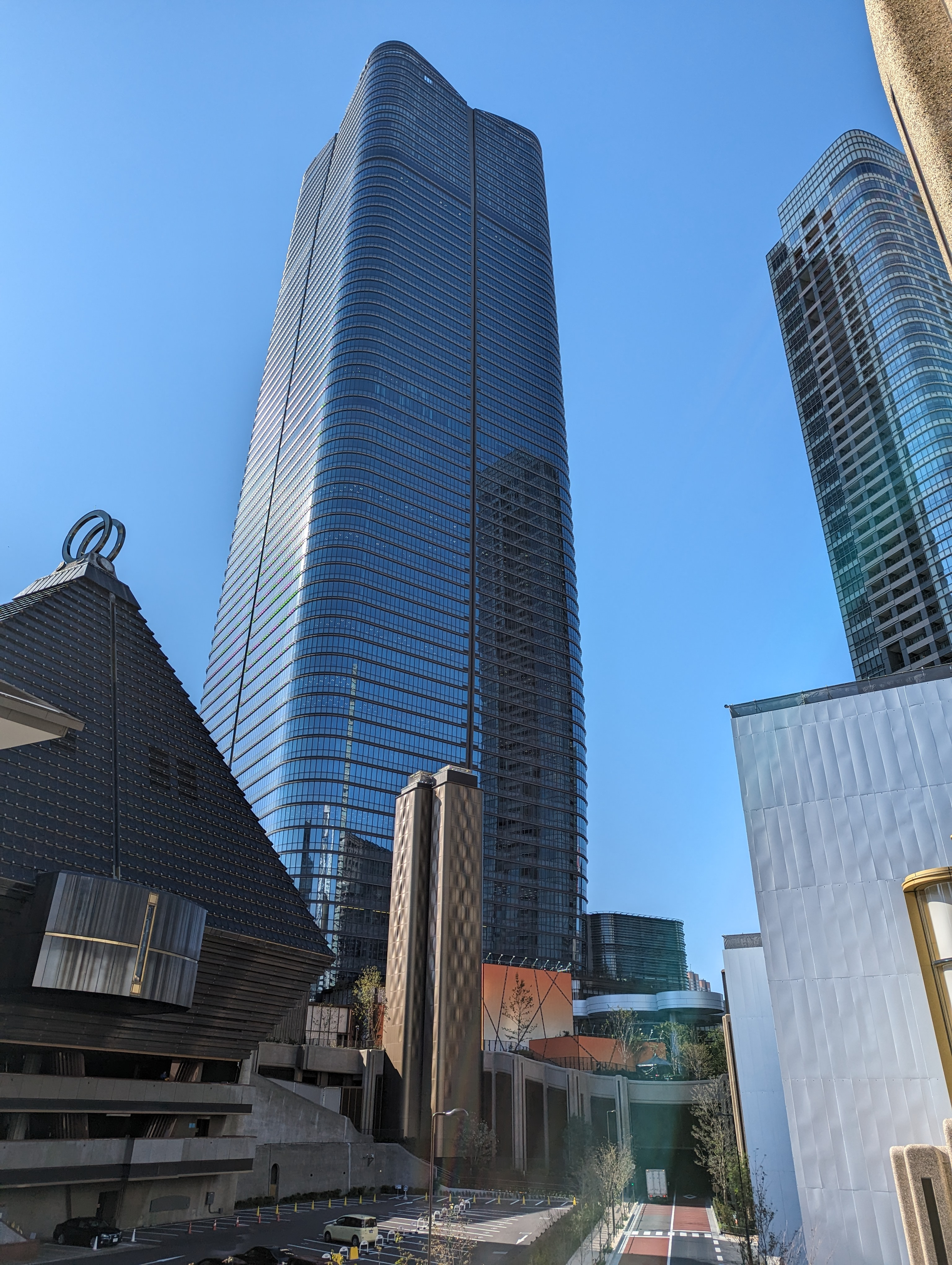
Azabudai Hills Mori JP Tower, currently the world's second-largest skyscraper by floor area.

This list of skyscrapers by floor area includes the largest skyscrapers in the world, measured in square meters (m^{2}) and square feet (sq ft). To qualify as a skyscraper, a structure must be self-supporting, without relying on tension cables or external supports for stability, and must reach a minimum height of 150 meters (492 feet). Furthermore, at least 50% of its height must consist of habitable floor space. Structures such as communication and observation towers—like Tokyo Skytree, the CN Tower, or the Eiffel Tower—are categorized as non-building structures and are therefore excluded from this article (see list of tallest buildings and structures).

As of 2026, the largest skyscraper by floor area is Tower A1 of SAS iTower in Hyderabad, India. Standing at 153.95 metres (505 ft) with 37 floors, it offers a total floor area of 484,586 m^{2} (5,216,040 sq ft).

== Largest skyscrapers in the world ==
This list ranks the largest skyscrapers in the world by floor area. To be included in the list, buildings must meet the definition of a skyscraper outlined above and have a floor area of approximately 200,000 m^{2} (2,200,000 sq ft) or more. The "Year" column indicates the year in which a building was completed. Buildings that are still under construction but have been topped out, as well as unfinished ones, are included. Unfinished buildings are unranked.

Indicates skyscrapers that are or were once the largest in the world by floor area
Indicates skyscrapers that are still under construction but have been topped out
Indicates unfinished skyscrapers whose estimated completion year is unknown
Indicates skyscrapers that are no longer standing

Rank	Name	Image	Floor area m^{2} (sq ft)	City	Country	Height m (ft)	Floors	Year	Notes
1	SAS iTower A1		484,586 (5,216,040)	Hyderabad	India	153.95 (505)	37	2025	Largest skyscraper in the world by floor area.
2	Azabudai Hills Mori JP Tower		461,774 (4,970,490)	Tokyo	Japan	325 (1,068)	64	2023	Second-largest skyscraper in the world by floor area
3	Ping An Finance Center		459,187 (4,942,650)	Shenzhen	China	599 (1,966)	118	2017	
4	Willis Tower		423,638 (4,560,000)	Chicago	United States	442 (1,450)	108	1974	Largest skyscraper in the Western Hemisphere; Largest skyscraper in the world after the WTC Twin Towers were destroyed
5	Shanghai Tower		420,000 (4,500,000)	Shanghai	China	632 (2,073)	128	2015	
na	One World Trade Center		400,000 (4,300,000)	New York City	United States	417 (1,368)	110	1972	Destroyed in 2001; Upon completion became the largest skyscraper(s) in the world until overtaken by the Willis Tower
na	Two World Trade Center		400,000 (4,300,000)	New York City	United States	415.1 (1,362)	110	1973	Destroyed in 2001; Upon completion became the largest skyscraper(s) in the world until overtaken by the Willis Tower
6	Guangzhou CTF Finance Centre		398,000 (4,280,000)	Guangzhou	China	530 (1,739)	111	2016	
7	The Exchange 106		385,168 (4,145,910)	Kuala Lumpur	Malaysia	445 (1,460)	95	2019	
8	Shanghai World Financial Center		381,600 (4,108,000)	Shanghai	China	492 (1,614)	101	2008	
9	Roppongi Hills Mori Tower		380,105 (4,091,420)	Tokyo	Japan	238 (781)	54	2003	
10	Midtown Nihonbashi 1-Chōme Central		374,004 (4,025,750)	Tokyo	Japan	284 (932)	52	2026	
11	Goldin Finance 117		370,000 (4,000,000)	Tianjin	China	597 (1,959)	128	2027	On April 25, 2025, it was announced that a new permit for construction was issued for P&T Group and BGI Engineering Consultants so that the project could be finished. Completion is set for 2027.
—	Ryugyong Hotel		360,032 (3,875,350)	Pyongyang	North Korea	330 (1,083)	105	—	
12	China Zun		350,000 (3,800,000)	Beijing	China	528 (1,732)	108	2018	
13	Wuhan Center		343,900 (3,702,000)	Wuhan	China	438 (1,437)	88	2019	
14	55 Water Street		341,913 (3,680,320)	New York City	United States	209 (687)	53	1972	Largest privately owned skyscraper in the world by floor area upon completion
15	Gate to the East		340,000 (3,700,000)	Suzhou	China	302 (990)	66	2015	
16	Aon Center		334,448 (3,599,970)	Chicago	United States	346 (1,136)	83	1973	
17	One World Trade Center		325,279 (3,501,270)	New York City	United States	541 (1,776)	94	2014	
18	Dalian International Trade Center		321,000 (3,460,000)	Dalian	China	370 (1,214)	86	2019	
19	CCTV Headquarters		316,000 (3,400,000)	Beijing	China	234 (768)	51	2012	
20	Grand Tower		315,282 (3,393,670)	Moscow	Russia	283 (928)	62	2024	
21	Abraj Al-Bait Clock Tower		310,638 (3,343,680)	Mecca	Saudi Arabia	601 (1,971)	120	2012	The Clock Tower is the centerpiece of a larger complex that connects several skyscrapers
22=	Palais Royale (Mumbai)		310,000 (3,300,000)	Mumbai	India	297.5 (976)	84	2026	
22=	Suzhou IFS		310,000 (3,300,000)	Suzhou	China	450 (1,476)	95	2019	
24	Burj Khalifa		309,473 (3,331,140)	Dubai	United Arab Emirates	828 (2,717)	163	2010	
25	Yokohama Landmark Tower		308,885 (3,324,810)	Yokohama	Japan	296 (972)	70	1993	
26	85 Sky Tower		306,337 (3,297,380)	Kaohsiung	Taiwan	348 (1,140)	85	1997	
27	Lotte World Tower		304,081 (3,273,100)	Seoul	South Korea	555 (1,819)	123	2016	
28	Wuhan Greenland Center		303,275 (3,264,420)	Wuhan	China	476 (1,560)	101	2022	
29=	Landmark 72		300,000 (3,200,000)	Hanoi	Vietnam	329 (1,078)	72	2012	
29=	Changsha IFS Tower T1		300,000 (3,200,000)	Changsha	China	452 (1,483)	88	2018	
29=	CBRT Tower		300,000 (3,200,000)	Istanbul	Turkey	354 (1,161)	62	2024	
32	Merdeka 118		292,000 (3,140,000)	Kuala Lumpur	Malaysia	679 (2,227)	118	2022	
33	Tianjin CTF Finance Centre		291,610 (3,138,900)	Tianjin	China	530 (1,739)	98	2019	
34	Xi'an Glory International Financial Center		289,978 (3,121,300)	Xi'an	China	350 (1,148)	75	2022	
35	Jin Mao Tower		289,500 (3,116,000)	Shanghai	China	421 (1,380)	88	1999	
36	Imperia Tower		287,724 (3,097,040)	Moscow	Russia	239 (783)	61	2011	
37	Tokyo Midtown Yaesu Yaesu Central Tower		283,896 (3,055,830)	Tokyo	Japan	240 (787)	45	2022	
38=	Shun Hing Square		280,000 (3,000,000)	Shenzhen	China	384 (1,260)	69	1996	
38=	China World Tower		280,000 (3,000,000)	Beijing	China	330 (1,083)	74	2010	
40	International Commerce Centre		274,064 (2,950,000)	Hong Kong	China	484 (1,588)	108	2010	
41	Guangxi China Resources Tower		272,255 (2,930,530)	Nanning	China	403 (1,321)	85	2020	
42	50 Hudson Yards		269,000 (2,900,000)	New York City	United States	299 (981)	58	2022	
43	China Resources Headquarters		268,713 (2,892,400)	Shenzhen	China	393 (1,288)	67	2017	
44	Blue Front Shibaura Tower S		268,167 (2,886,530)	Tokyo	Japan	229 (751)	43	2025	The complex will include the 227 m (746 ft) N Tower and will have a total floor area of 550,209 m^{2} (5,922,400 sq ft)
45	JR Gate Tower		265,576 (2,858,640)	Nagoya	Japan	211 (693)	46	2017	
46	The Spiral		264,774 (2,850,000)	New York City	United States	314 (1,031)	66	2022	
47	Shinjuku Park Tower		264,141 (2,843,190)	Tokyo	Japan	235 (771)	52	1994	
48	Golden Eagle Tiandi Tower A		263,992 (2,841,590)	Nanjing	China	368 (1,208)	76	2019	
49	MetLife Building		263,985 (2,841,510)	New York City	United States	246 (808)	59	1963	
50	3 World Trade Center		260,129 (2,800,010)	New York City	United States	329 (1,079)	69	2018	
51	John Hancock Center		260,126 (2,799,970)	Chicago	United States	344 (1,128)	100	1969	
52	First Canadian Place		250,849 (2,700,120)	Toronto	Canada	298 (978)	72	1975	
53	Guangzhou International Finance Center		250,095 (2,692,000)	Guangzhou	China	439 (1,439)	103	2010	
54	Landmark 81		249,000 (2,680,000)	Ho Chi Minh City	Vietnam	461 (1,513)	81	2018	
55	International Land-Sea Center		248,470 (2,674,500)	Chongqing	China	458 (1,503)	98	2025	Topped out: construction is expected to last until 2025
56	225 Liberty Street		247,793 (2,667,220)	New York City	United States	197 (645)	44	1986	
57	Midtown Tower		246,408 (2,652,310)	Tokyo	Japan	248 (814)	54	2007	
58	Toranomon Hills Mori Tower		244,360 (2,630,300)	Tokyo	Japan	256 (838)	52	2014	
59	Tokyo Opera City Tower		242,261 (2,607,680)	Tokyo	Japan	234 (769)	54	1996	
60=	Trump International Hotel and Tower (Chicago)		241,548 (2,600,000)	Chicago	United States	423 (1,389)	98	2009	
60=	30 Hudson Yards		241,548 (2,600,000)	New York City	United States	387 (1,270)	73	2019	
62	Iconic Tower		241,000 (2,590,000)	New Administrative Capital	Egypt	394 (1,292)	77	2024	
63	One Penn Plaza		240,296 (2,586,520)	New York City	United States	229 (750)	57	1972	
64	Zhengzhou Greenland Plaza		240,169 (2,585,160)	Zhengzhou	China	280 (919)	56	2014	
65	Toranomon Hills Station Tower		236,640 (2,547,200)	Tokyo	Japan	266 (872)	49	2023	
66	4 World Trade Center		232,258 (2,500,000)	New York City	United States	298 (977)	72	2014	
67=	Greenland Zhengzhou Central Plaza North Tower		232,000 (2,500,000)	Zhengzhou	China	284 (931)	63	2017	
67=	Greenland Zhengzhou Central Plaza South Tower		232,000 (2,500,000)	Zhengzhou	China	284 (931)	63	2017	
69	Ping An Finance Center Tower 1		226,280 (2,435,700)	Jinan	China	360 (1,181)	63	2023	
70	China World Tower B		225,806 (2,430,560)	Beijing	China	296 (970)	59	2017	
71	270 Park Avenue		224,882 (2,420,610)	New York City	United States	423 (1,388)	60	2025	Topped out: construction is expected to last until 2025
72	Parc1 Tower 1		223,340 (2,404,000)	Seoul	South Korea	333 (1,093)	69	2020	
73	KK100		220,000 (2,400,000)	Shenzhen	China	442 (1,449)	98	2011	
74	Sanno Park Tower		219,215 (2,359,610)	Tokyo	Japan	194 (638)	44	2000	
75	Paramount Plaza		219,172 (2,359,150)	New York City	United States	204 (670)	48	1970	
76	Guangxi Finance Plaza		219,000 (2,360,000)	Nanning	China	321 (1,053)	68	2017	
77	Blue Cross Blue Shield Tower		217,756 (2,343,910)	Chicago	United States	227 (744)	54	2010	
78	U.S. Steel Tower		217,045 (2,336,250)	Pittsburgh	United States	256 (841)	64	1970	
79	Greenland Group Suzhou Center		216,628 (2,331,760)	Suzhou	China	358 (1,175)	77	2025	
80	Shinjuku I-Land Tower		216,160 (2,326,700)	Tokyo	Japan	189 (621)	44	1995	
81	OCT Tower		215,973 (2,324,710)	Shenzhen	China	300 (984)	60	2020	
82	Minying International Trade Center T1		215,000 (2,310,000)	Dongguan	China	423 (1,386)	85	2021	
83	Cœur Défense		214,698 (2,310,990)	Courbevoie	France	161 (528)	40	2001	
84	Dentsu HQ Building		213,949 (2,302,930)	Tokyo	Japan	213 (700)	48	2002	
85	28 Liberty Street (One Chase Manhattan Plaza)		213,675 (2,299,980)	New York City	United States	248 (813)	60	1961	
86	Eurasia		212,900 (2,292,000)	Moscow	Russia	309 (1,013)	72	2015	
87	Jiuzhou International Tower		212,587 (2,288,270)	Nanning	China	318 (1,043)	71	2017	
88	Abeno Harukas		212,208 (2,284,190)	Osaka	Japan	300 (984)	60	2014	
89	Pearl River Tower		212,165 (2,283,730)	Guangzhou	China	310 (1,016)	71	2012	
90	JP Tower		212,043 (2,282,410)	Tokyo	Japan	200 (656)	38	2012	
91	Fortune Center		210,477 (2,265,560)	Guangzhou	China	309 (1,015)	68	2015	
92	Longxi International Hotel		210,000 (2,300,000)	Wuxi	China	328 (1,076)	72	2011	
93	Tokyo World Gate Akasaka Trust Tower		209,689 (2,257,070)	Tokyo	Japan	209 (686)	43	2024	
94	Empire State Building		208,879 (2,248,350)	New York City	United States	381 (1,250)	102	1931	
95	Shenzhen CFC Changfu Centre		206,392 (2,221,580)	Shenzhen	China	304 (998)	68	2015	
96	CITIC Plaza		205,239 (2,209,170)	Guangzhou	China	390 (1,280)	80	1996	
97	One Liberty Plaza		204,387 (2,200,000)	New York City	United States	226 (743)	54	1972	
98=	Chase Tower (Chicago)		204,385 (2,199,980)	Chicago	United States	259 (850)	60	1969	
98=	1221 Avenue of the Americas		204,385 (2,199,980)	New York City	United States	205 (674)	51	1972	
100	Tianjin World Financial Center		203,953 (2,195,330)	Tianjin	China	337 (1,105)	75	2011	
101	Forum 66 Tower 1		203,154 (2,186,730)	Shenyang	China	351 (1,150)	68	2015	
102	22 Bishopsgate		201,970 (2,174,000)	London	United Kingdom	278 (913)	62	2020	

== Largest complexes ==
This section lists the world's largest skyscraper complexes by floor area. A skyscraper complex may consist of multiple skyscrapers, as well as other buildings or facilities, that are either physically connected to each other or part of the same development project.

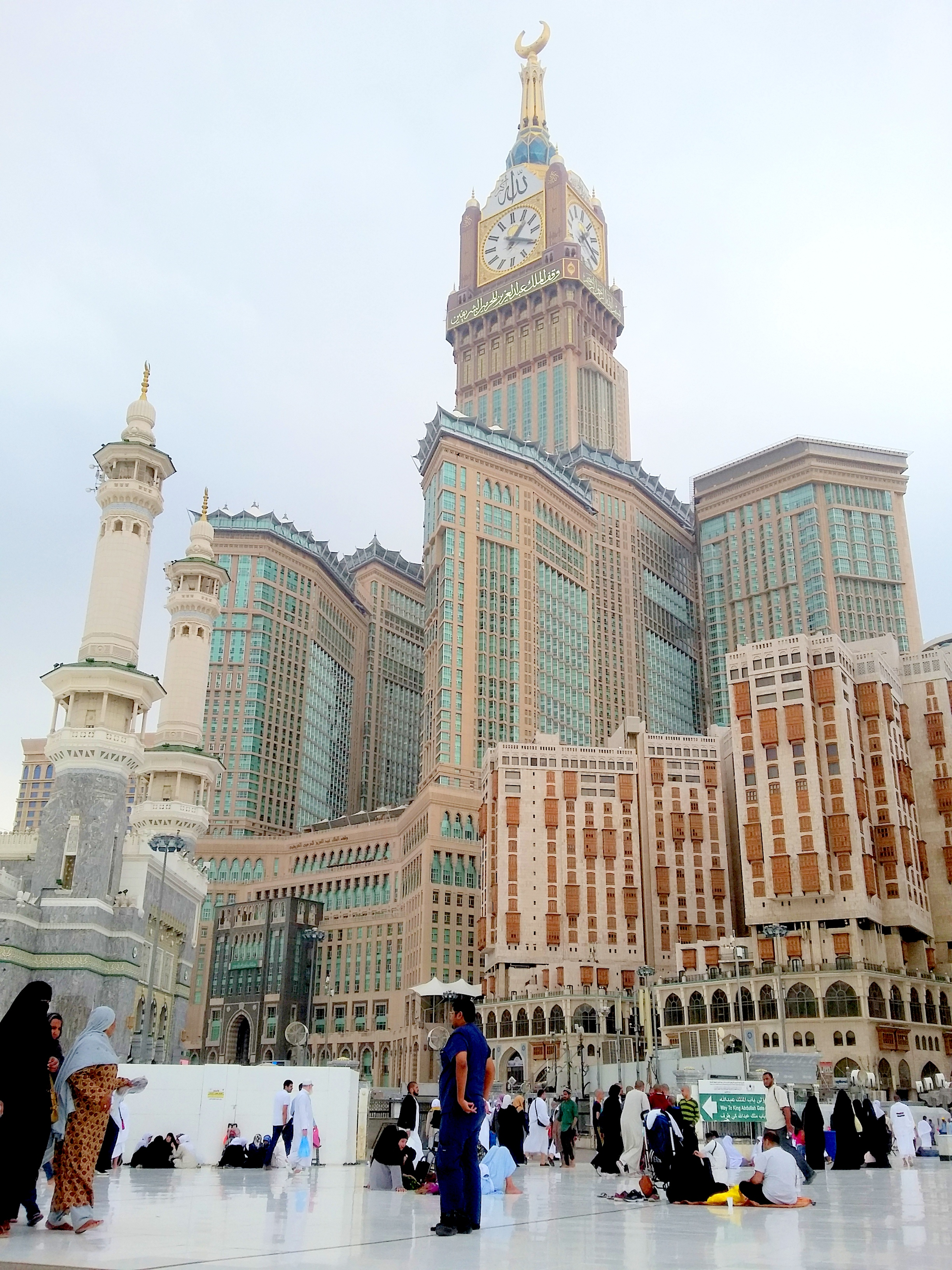
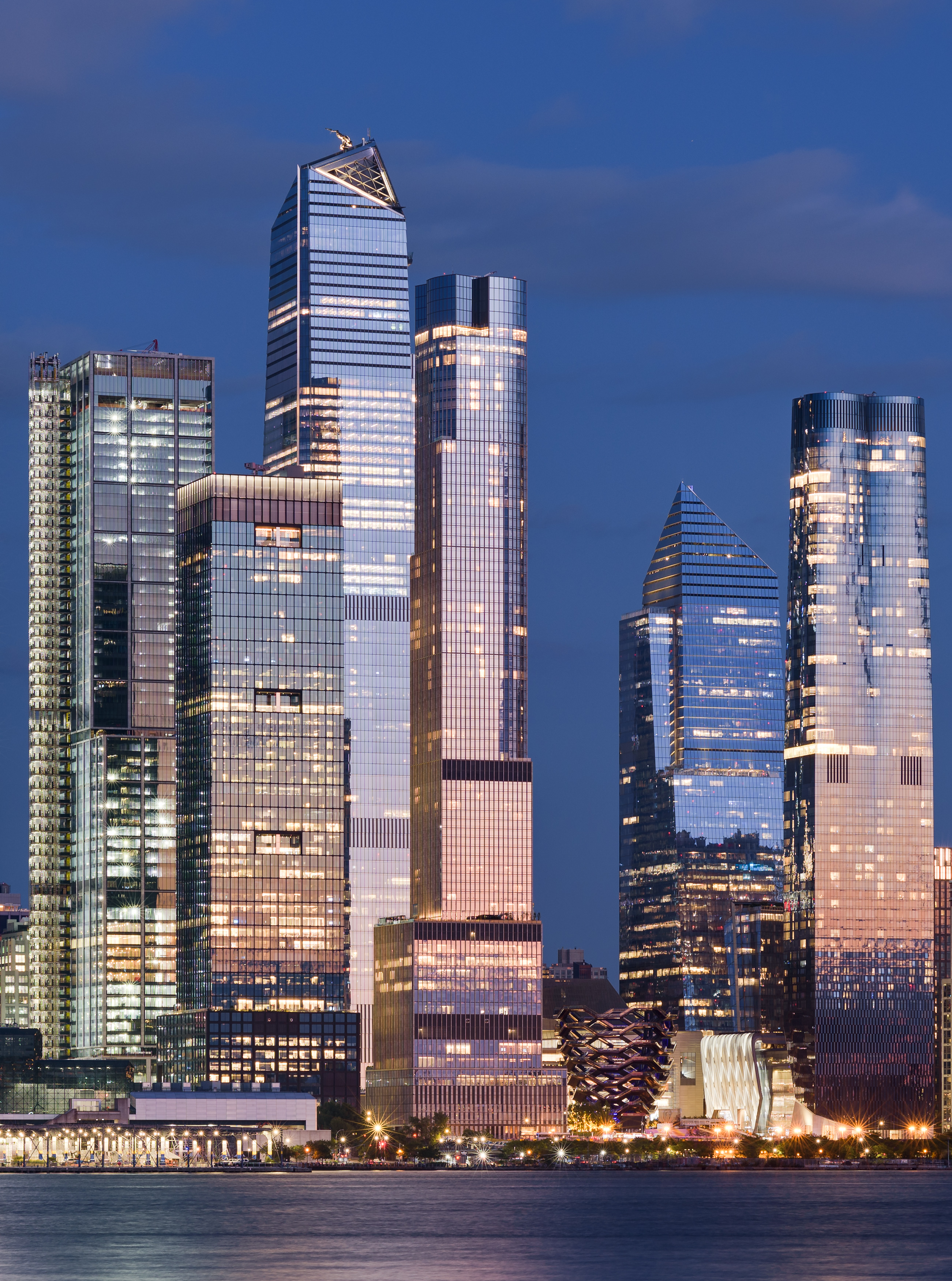
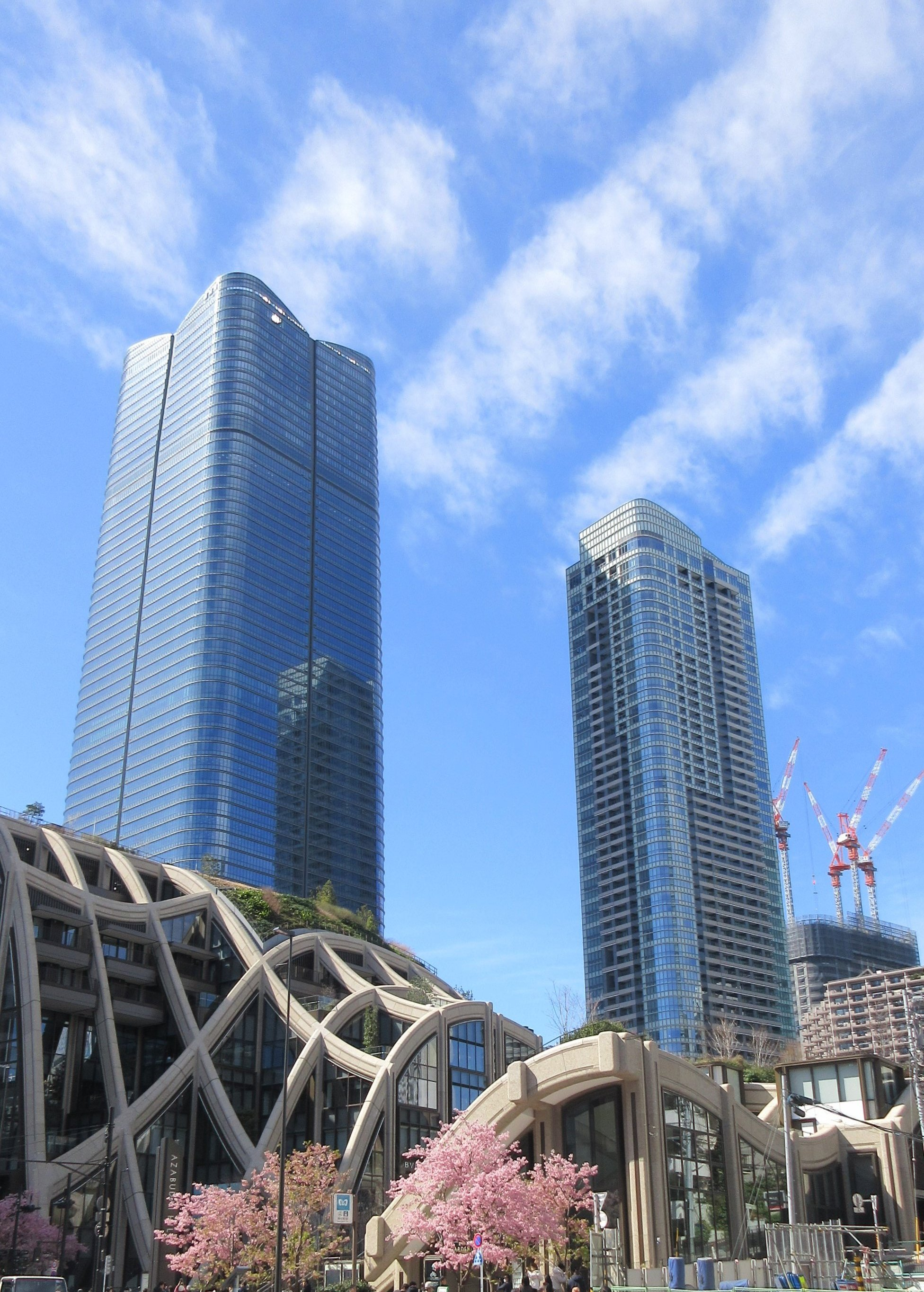
The Abraj Al-Bait, Hudson Yards, and Azabudai Hills complexes are among the largest skyscraper complexes in the world by floor area.

To qualify for these lists, skyscrapers must be constructed close to each other and be part of a single complex. Significant height differences between the buildings are allowed as long as they belong to the same project. Buildings may or may not be connected via a podium or skybridges. Non-skyscraper buildings or structures can be part of the complex, and their floor area may be included in the total calculation. Single-skyscraper complexes typically include a skyscraper integrated with a shopping mall or other facilities.

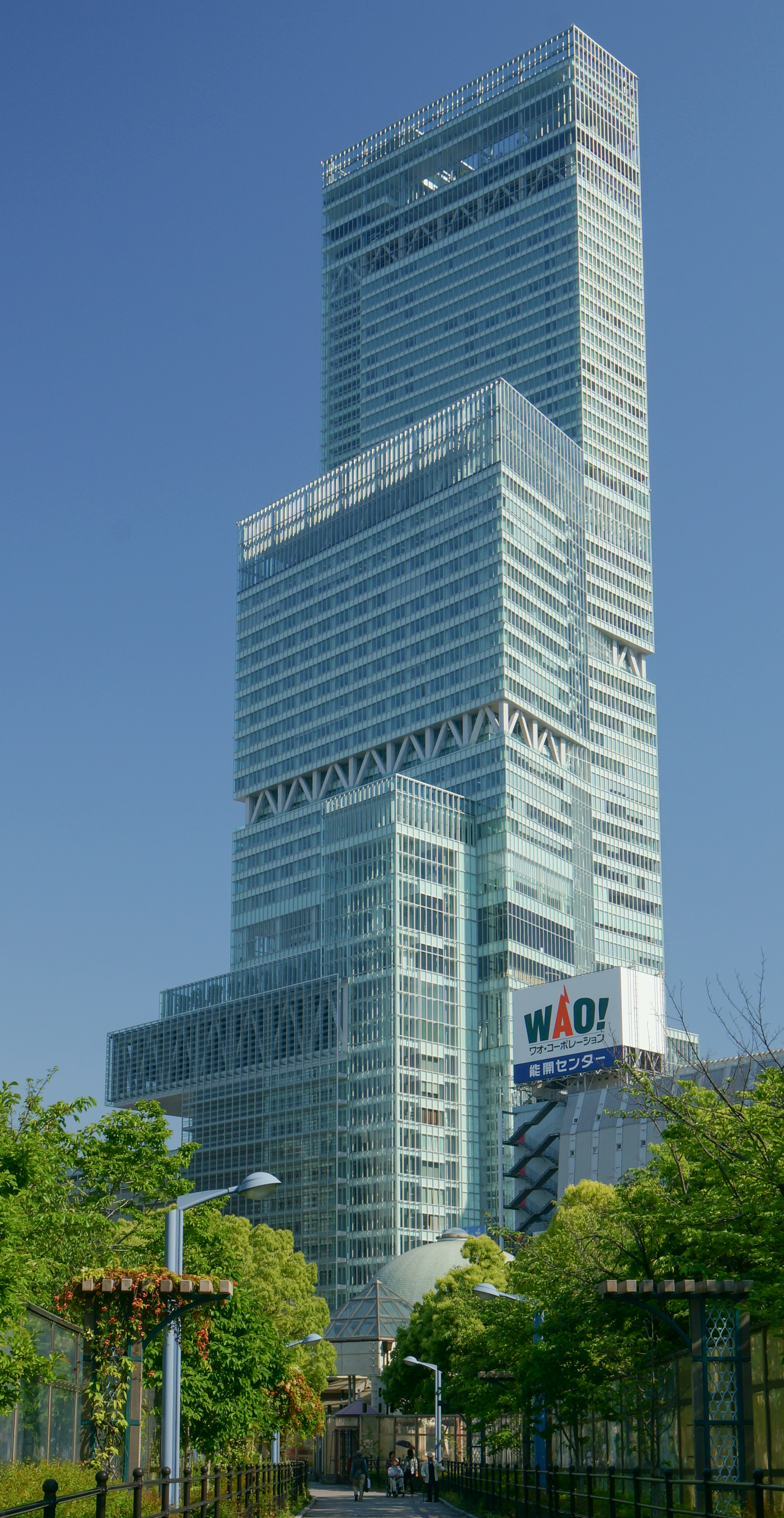
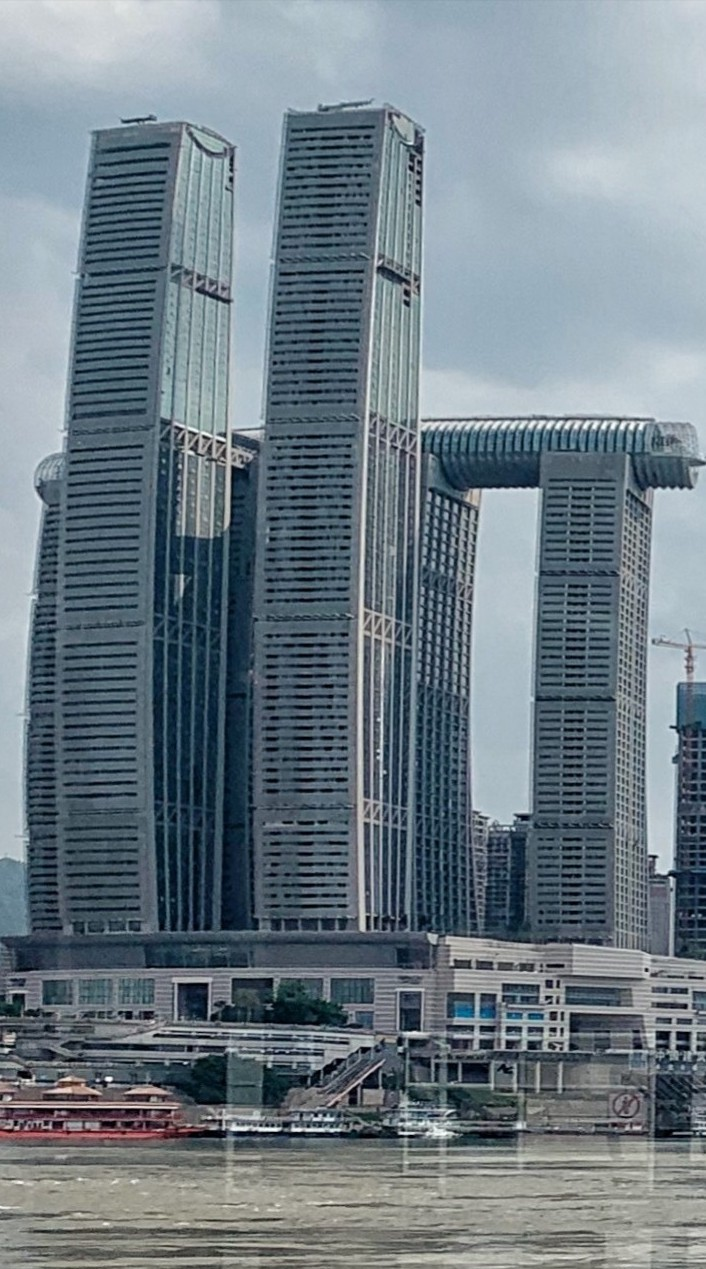
Abeno Harukas (1 skyscraper), Haeundae LCT The Sharp (3 skyscrapers), and Raffles City Chongqing (8 skyscrapers).

The lists below are categorized based on the number of skyscrapers within a complex.

=== One skyscraper ===
This list includes complexes that feature only one skyscraper, providing an alternative measurement for some skyscrapers already listed in the Largest skyscrapers in the world section above. To be included, these complexes must have a total floor area of approximately 200,000 m^{2} (2,200,000 sq ft) or more.

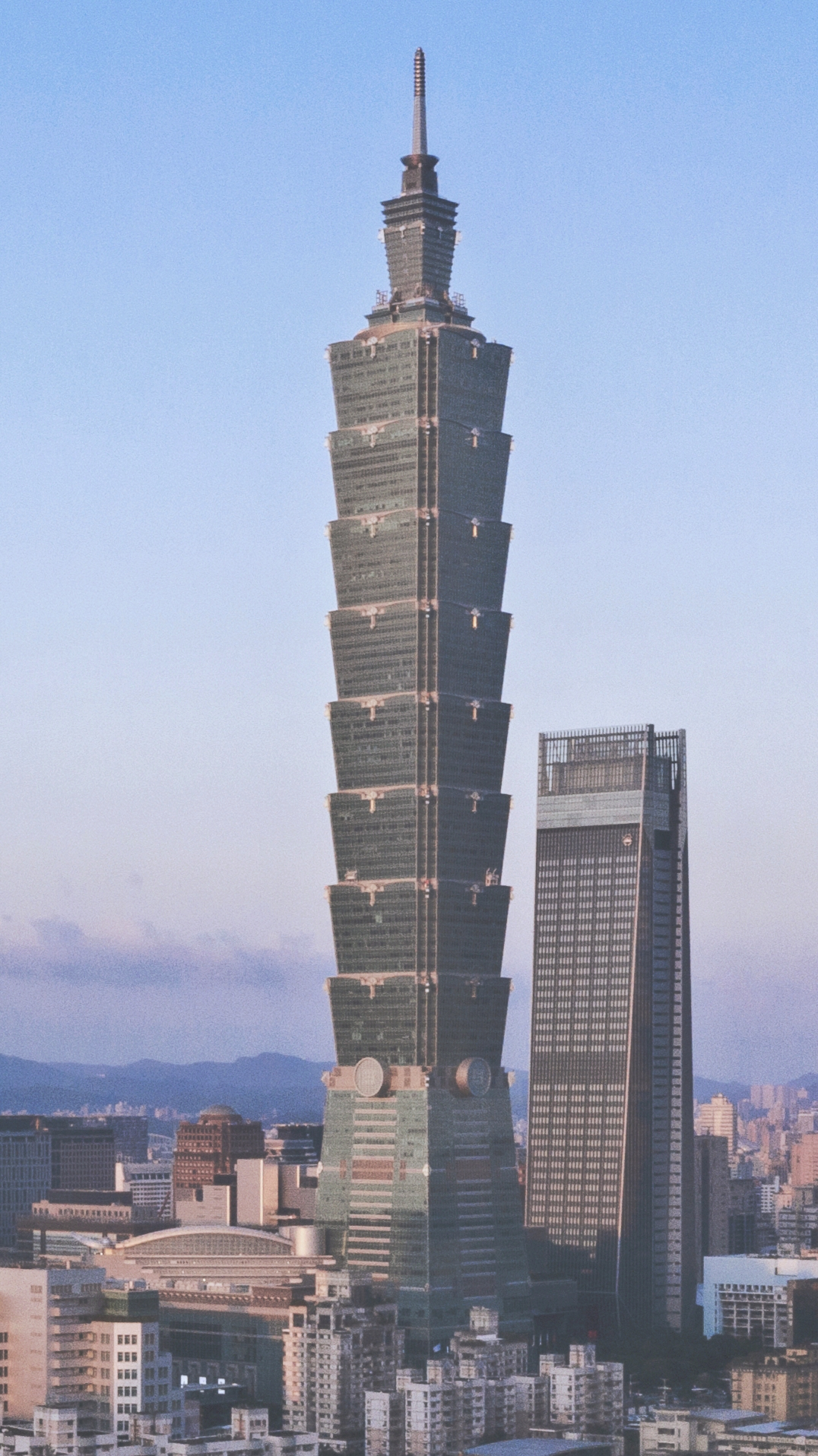
Taipei 101 is a famous example of a single-skyscraper complex. It includes other facilities, like a shopping center.

Indicates skyscrapers that are still under construction but have been topped out

Name	Floor area m^{2} (sq ft)	City	Country	Height m (ft)	Year	Notes
Lotte World Tower & World Mall	805,872 (8,674,330)	Seoul	South Korea	555 (1,819)	2016	This complex includes the Lotte World Mall
Merdeka 118	673,862 (7,253,390)	Kuala Lumpur	Malaysia	679 (2,227)	2023	
Shanghai Tower	578,000 (6,220,000)	Shanghai	China	632 (2,073)	2015	
Abu Dhabi Plaza	550,000 (5,900,000)	Astana	Kazakhstan	311 (1,020)	2021	Buildings shorter than 150 m (492 ft) are included
Guangzhou CTF Finance Centre	507,681 (5,464,630)	Guangzhou	China	530 (1,739)	2016	
CCTV Headquarters	473,000 (5,090,000)	Beijing	China	234 (768)	2012	
The Exchange 106	453,835 (4,885,040)	Kuala Lumpur	Malaysia	445 (1,460)	2019	
Guangzhou International Finance Center	448,371 (4,826,230)	Guangzhou	China	440 (1,440)	2010	
China Zun	437,000 (4,700,000)	Beijing	China	528 (1,732)	2018	
Taipei 101	412,500 (4,440,000)	Taipei	Taiwan	508 (1,667)	2004	Skyscraper's floor area: 198,347 m^{2} (2,134,990 sq ft)
Yokohama Landmark Tower	392,885 (4,228,980)	Yokohama	Japan	296 (972)	1993	
Tianjin CTF Finance Centre	389,980 (4,197,700)	Tianjin	China	530 (1,739)	2019	
Suzhou IFS	382,462 (4,116,790)	Suzhou	China	450 (1,476)	2019	
30 Hudson Yards	361,993 (3,896,460)	New York City	USA	387 (1,270)	2019	
Osaka Umeda Twin Towers North Complex	329,635 (3,548,160)	Osaka	Japan	187 (613)	2012	Skyscraper's floor area (including the part of the podium directly below the offices): 253,955 m^{2} (2,733,550 sq ft); Skyscraper's floor area (offices only; from the 14th floor to the top): 102,000 m^{2} (1,100,000 sq ft)
Greenland Group Suzhou Center	310,000 (3,300,000)	Suzhou	China	358 (1,175)	2025	
Abeno Harukas	305,901 (3,292,690)	Osaka	Japan	300 (984)	2014	
Forum 66	293,524 (3,159,470)	Shenyang	China	351 (1,150)	2015	
Al Hamra Tower	290,000 (3,100,000)	Kuwait City	Kuwait	413 (1,354)	2011	Skyscraper's floor area: 178,061 m^{2} (1,916,630 sq ft)

=== Two skyscrapers ===
This list only includes complexes that feature two skyscrapers. Other facilities may or may not be included. Twin buildings, commonly referred to as twin towers, are included. These complexes must have a total floor area of approximately 200,000 m^{2} (2,200,000 sq ft) or more. The "Year" column refers to the completion year of the most recently finished building in the complex.

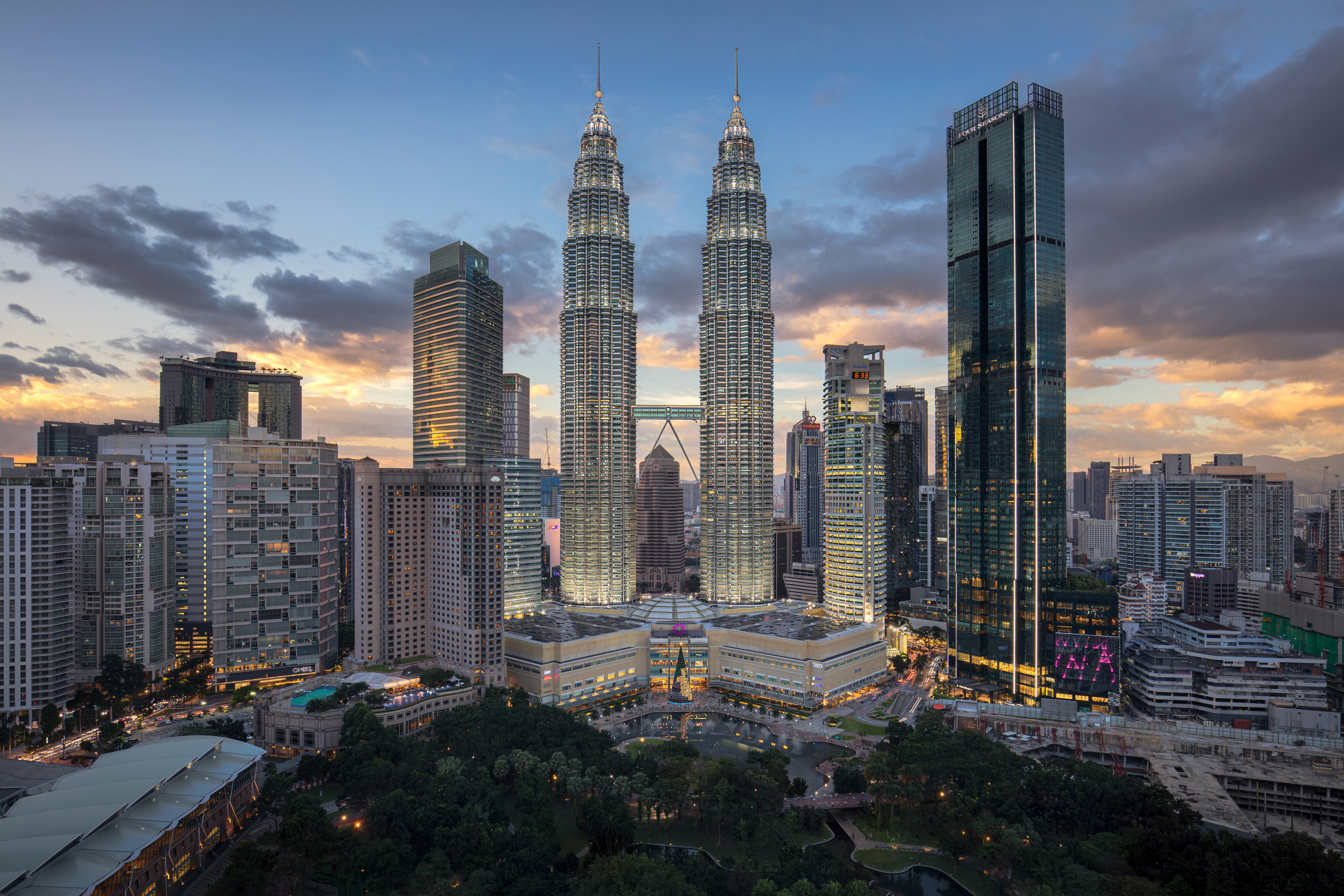
The Petronas Towers are one of the most famous examples of twin skyscrapers. This complex is part of a larger one that includes a third skyscraper.

Indicates twin skyscrapers, having the same or nearly the same height and identical characteristics/designs
Indicates skyscrapers that are still under construction but have been topped out

Name	Floor area m^{2} (sq ft)	City	Country	Height m (ft)Tower 1	Height m (ft)Tower 2	Year	Notes
Huaguoyuan Towers	851,895 (9,169,720)	Guiyang	China	335 (1,099)	335 (1,099)	2020	
Iconsiam	750,000 (8,100,000)	Bangkok	Thailand	316 (1,037)	272 (893)	2019	
Berjaya Times Square	695,995 (7,491,630)	Kuala Lumpur	Malaysia	203 (666)	203 (666)	2003	The complex includes the 203 m (666 ft) Towers A and B, both connected to a shopping mall
One Za'abeel	530,700 (5,712,000)	Dubai	UAE	301 (989)	238 (782)	2023	
Osaka Umeda Twin Towers	512,812 (5,519,860)	Osaka	Japan	189 (620)	187 (613)	2022	
Thamrin Nine	470,000 (5,100,000)	Jakarta	Indonesia	383 (1,256)	301 (988)	2023	Autograph Tower: 186,000 m^{2} (2,000,000 sq ft)
Zhengzhou Greenland Central Plaza	464,000 (4,990,000)	Zhengzhou	China	284 (931)	284 (931)	2017	
Federation Tower	439,154 (4,727,010)	Moscow	Russia	374 (1,226)	243 (796)	2016	
Spring City 66 (Hang Lung Plaza)	432,000 (4,650,000)	Kunming	China	349 (1,145)	251 (823)	2023	Tower 1: 167,631 m^{2} (1,804,370 sq ft); Tower 2: approx. 100,000 m^{2} (1,100,000 sq ft); Shopping Mall: approx. 160,000 m^{2} (1,700,000 sq ft)
JR Central Towers	416,565 (4,483,870)	Nagoya	Japan	245 (804)	226 (741)	1999	
Sumou Towers	415,000 (4,470,000)	Jeddah	Saudi Arabia	310 (1,017)	290 (951)	2026	
Petronas Towers	395,000 (4,250,000)	Kuala Lumpur	Malaysia	452 (1,483)	452 (1,483)	1998	
The Tokyo Towers	383,345 (4,126,290)	Tokyo	Japan	192 (631)	192 (631)	2008	
Tokyo Metropolitan Government Complex	380,504 (4,095,710)	Tokyo	Japan	243 (799)	163 (536)	1991	Building No. 1: 196,755 m^{2} (2,117,850 sq ft); Building No. 2: 139,950 m^{2} (1,506,400 sq ft)
Otemachi One	357,700 (3,850,000)	Tokyo	Japan	200 (656)	158 (518)	2020	
Azabudai Hills Residences A & B	354,300 (3,814,000)	Tokyo	Japan	263 (862)	237 (778)	2025	
Dalian Futures Square	353,000 (3,800,000)	Dalian	China	243 (797)	243 (797)	2010	
Neva Towers	349,232 (3,759,100)	Moscow	Russia	345 (1,132)	297 (974)	2020	
Greenland Hangzhou Center	344,907 (3,712,550)	Hangzhou	China	304 (996)	303 (995)	2023	
JW Marriott Marquis Dubai	320,314 (3,447,830)	Dubai	UAE	355 (1,166)	355 (1,166)	2013	
Grand Gateway 66	315,118 (3,391,900)	Shanghai	China	262 (859)	262 (859)	2005	
Jeju Dream Towers	303,737 (3,269,400)	Jeju	South Korea	169 (554)	169 (554)	2020	
Lusail Plaza Towers 3 & 4	300,000 (3,200,000)	Lusail	Qatar	301 (986)	301 (986)	2023	
Nakanoshima Festival Towers	296,748 (3,194,170)	Osaka	Japan	200 (654)	200 (654)	2017	
City of Capitals	288,680 (3,107,300)	Moscow	Russia	302 (990)	257 (844)	2010	
Brookfield Place (Toronto)	276,110 (2,972,000)	Toronto	Canada	263 (863)	208 (682)	1992	Bay Wellington: 148,640 m^{2} (1,599,900 sq ft); TD Trust Tower: 127,470 m^{2} (1,372,100 sq ft)
OKO	264,000 (2,840,000)	Moscow	Russia	354 (1,160)	224 (736)	2015	
Deutsche Bank Center	260,129 (2,800,010)	New York City	USA	228 (749)	228 (749)	2004	
Palm Towers Doha	260,000 (2,800,000)	Doha	Qatar	244 (802)	244 (802)	2011	
One Shangri-La Place	256,438 (2,760,280)	Mandaluyong	Philippines	222 (729)	222 (729)	2014	
Lippo Centre (Hong Kong)	241,548 (2,600,000)	Hong Kong	China	186 (610)	186 (610)	1988	
The Imperial (Mumbai)	240,000 (2,600,000)	Mumbai	India	256 (840)	256 (840)	2010	
Jordan Gate	220,000 (2,400,000)	Amman	Jordan	180 (591)	165 (541)	2024	
Century Plaza Towers	210,000 (2,300,000)	Los Angeles	USA	174 (571)	174 (571)	1975	
City National Plaza	206,052 (2,217,930)	Los Angeles	USA	213 (699)	213 (699)	1971	
Al Kazim Towers	204,042 (2,196,290)	Dubai	UAE	265 (869)	265 (869)	2008	
Riviera TwinStar Square	200,000 (2,200,000)	Shanghai	China	216 (708)	216 (708)	2011	

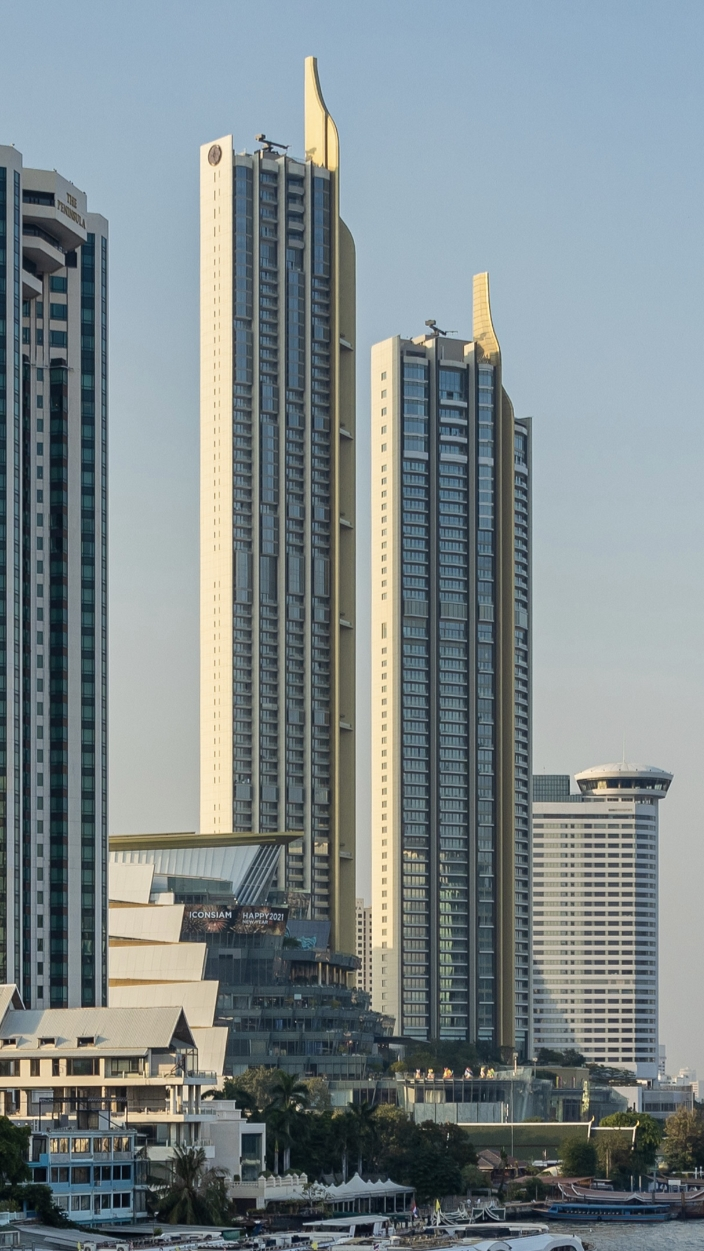
ICONSIAM

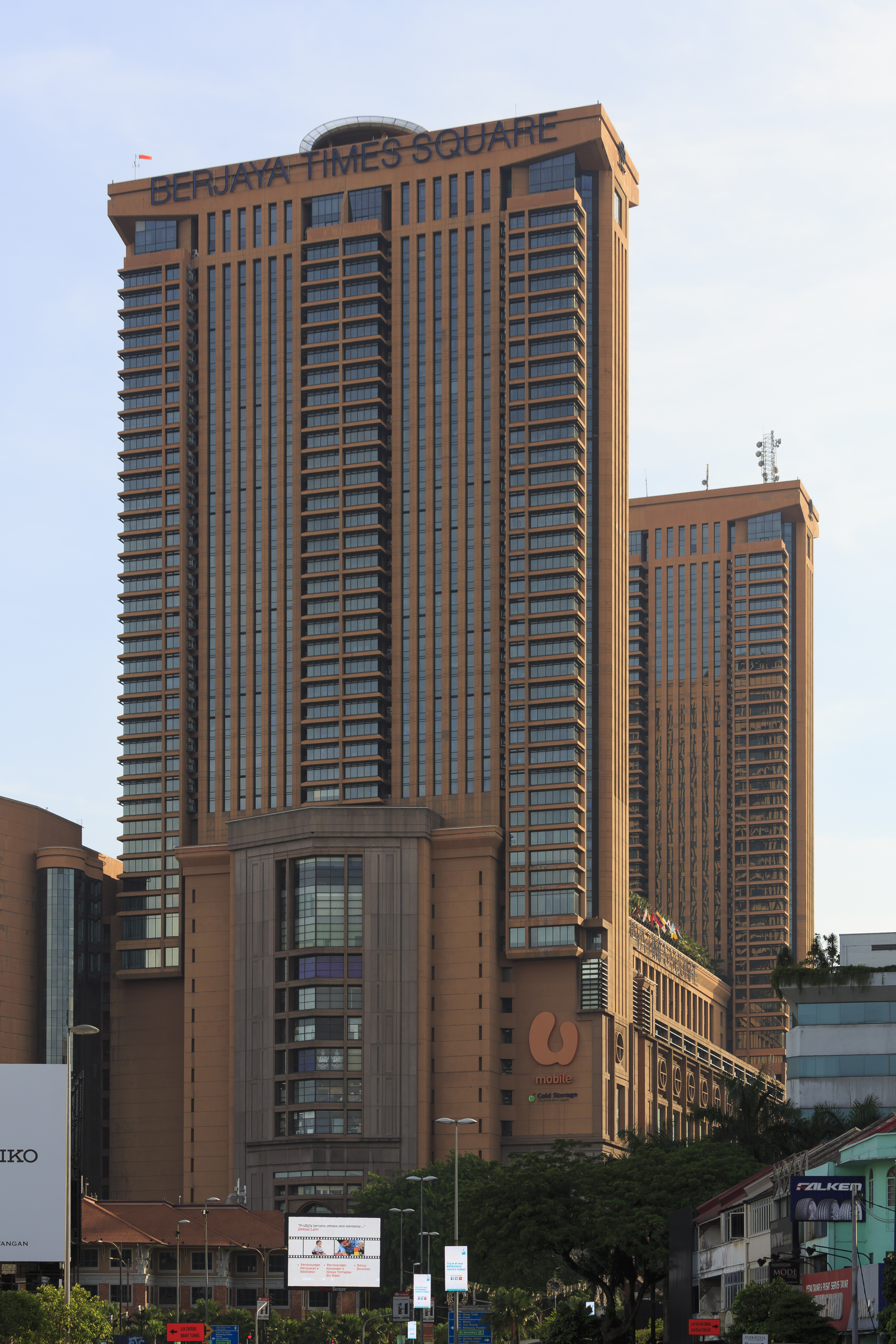
Berjaya Times Square

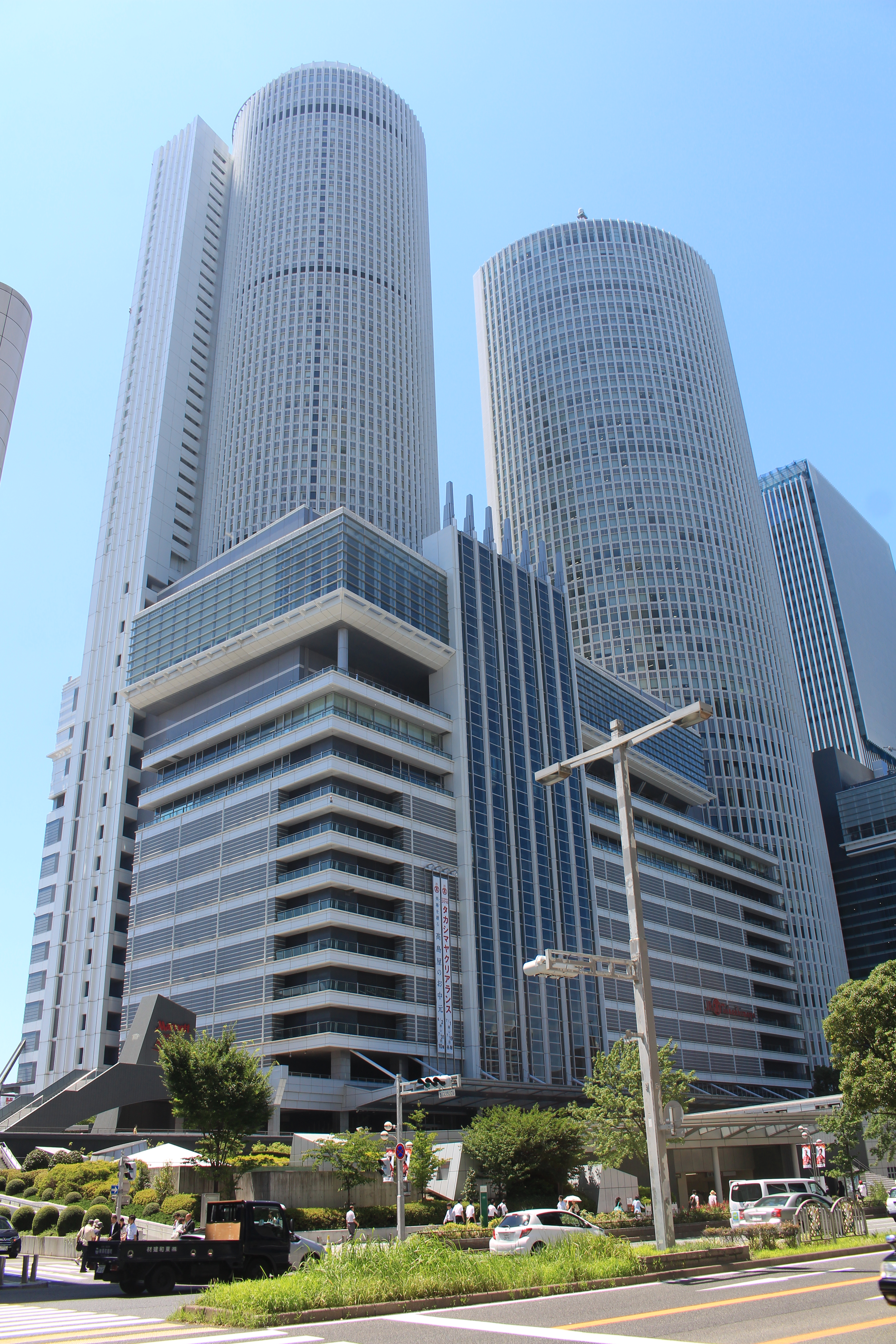
JR Central Towers

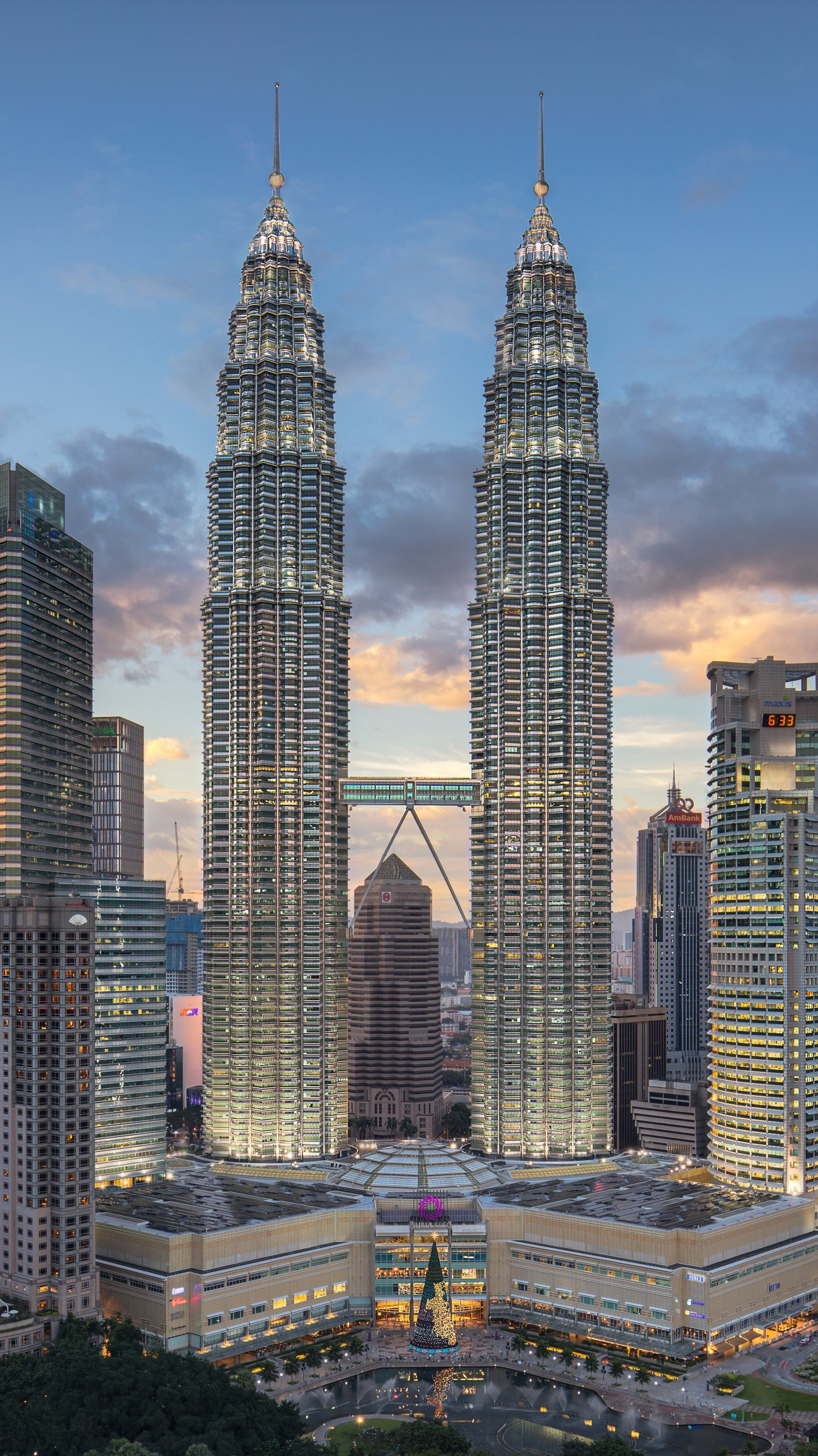
Petronas Towers

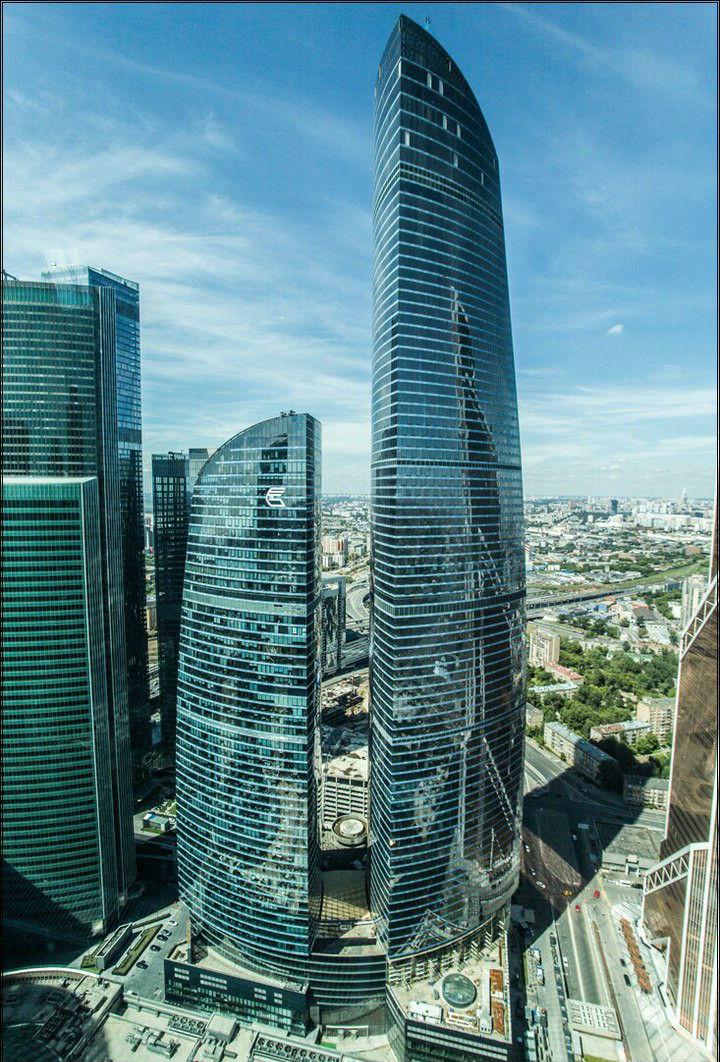
Federation Tower

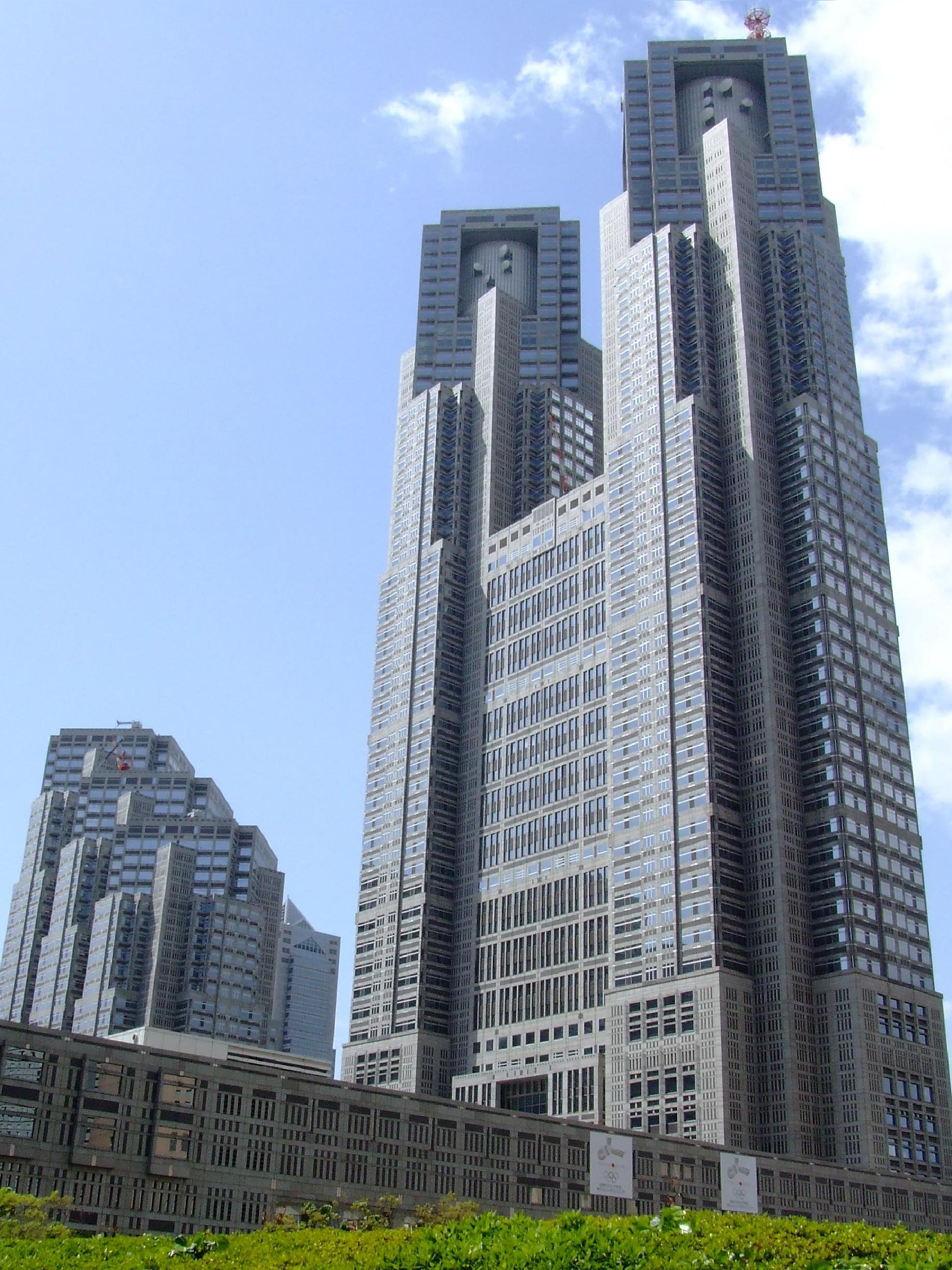
Tokyo Metropolitan Government Complex

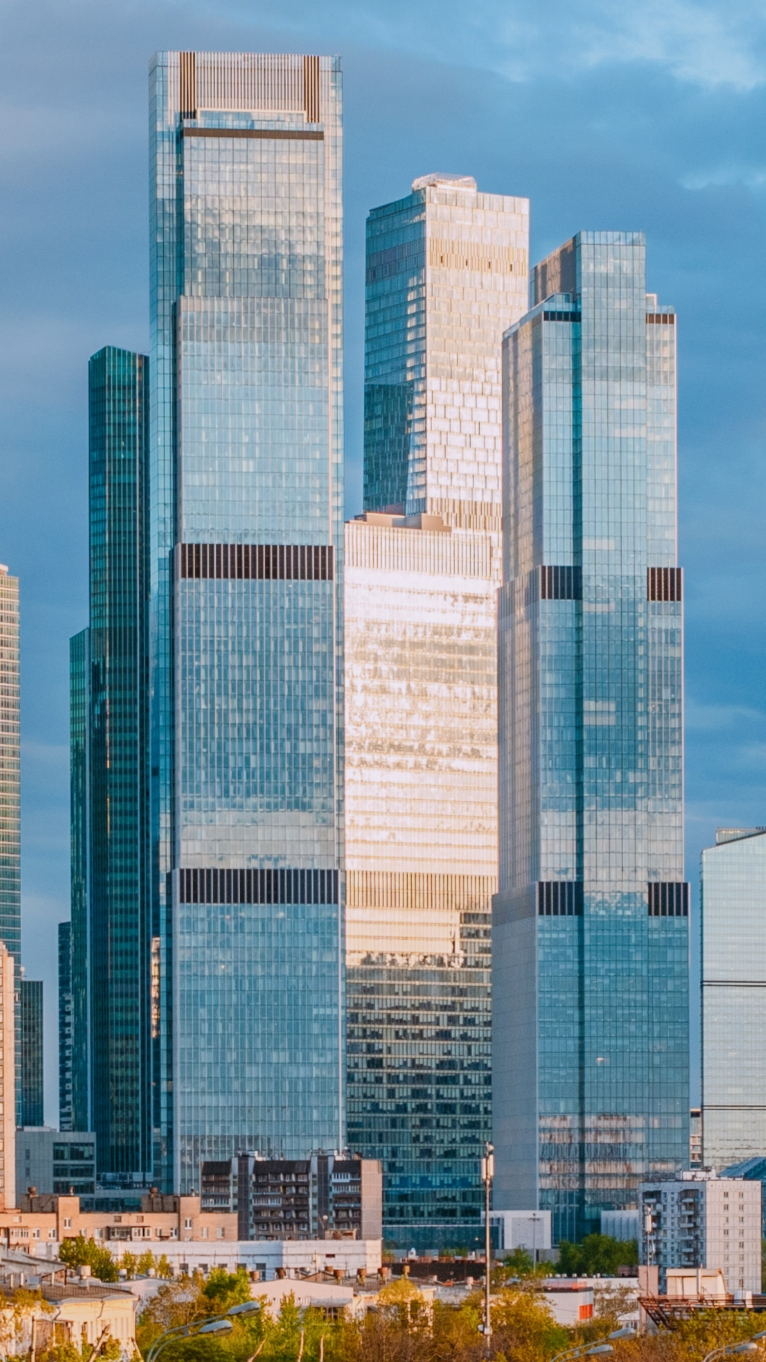
Neva Towers

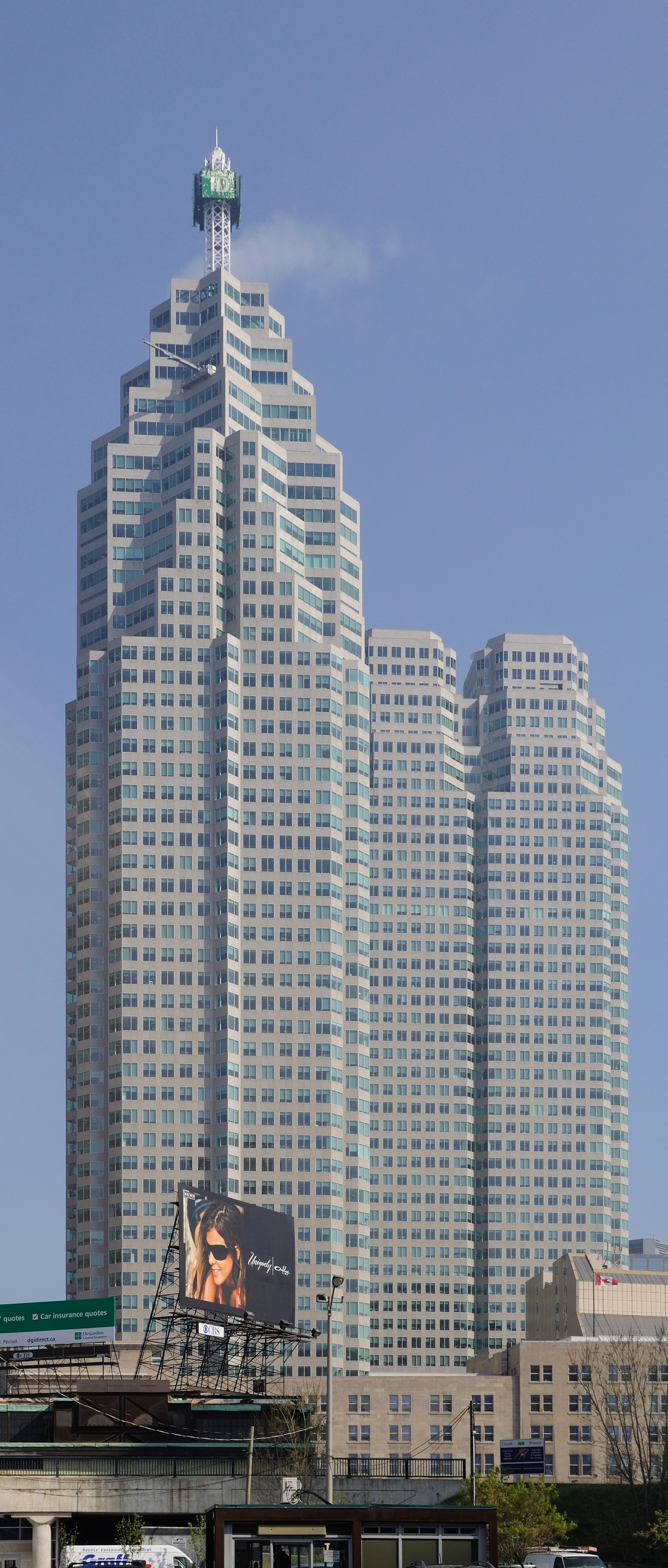
Brookfield Place (Toronto)

=== Three skyscrapers ===
This list only includes complexes that feature three skyscrapers. Other facilities may or may not be included. These complexes must have a total floor area of approximately 300,000 m^{2} (3,200,000 sq ft) or more. The "Year" column refers to the completion year of the most recently finished building in the complex.

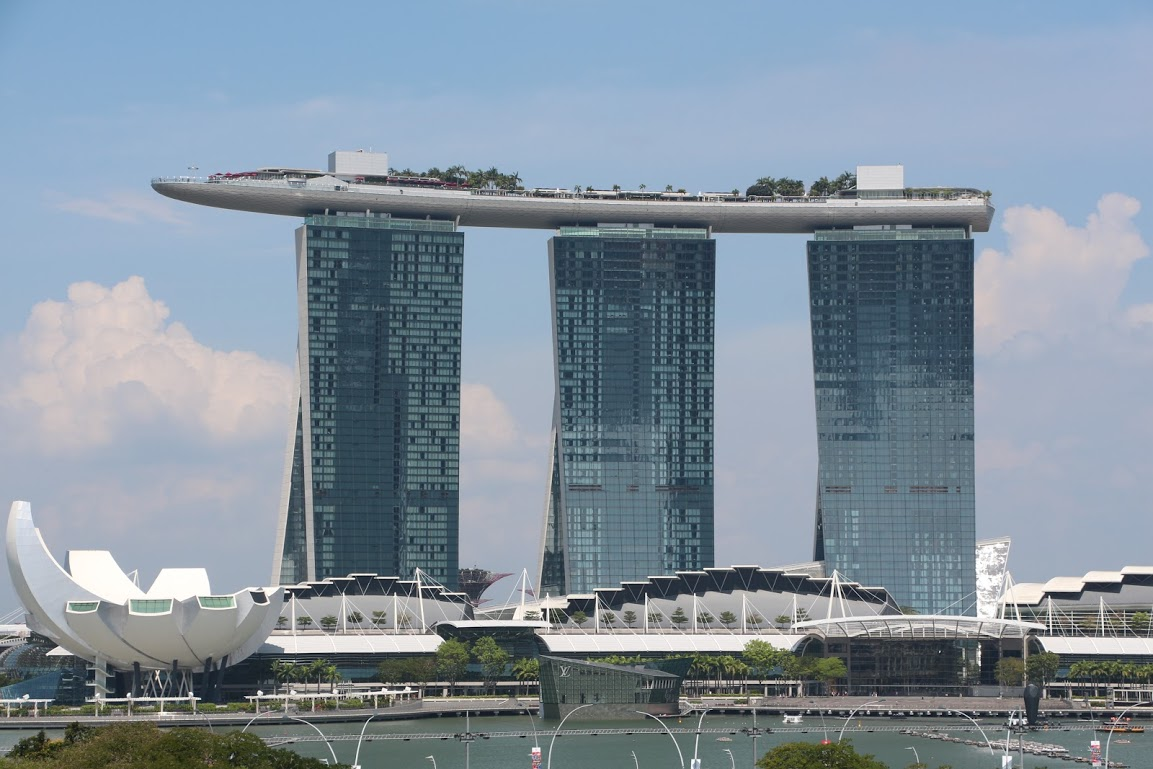
Marina Bay Sands is both a complex of three skyscrapers and a famous example of triplet buildings.

Indicates triplet skyscrapers, having the same or nearly the same height and/or identical characteristics/designs
Indicates skyscrapers that are still under construction but have been topped out

Name	Floor area m^{2} (sq ft)	City	Country	Height m (ft)Tower 1	Height m (ft)Tower 2	Height m (ft)Tower 3	Year	Notes
Golden Eagle Tiandi (Jinying World)	915,000 (9,850,000)	Nanjing	China	368 (1,208)	328 (1,076)	300 (984)	2019	Golden Eagle World (mall): 500,000 m^{2} (5,400,000 sq ft)+
Azabudai Hills	860,400 (9,261,000)	Tokyo	Japan	325 (1,068)	263 (862)	237 (778)	2025	The Garden Plaza buildings are included, amounting to approx. 43,800 m^{2} (471,000 sq ft)
Roppongi Hills	793,165 (8,537,560)	Tokyo	Japan	238 (781)	159 (522)	159 (522)	2003	Buildings shorter than 150 m (492 ft) are included
Emaar Square Istanbul	717,000 (7,720,000)	Istanbul	Turkey	245 (802)	157 (515)	142 (466)	2020	
Ping An Finance Center	690,928 (7,437,090)+	Shenzhen	China	599 (1,966)	286 (938)	209 (684)	2022	
JR Central Station Complex	682,576 (7,347,190)	Nagoya	Japan	245 (804)	226 (741)	220 (722)	2017	
Haeundae LCT The Sharp	661,138 (7,116,430)	Busan	South Korea	412 (1,350)	339 (1,113)	333 (1,093)	2019	
Landmark 72	609,673 (6,562,470)	Hanoi	Vietnam	329 (1,078)	212 (696)	212 (696)	2012	
Marina Bay Sands	581,400 (6,258,000)	Singapore	Singapore	207 (679)	207 (679)	207 (679)	2010	The three skyscrapers are topped by the Sands Skypark
Petronas Towers Complex	536,300 (5,773,000)	Kuala Lumpur	Malaysia	452 (1,483)	452 (1,483)	267 (876)	2012	Twin towers (combined): 395,000 m^{2} (4,250,000 sq ft); Twin towers (each): 197,500 m^{2} (2,126,000 sq ft); Tower 3: 141,300 m^{2} (1,521,000 sq ft)

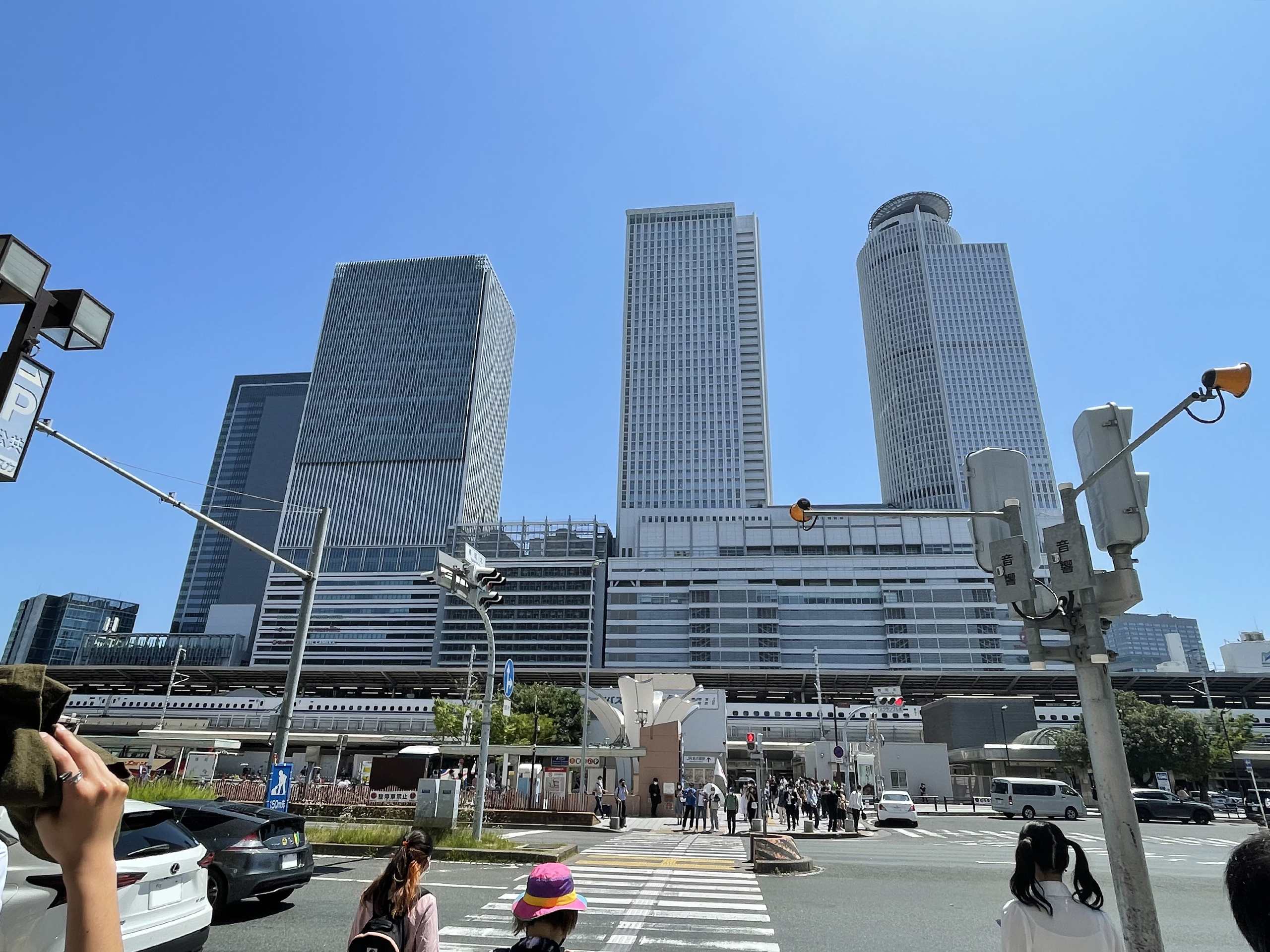
JR Central Station Complex

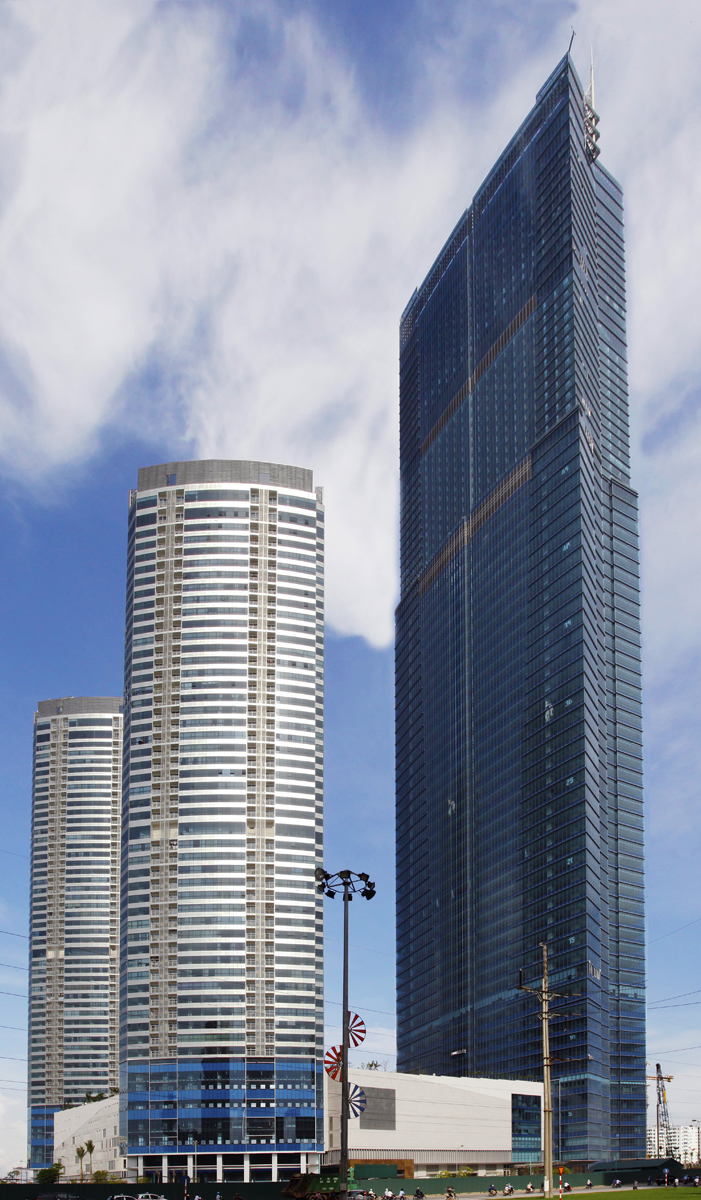
Landmark 72

=== Four skyscrapers or more ===
This list includes complexes that feature four or more skyscrapers. Other facilities may or may not be included. These complexes must have a total floor area of approximately 500,000 m^{2} (5,400,000 sq ft) or more. The "Height" column refers to the height of the tallest building within the complex, which may or may not be the largest one. The "Year" column refers to the completion year of the most recently finished building in the complex.

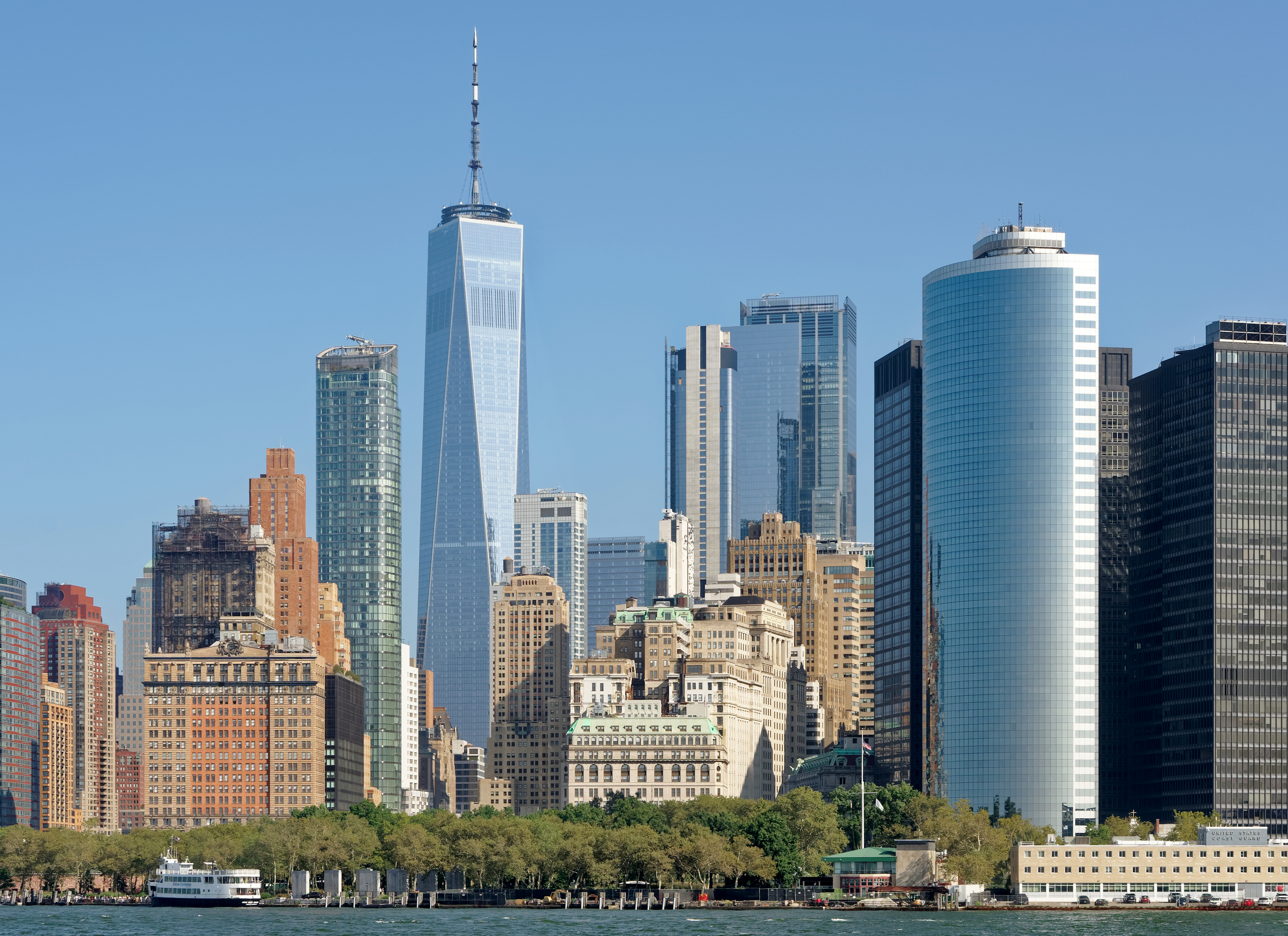
NYC's World Trade Center is a famous example of a multi-skyscraper complex, currently featuring four such buildings.

Indicates skyscrapers that are still under construction but have been topped out

Name	Floor area m^{2} (sq ft)	City	Country	Height m (ft)	Year	Notes
Abraj Al-Bait	1,575,815 (16,961,930)	Mecca	Saudi Arabia	601 (1,971)	2012	7 skyscrapers
Hudson Yards	986,766 (10,621,460)+	New York City	United States	387 (1,270)	2022	6 skyscrapers; Phase 2 will add more buildings to the complex
World Trade Center	973,847 (10,482,400)+	New York City	United States	541 (1,776)	2018	4 skyscrapers; It may be expanded to include a new 2 WTC in the future
Osaka Station City	862,000 (9,280,000)	Osaka	Japan	188 (616)	2011	・4 skyscrapers
China Resources Shenzhen Bay	858,738 (9,243,380)	Shenzhen	China	393 (1,288)	2021	6 skyscrapers
Raffles City Chongqing	817,000 (8,790,000)+	Chongqing	China	355 (1,163)	2019	8 skyscrapers
Toranomon Hills	792,900 (8,535,000)	Tokyo	Japan	266 (872)	2023	4 skyscrapers; This complex could grow to include more buildings in the future, as Mori Building are planning a redevelopment of Toranomon 3-chōme
Etihad Towers	529,987 (5,704,730)	Abu Dhabi	UAE	305 (1,002)	2011	5 skyscrapers
Renaissance Center	515,798 (5,552,000)	Detroit	United States	222 (727)	1981	5 skyscrapers

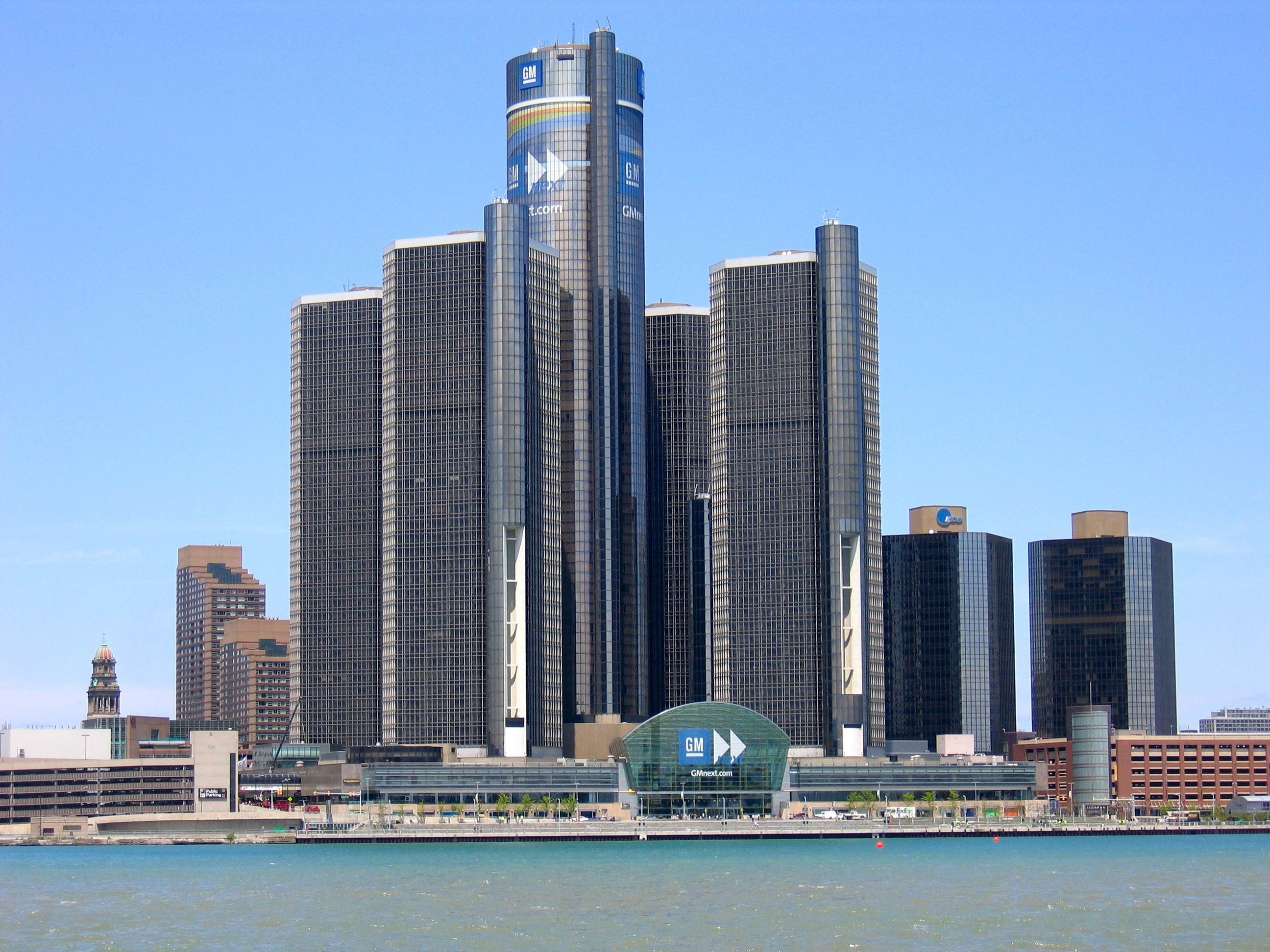
Renaissance Center

== Largest under construction ==
The tables below list skyscrapers currently under construction with floor areas expected to reach approximately 250,000 m^{2} (2,700,000 sq ft) or more. Visionary projects are excluded.

=== Under construction ===
Indicates skyscrapers that are still under construction but have been topped out

Name	Floor area m^{2} (sq ft)	Floor area (Complex) m^{2} (sq ft)	City	Country	Height m (ft)	Floors	Year	Notes
Torch Tower	553,000 (5,950,000)	748,000 (8,050,000)	Tokyo	Japan	385 (1,263)	62	2028	Set to become the tallest building in Japan; It will have 117 elevators; The Tokyo Torch complex includes the 212 m (696 ft) Tokiwabashi Tower
Suzhou CSC Fortune Center	410,090 (4,414,200)	—	Suzhou	China	460 (1,509)	100	2028	
Yaesu 2-Chōme Central District Redevelopment	388,562 (4,182,450)	—	Tokyo	Japan	223 (733)	43	2029	
Hainan Center (Haikou Tower 1)	387,423 (4,170,190)	—	Haikou	China	428 (1,404)	94	2026	Set to become the tallest building in Haikou
Nihonbashi 1-Chōme Central District Redevelopment	374,004 (4,025,750)	480,000 (5,200,000)	Tokyo	Japan	284 (932)	52	2026	The complex includes the 121 m (396 ft) COREDO Nihonbashi
Tianfu Center (Panda Tower)	350,000 (3,800,000)	—	Chengdu	China	489 (1,604)	95	2027	
North Bund Tower	349,616 (3,763,240)	—	Shanghai	China	480 (1,575)	97	2030	
Palais Royale (Mumbai)	310,000 (3,300,000)	—	Mumbai	India	297.5 (976)	84	2026	
Shinjuku Station West Gate Redevelopment	251,000 (2,700,000)	279,057 (3,003,740)	Tokyo	Japan	258 (847)	48	2030	
Wuhan CTF Finance Center	250,000 (2,700,000)	680,000 (7,300,000)	Wuhan	China	475 (1,558)	84	2029	
Jeddah Tower	243,866 (2,624,950)	—	Jeddah	Saudi Arabia	1,000+ (3,281+)	167	2028	
Burj Azizi	236,000 (2,540,000)	339,289 (3,652,080)	Dubai	United Arab Emirates	725 (2,379)	133	2030	
Taipei Twin Towers	—	590,000 (6,400,000)	Taipei	Taiwan	369 (1,211)	73	2027	

== Timeline of largest skyscrapers in the world ==
This is a list of buildings that once held the title of largest skyscraper in the world by floor area. The Empire State Building and the original World Trade Center Twin Towers each held this distinction for nearly 30 years. Currently, the title belongs to Tower A1 of SAS iTower in Hyderabad, India.

Indicates skyscrapers that have been demolished or destroyed

Name	Image	Years as largest	Floor area m^{2} (sq ft)	City	Country	Height m (ft)	Floors	Notes
Woolworth Building		1913–1915	120,773 (1,299,990)	New York City	United States	241 (792)	58	
Equitable Building (Manhattan)		1915–1931	160,655 (1,729,280)	New York City	United States	169 (555)	38	
Empire State Building		1931–1961	208,879 (2,248,350)	New York City	United States	381 (1,250)	102	
28 Liberty Street (One Chase Manhattan Plaza)		1961–1963	213,675 (2,299,980)	New York City	United States	248 (813)	60	
MetLife Building		1963–1972	263,985 (2,841,510)	New York City	United States	246 (808)	59	
1 World Trade Center (1971–2001)		1972–2001	429,583 (4,623,990)	New York City	United States	417 (1,368)	110	
2 World Trade Center (1971–2001)		1973–2001	429,583 (4,623,990)	New York City	United States	415 (1,362)	110	
Willis Tower		2001–2017	423,638 (4,560,000)	Chicago	United States	442 (1,450)	108	
Ping An Finance Center		2017–2023	459,187 (4,942,650)	Shenzhen	China	599 (1,966)	115	
Azabudai Hills Mori JP Tower		2023–2024	461,774 (4,970,490)	Tokyo	Japan	325 (1,068)	64	
SAS iTower A1		2024–present	484,586 (5,216,040)	Hyderabad	India	153.95 (505)	37	
