= Zhengdong New Area =

Zhengdong New Area 郑东新区
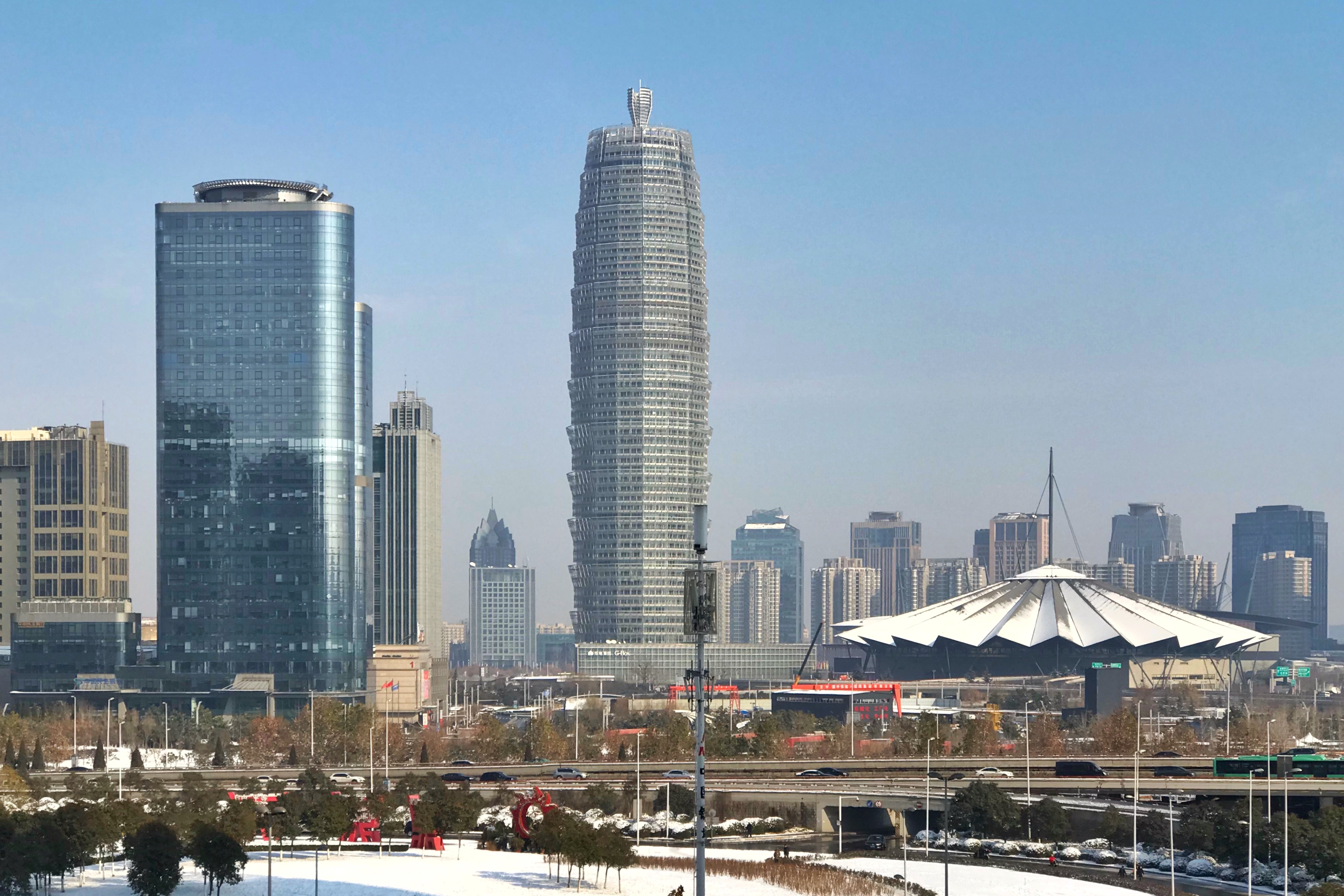
- Zhengdong CBD

- Location in Henan
- Coordinates (Zhengdong New Area administrative committee): 34°46′31″N 113°44′04″E
- Country: China
- Province: Henan
- Prefecture-level city: Zhengzhou

Area
  - Total: 260 km^{2} (100 sq mi)

Population (2015)
  - Total: 1,150,000
  - Density: 4,400/km^{2} (11,000/sq mi)
- Time zone: UTC+8 (China Standard Time)
- Postal code: 450008
- Area code: 0371
- Website: www.zhengdong.gov.cn

Zhengdong New Area (simplified Chinese: 郑东新区; traditional Chinese: 鄭東新區; pinyin: Zhèngdōng Xīn Qū) is a new area of Zhengzhou, Henan province, People's Republic of China. As of 2015, it covers an area of 260 square kilometres (100 sq mi), and is expected to expand to 500 square kilometres (193 sq mi). Zhengdong New Area was considered by foreign media to be a ghost city throughout its early years, but its rapid growth in population and commercial occupants throughout the 2010s has led to outlets to no longer consider it a ghost city. As of 2023, the new area's population totals 1,300,000, according to its government.

== History ==
Li Keqiang became the Communist Party Secretary of Henan province in 1998. As part of his advocacy for urbanisation, Li sought to position Zhengzhou as an engine for regional and national growth.

In 2001, the city government commissioned Japanese architect Kisho Kurokawa to draw up a comprehensive urban plan for Zhengdong.

With the Rise of the Central Region initiative in 2004, Henan received significant central government support, contributing to the development of Zhengdong New Area.

Zhengdong New Area consists of the core CBD area, core living area, Longhu area (龙湖; Lónghú; 'dragon lake'), and the university town of Longzihu (龙子湖; Lóngzǐhú).

=== Initial struggles ===
In a 2006 article by the Wall Street Journal, Zhengzhou's mayor projected the new area to expand to 500 square kilometres (193 sq mi) and a population of 5 million by 2020.

By 2010, Zhengdong New Area's population totaled approximately 300,000, according to its government, which projected an increase to 800,000 by 2015. In 2010, Zhengdong's gross domestic product totaled 7.48 billion renminbi.

Throughout the early 2010s, Zhengdong was covered by foreign media outlets. A piece by the Daily Mail in 2010 claimed that Zhengdong was China's largest ghost city, a March 2013 piece by 60 Minutes found "vacant subdivisions uninhabited for miles and miles and miles," and Business Insider found Zhengdong's central business district largely vacant later in 2013.

=== Rapid growth ===
However, in the following years, Zhengdong New Area experienced substantial growth. Throughout the mid-2010s, several regional headquarters of banks moved in and the area has begun to fill up with residents. In September 2012, the Zhengzhou East railway station opened in the new area, linking it to China's high speed rail network. In 2013, Zhengdong was also connected to Line 1 of the Zhengzhou Metro. Two more lines connecting Zhengdong with the center of Zhengzhou are under construction.

In 2015, Zhengdong's government reported the new area's population to be 1,150,000, far above the 800,000 total projected in 2010. They also reported that Zhengdong's gross domestic product ballooned to 26.2 billion renminbi, more than double their 2010 projection of 10.4 renminbi, and experienced an annual increase in gross domestic product of 25%.

Tales of Zhengdong's rapid growth were corroborated by a number of major media outlets. In May 2015, the South China Morning Post reported that about 150 financial institutions moved into the new area, such as HSBC, People's Bank of China, Bank of China, and Agricultural Bank of China. The publication declared that "Zhengdong is not a ghost city anymore".

In a 2021 article describing Zhengdong as "an example of how well things can go for a ghost city," Bloomberg News suggests that "favorable government policies for businesses" had attracted large pharmaceutical and auto industries to Zhengdong, prompting the new area's growth. They noted that the district's economy has grown at an annual rate of 25% from 2013 to 2018, and the population has grown 27.5% from 2019 to 2020, and that property prices have become "tenfold over the past decade".

== Geography ==
Zhengdong New Area spans from Zhongzhou Avenue to its west, to Wansan Highway (Chinese: 万三公路) to its east. To its north is the southern banks of the Yellow River, and to its south is the Longhai railway.

== Office Buildings ==
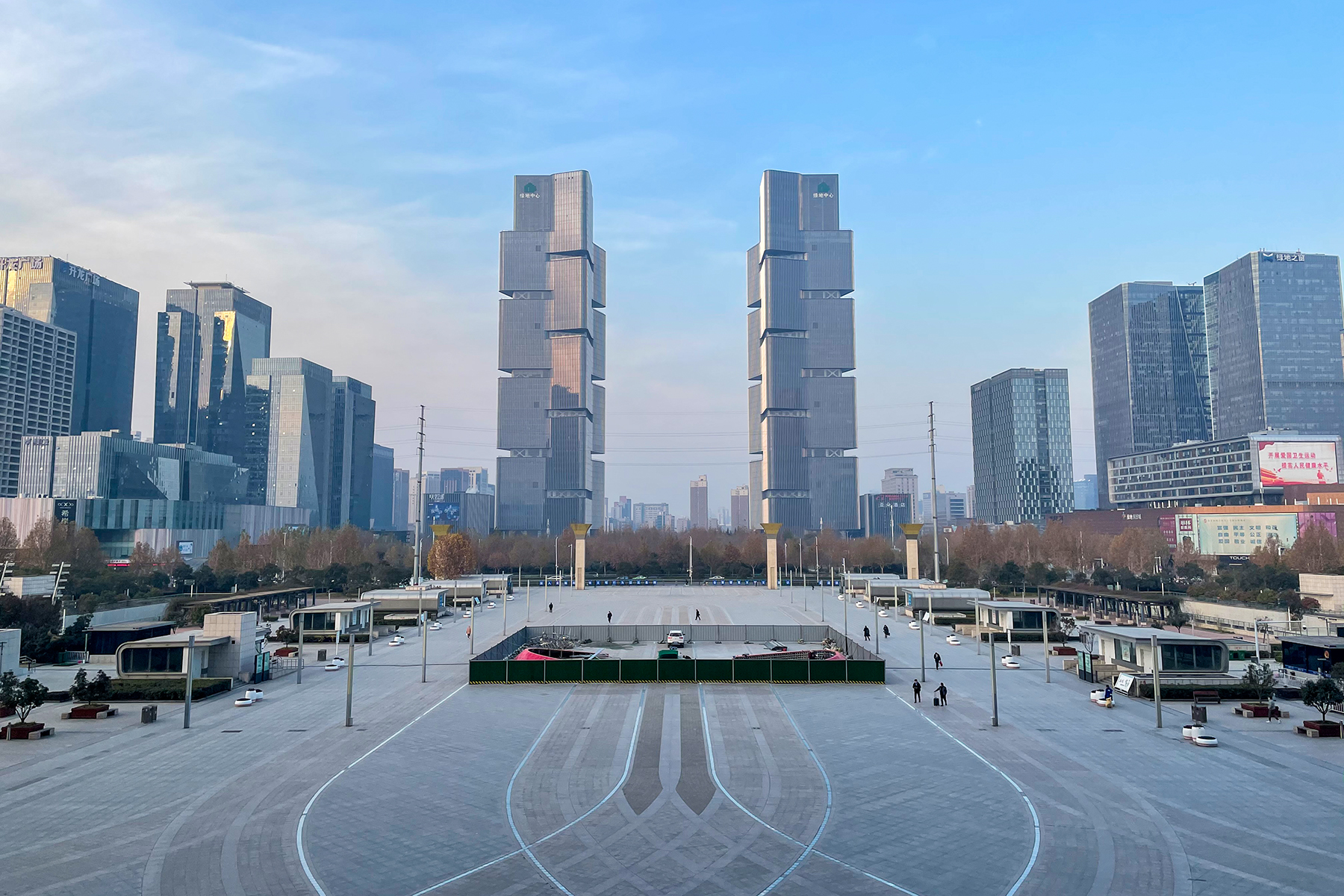
Zhengzhou Greenland Central Plaza

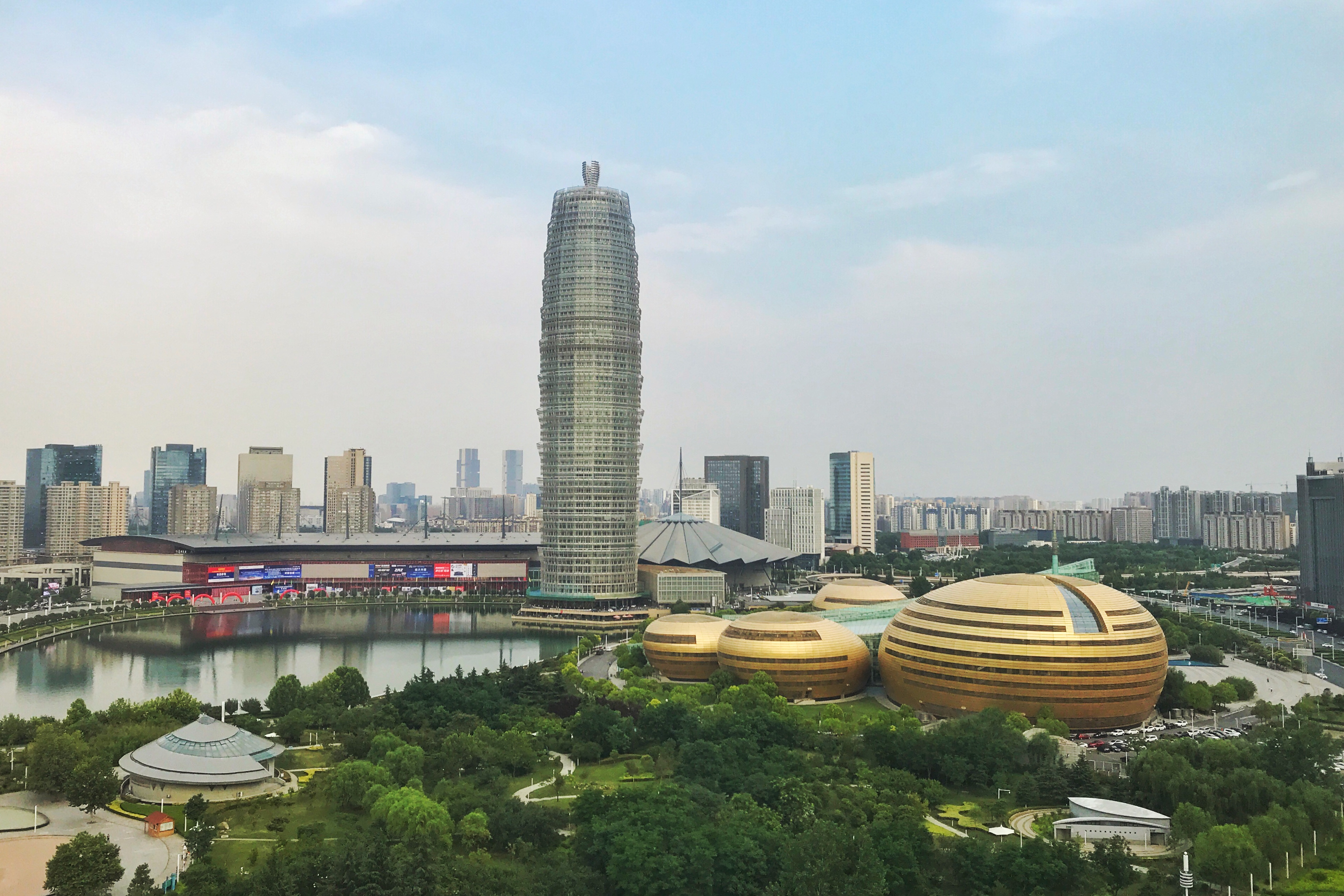
Zhengzhou Greenland Plaza

Zhengdong New Area is home to some highest skyscrapers in Zhengzhou, including the following:

- Zhengzhou Greenland Plaza
- Zhengzhou Greenland Central Plaza
