= Tokyo Torch =

Large real estate project in Tokyo, Japan

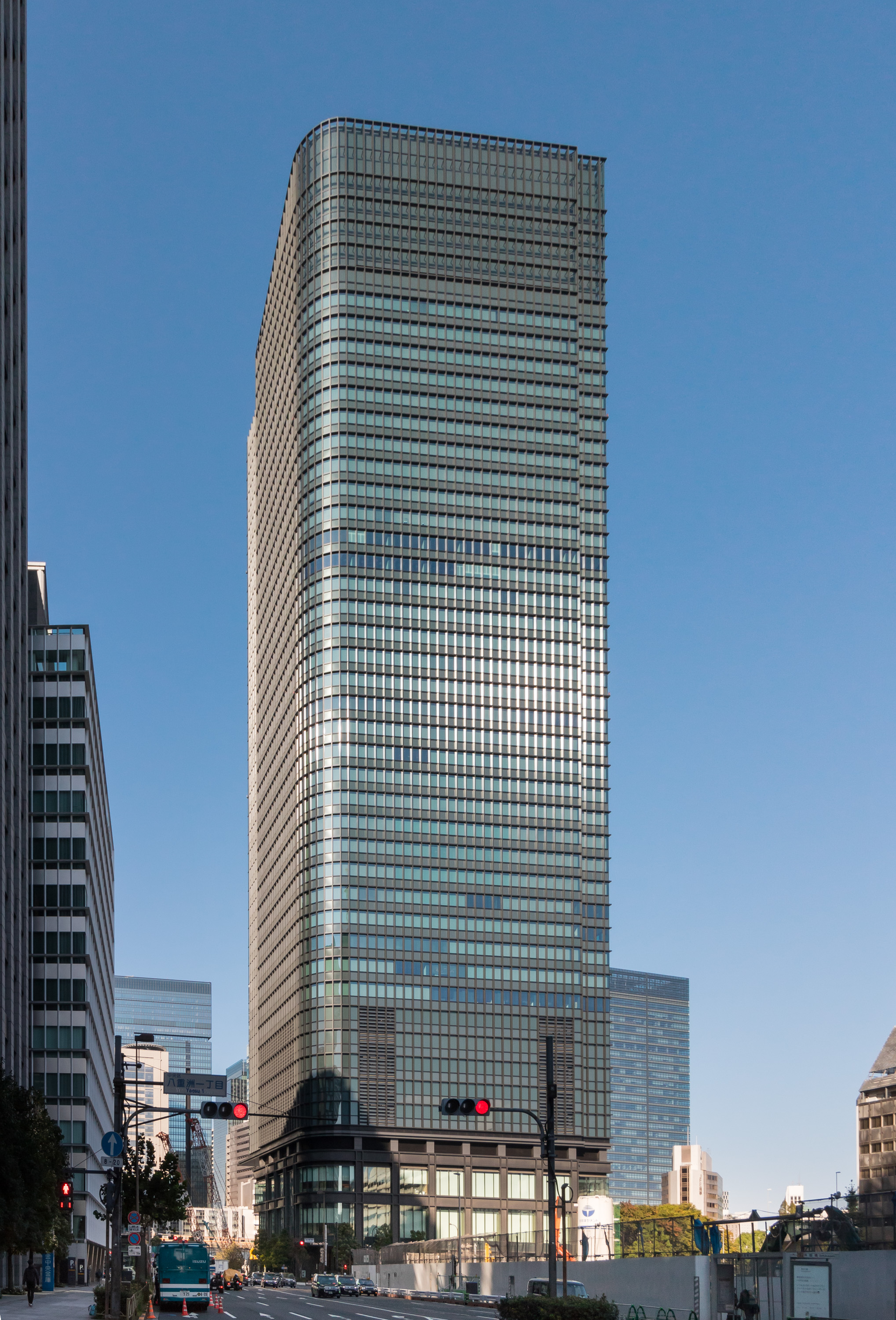
Tokiwabashi Tower.

Tokyo Torch (stylized in all caps) is a major redevelopment of the Tokiwabashi District near Tokyo Station in Tokyo, Japan. Scheduled for completion in March 2028, the real estate project will include two skyscrapers:

- Tokiwabashi Tower (completed in 2021)
- Torch Tower (scheduled to be completed in 2028 as Japan's tallest building)

In addition to the skyscrapers, the project includes the new Electrical Substation Building, Waterworks & Sewerage Bureau Building, a plaza, and landscaped waterfront along Nihombashi River. In total, it will cover a 31,400-square-meter area near the Marunouchi commercial district. Seeing a strong demand for office space, developer Mitsubishi Estate said it was building the district to create renewed interest in the area as a business destination.

The project's large plaza is named Tokyo Torch Terrace, designed to serve visitors and employees who work in the towers. It initially opened in 2021 as a 3,000-square meter open space with turf and cherry trees, but will be expanded to a 7,000-square meter plaza in 2027 to fill the space between the buildings. Developers said plans for the outdoor spaces were expanded in light of the COVID-19 pandemic.

Tokyo Torch will be directly connected to Ōtemachi subway station, and to Tokyo Station via underground passageways.

On September 17, 2020, it was announced that the name of the redevelopment area had been decided as "Tokyo Torch", and the official names of the skyscrapers as "Tokiwabashi Tower" and "Torch Tower". The name, "Tokyo Torch", was chosen in the hope that it will "illuminate Japan", in particular the Torch Tower, which will have a torch-inspired design. The project is expected to cost about ¥500 billion (4.77 billion U.S. dollars).

== Project schedule ==
- 2017
  - Start of demolition of buildings on the planned construction site of the Tokiwabashi Tower.
- 2018
  - Completion of demolition work on the site of the Tokiwabashi Tower.
  - Start of construction of the Tokiwabashi Tower.
- 2021
  - Completion of the Tokiwabashi Tower.
  - Start of demolition of buildings on the planned construction site of the Torch Tower.
- 2023
  - Completion of demolition work on the site of the Torch Tower.
  - Start of construction of the Torch Tower.
- 2027
  - Completion of the Torch Tower.
  - Completion of the plaza.
