= Zhengzhou Greenland Plaza =

Skyscraper in Zhengzhou, Henan, China

Millennium Royal Plaza
- 绿地中心·千玺广场
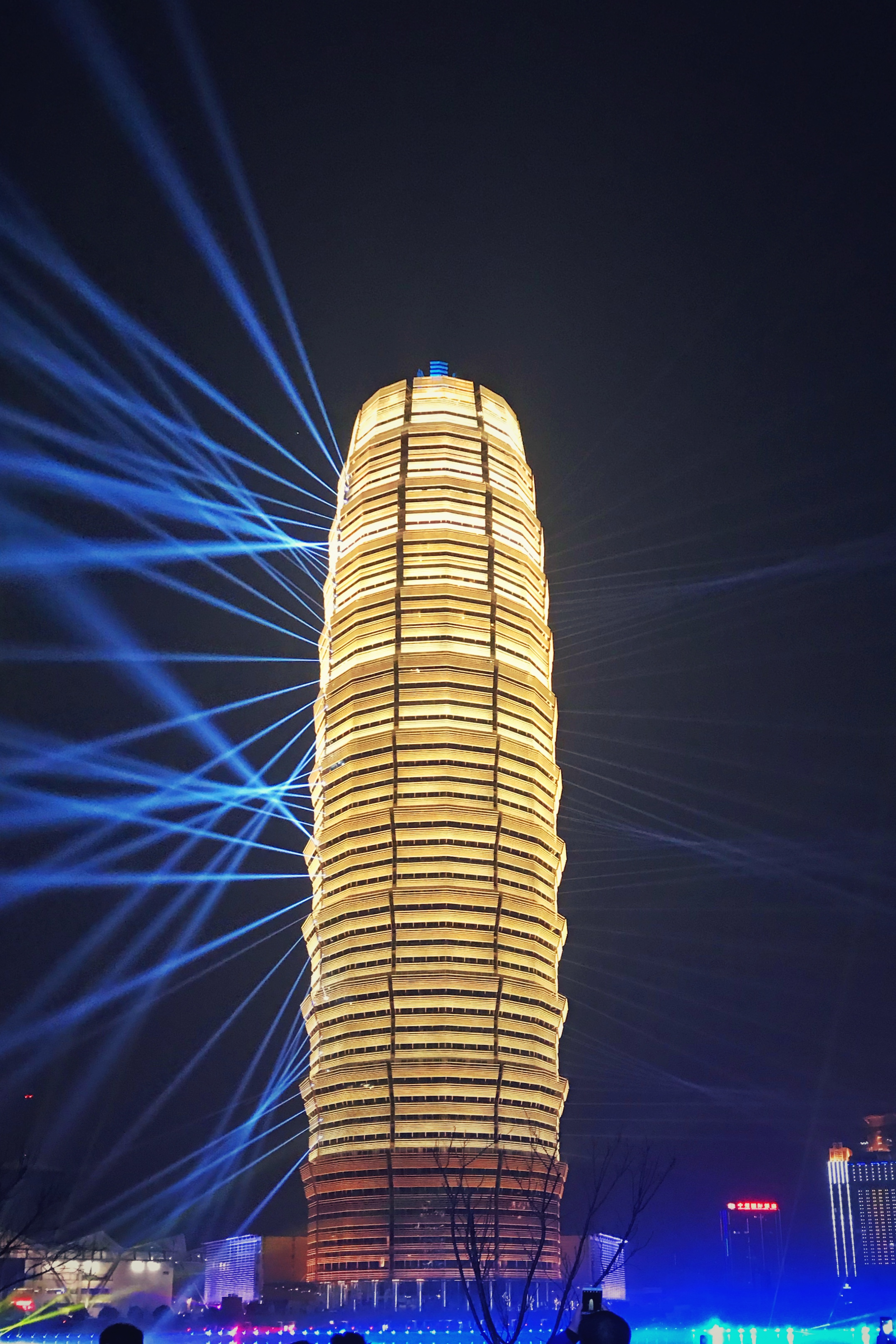
- Interactive map of the Millennium Royal Plaza area
- Alternative names: Zhengzhou Greenland Plaza; The "Big Corn"

General information
- Status: Completed
- Architectural style: Chinese Revival
- Location: Zhengdong New Area CBD, Zhengzhou, Henan, China
- Coordinates: 34°46′18″N 113°43′15″E
- Current tenants: JW Marriott Hotel Zhengzhou
- Construction started: 2007
- Completed: 2012
- Owner: Greenland Group

Height
- Architectural: 280 metres (918.6 ft)

Technical details
- Floor count: 56

Design and construction
- Architecture firm: Skidmore, Owings & Merrill
- Developer: Greenland Group

Zhengzhou Greenland Plaza, also named as Millennium Royal Plaza, is a skyscraper in Zhengzhou, Henan, China. It is 280 metres (918.6 ft) tall. Construction started in 2007 and was completed in 2012.

The building was the tallest skyscraper in Zhengzhou upon its completion in 2012. It was later surpassed by the twin towers of Zhengzhou Greenland Central Plaza when the twin towers were completed in November 2016.

== Nickname ==
This building is often referred to as the "Big Corn" (Chinese: 大玉米) by local residents, due to its corn-like shape and all yellow lighting at night.

== See also ==
- List of tallest buildings in China
