= Torch Tower (Japan) =

Supertall skyscraper under construction in Tokyo, Japan

- An artist's rendition

General information
- Status: On hold
- Type: Mixed-use
- Location: Tokyo Torch, Tokyo, Japan
- Construction started: 27 September 2023
- Estimated completion: 1 March 2028

Height
- Architectural: 385 m (1,263 ft)
- Roof: 366 m (1,201 ft)
- Top floor: 358 m (1,175 ft)
- Observatory: 349 m (1,145 ft)

Technical details
- Floor count: 65 (62 above ground, 4 below)
- Floor area: 542,000 m^{2} (5,834,000 sq ft)

Design and construction
- Architects: Mitsubishi Jisho Sekkei; Sou Fujimoto Architects; Yuko Nagayama Associates
- Developer: Mitsubishi Estate
- Main contractor: Shimizu Corporation

Website
- office.mec.co.jp/en/tokiwabashi/

The Torch Tower is a supertall skyscraper under construction in the Tokyo Torch redevelopment district in Tokyo, Japan. Scheduled to be completed in 2028, it will be the tallest building in Japan, surpassing the 325.2 m (1,067 ft) Azabudai Hills Mori JP Tower.

== Location ==
The 385 m (1,263 ft) tall skyscraper will be the focal point of a redevelopment district called Tokyo Torch, near Tokyo Station. The district also features a second skyscraper, the 212 m (696 ft) tall Tokiwabashi Tower, which was completed in June 2021.

== Building ==
The Torch Tower will feature 67 floors in total, 62 above ground and four below ground. Floors 7 through 52 will be used for offices, while higher floors will be home to a luxury hotel and an observation deck, where visitors can view the Tokyo Bay and Mount Fuji, Japan's tallest mountain. The observation deck on the top floor of the building is expected to attract 3 to 4 million visitors annually. The lower floors will include a large events hall with seats for up to 2,000 people.

The luxury hotel will be located on the 51st to 61st floors, at a height of more than 300 m (980 ft). The lobby floor of the hotel is designed to take in fresh air from the outside in a space surrounded by greenery, including trees.

The exterior of the building will have a torch-inspired design. The name, Torch Tower, was chosen in the hope that the tower will "illuminate Japan".

The total floor area will be circa 542,000 m^{2} (5,834,000 sq ft). This is 1.75 times as much floor space as the Burj Khalifa's 309,472 m^{2} (3,331,000 sq ft).

Construction started in October 2023 and is scheduled to be completed in 2028. The project is expected to cost about ¥500 billion (US$4.77 billion).

== See also ==
- Tokyo Torch, the entire district
- Tokiwabashi Tower, the second skyscraper at Tokyo Torch
- List of tallest buildings in Japan
