= Zhengzhou Greenland Central Plaza =

Skyscraper in Zhengzhou, Henan, China

- 郑州绿地中心
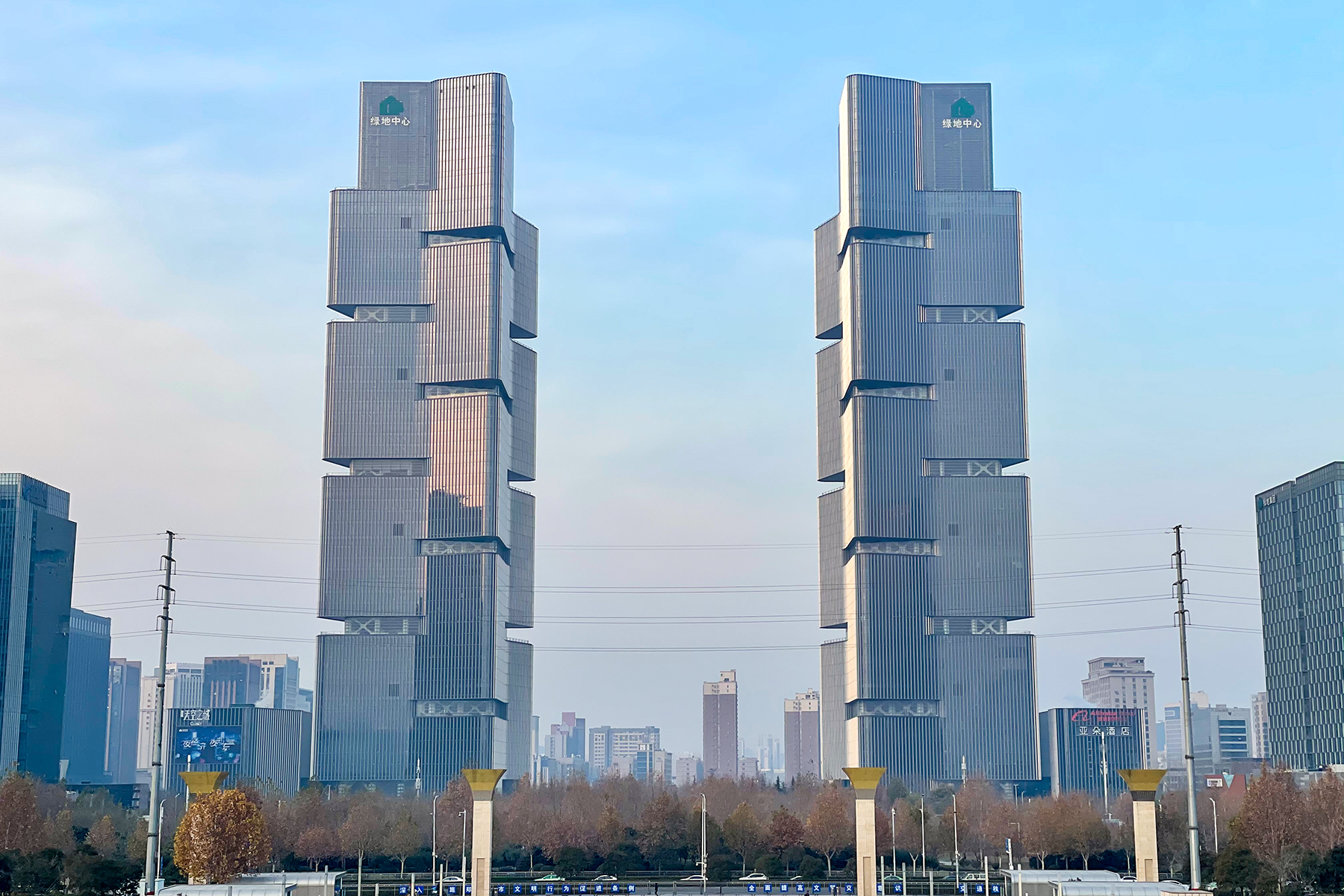
- Interactive map of the Zhengzhou Greenland Central Plaza area

General information
- Status: Completed
- Location: Zhengdong New Area, Zhengzhou East railway station West Plaza, Zhengzhou, Henan, China
- Coordinates: 34°45′36″N 113°45′43″E
- Groundbreaking: 2010
- Construction started: 2011
- Completed: November 2016
- Owner: Greenland Group

Height
- Tip: 284 m (932 ft) (Tower 1 and 2)
- Antenna spire: 284 m (932 ft) (Tower 1 and 2)

Technical details
- Floor count: 63 x 2

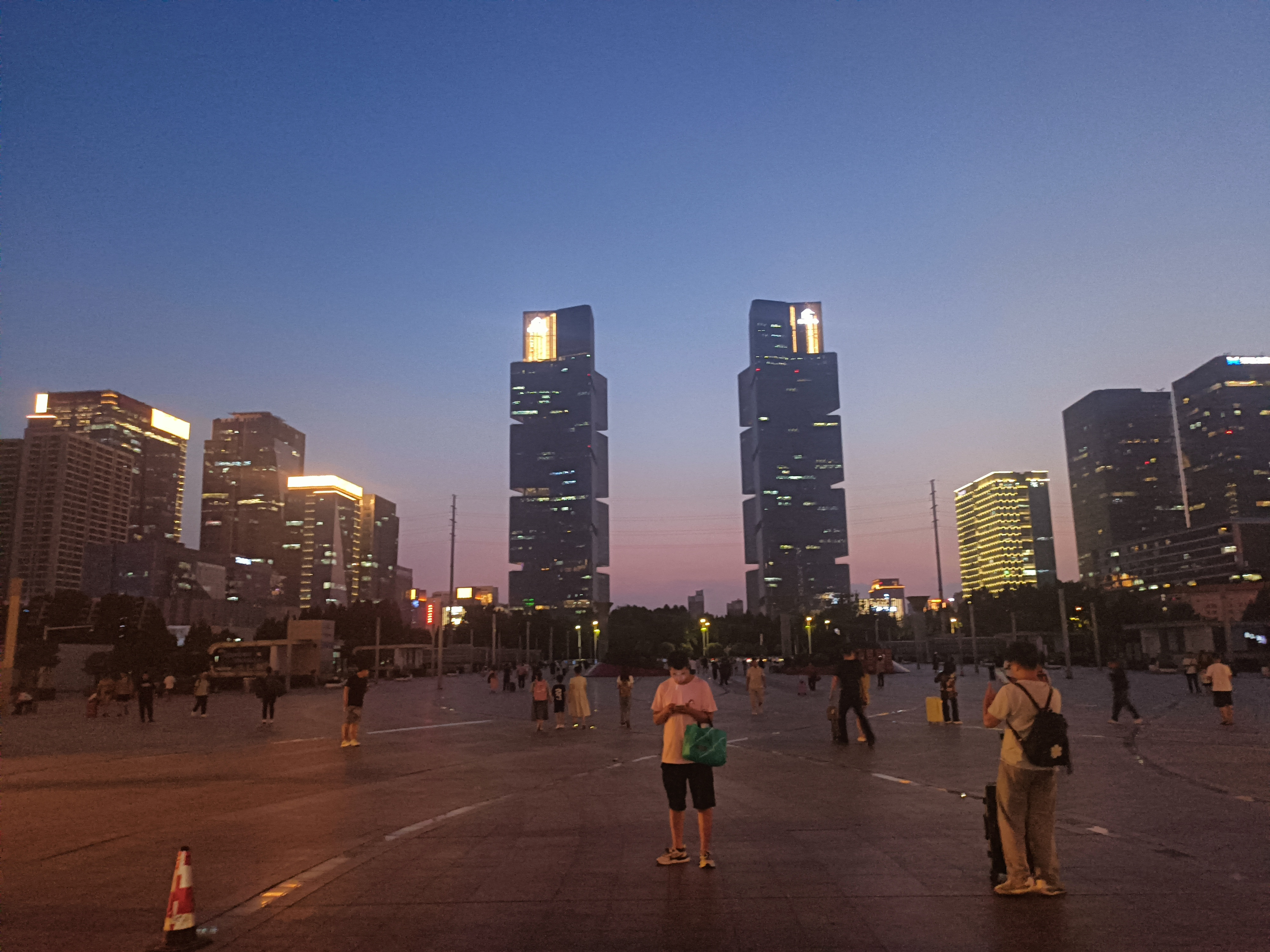
The Twin Towers of Greenland Center in Zhengzhou, Henan Province, China

Zhengzhou Greenland Central Plaza
- Simplified Chinese: 郑东绿地中心
- Traditional Chinese: 鄭東綠地中心
Transcriptions
Standard Mandarin
- Hanyu Pinyin: Zhèngdōng Lǜdì Zhōngxīn

Zhengzhou Greenland Central Plaza is an office complex in the Zhengdong New Area of Zhengzhou, Henan. The complex consists of two skyscrapers: the south tower and the north tower. Both towers are 284 m (932 ft) tall with 63 floors. Completed in late 2016, the twin towers have become the tallest skyscrapers in Zhengzhou, surpassing the 280 m (920 ft) high Zhengzhou Greenland Plaza.

== See also ==
- Zhengzhou Greenland Plaza
- Dalian Greenland Center
- Wuhan Greenland Center
- Goldin Finance 117
- China Zun
- Tianjin Chow Tai Fook Binhai Center
