= Tokiwabashi Tower =

Skyscraper in Tokyo, Japan

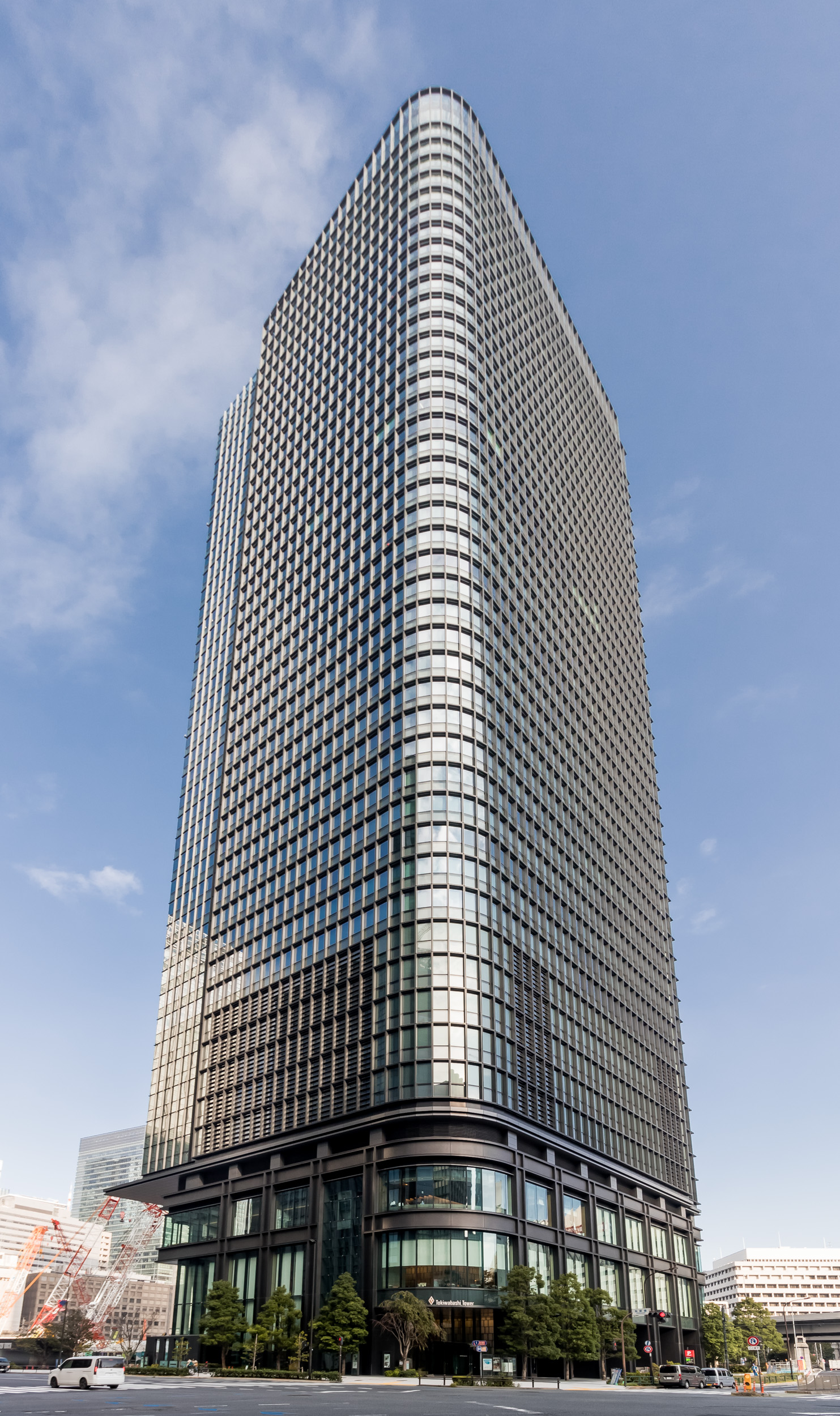

General information
- Status: Completed
- Type: Commercial
- Location: Tokyo Torch, Tokyo, Japan
- Construction started: January 2018
- Completed: June 30, 2021

Height
- Architectural: 212 m (696 ft)

Design and construction
- Architect: Mitsubishi Jisho Sekkei
- Developer: Mitsubishi Estate

Tokiwabashi Tower is a skyscraper at the Tokyo Torch redevelopment district in Tokyo, Japan. It was completed on June 30, 2021, as the 28th tallest building in Japan.

== Location ==
Tokiwabashi Tower is 212 meters tall and is located on the former site of the JX Building and the Daiwa Gofukubashir Building, near Tokyo Station. Also known as Tower A, it is one of two skyscrapers at the redevelopment site, the other one being the Torch Tower, which will be 385 meters tall when it is completed in 2027.

== Building ==
Tokiwabashi Tower has 43 floors in total, of which 38 are above ground and 5 below ground—with 3 of them being used as a parking garage. The ground and first floors of the tower have retail areas and restaurants with seats facing the district's plaza, which will cover an area of 7,000-square meters when it is completed in 2027.

The third and eighth floors at Tokiwabashi Tower are shared spaces with a mix of cafeterias, meeting rooms and event spaces. All other floors are used for offices.

== See also ==
- Tokyo Torch, the entire district
- Torch Tower, the second skyscraper at Tokyo Torch
- List of tallest structures in Japan
