= Qinlinglu station =

Metro station in Zhengzhou, China

Qinlinglu 秦岭路
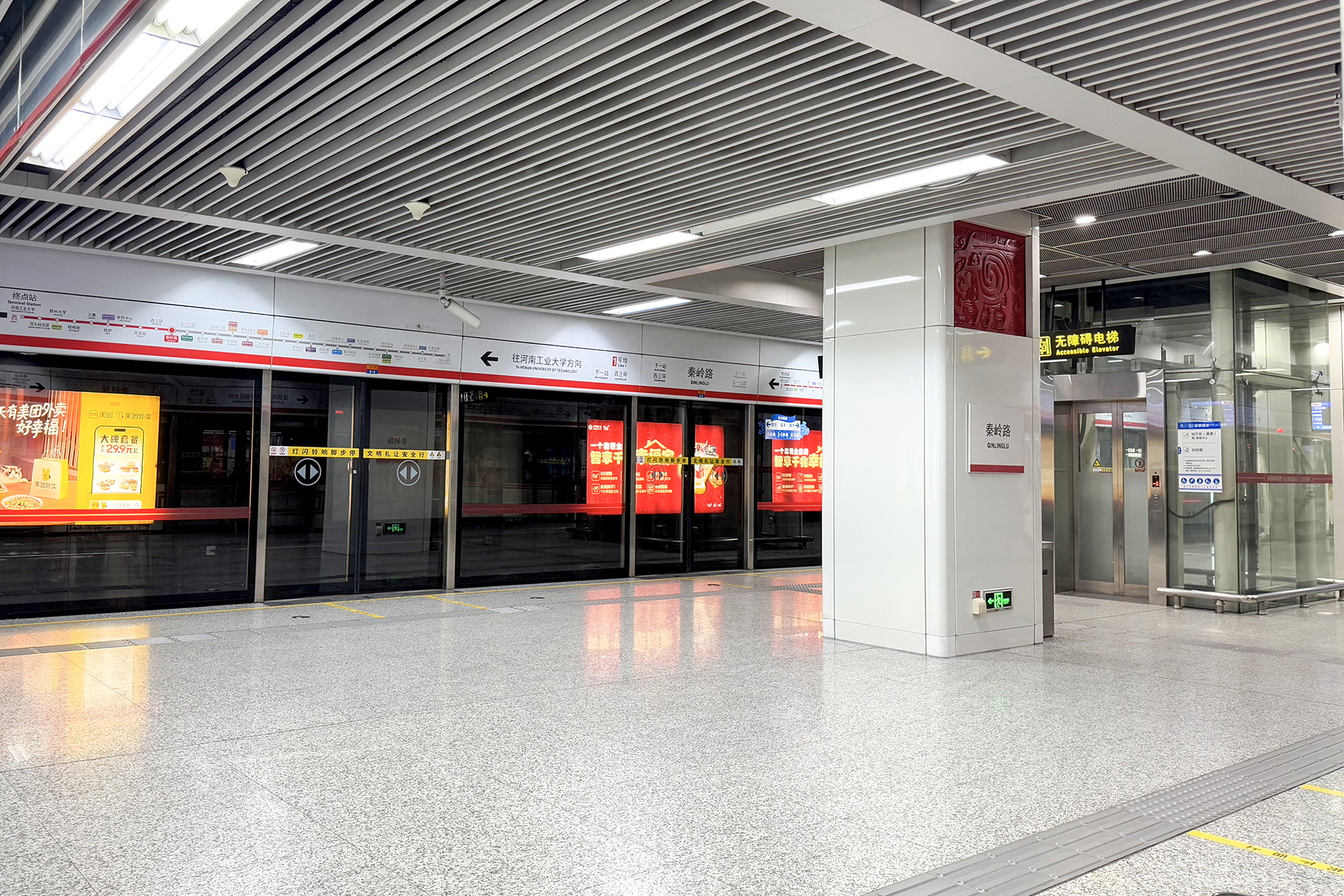

General information
- Location: Jianshe Road × Qinling Road; Zhongyuan District, Zhengzhou; China
- Coordinates: 34.7578°N 113.5973°E
- System: Zhengzhou Metro rapid transit station
- Operator: Zhengzhou Metro
- Line: Line 1
- Platforms: 2 (1 island platform)
- Connections: Bus; Zhengzhou BRT

Construction
- Structure type: Underground

Other information
- Station code: 123

History
- Opened: 28 December 2013

Services
Preceding station	Zhengzhou Metro	Following station
Xisanhuan towards Henan University of Technology	Line 1	Wuyigongyuan towards New Campus of Henan University
Location
- Location within Zhengzhou

Qinlinglu (Chinese: 秦岭路) is a metro station of Zhengzhou Metro Line 1.

The station is located at the crossing of Jianshe Road and Qinling Road, and named after Qinling Road.

== Station layout ==
The station has 2 floors underground. The B1 floor is for the station concourse and the B2 floor is for the platforms and tracks. The station has one island platform and two tracks for Line 1.

G	-	Exit
B1	Concourse	Customer Service, Vending machines
B2; Platforms	Platform 2	← Line 1 towards Henan University of Technology (Xisanhuan)
B2; Platforms	Island platform, doors will open on the left
B2; Platforms	Platform 1	Line 1 towards New Campus of Henan University (Wuyigongyuan) →

== Exits ==
Exit	Destination
Exit A	Jianshe Road (north side), Qinling Road (east side)
Exit B	Jianshe Road (south side), Qinling Road (east side)
Exit C	Jianshe Road (south side), Zhengzhou West Coach Station
Exit D1	Jianshe Road (north side), Qinling Road (west side)
Exit D2	CCmall

== Surroundings ==
- Zhengzhou West Coach Station (汽车客运西站)
- CCmall (大摩西元广场)
