= Civic Center station (Zhengzhou Metro) =

Metro station in Zhengzhou, China

Civic Center 市民中心
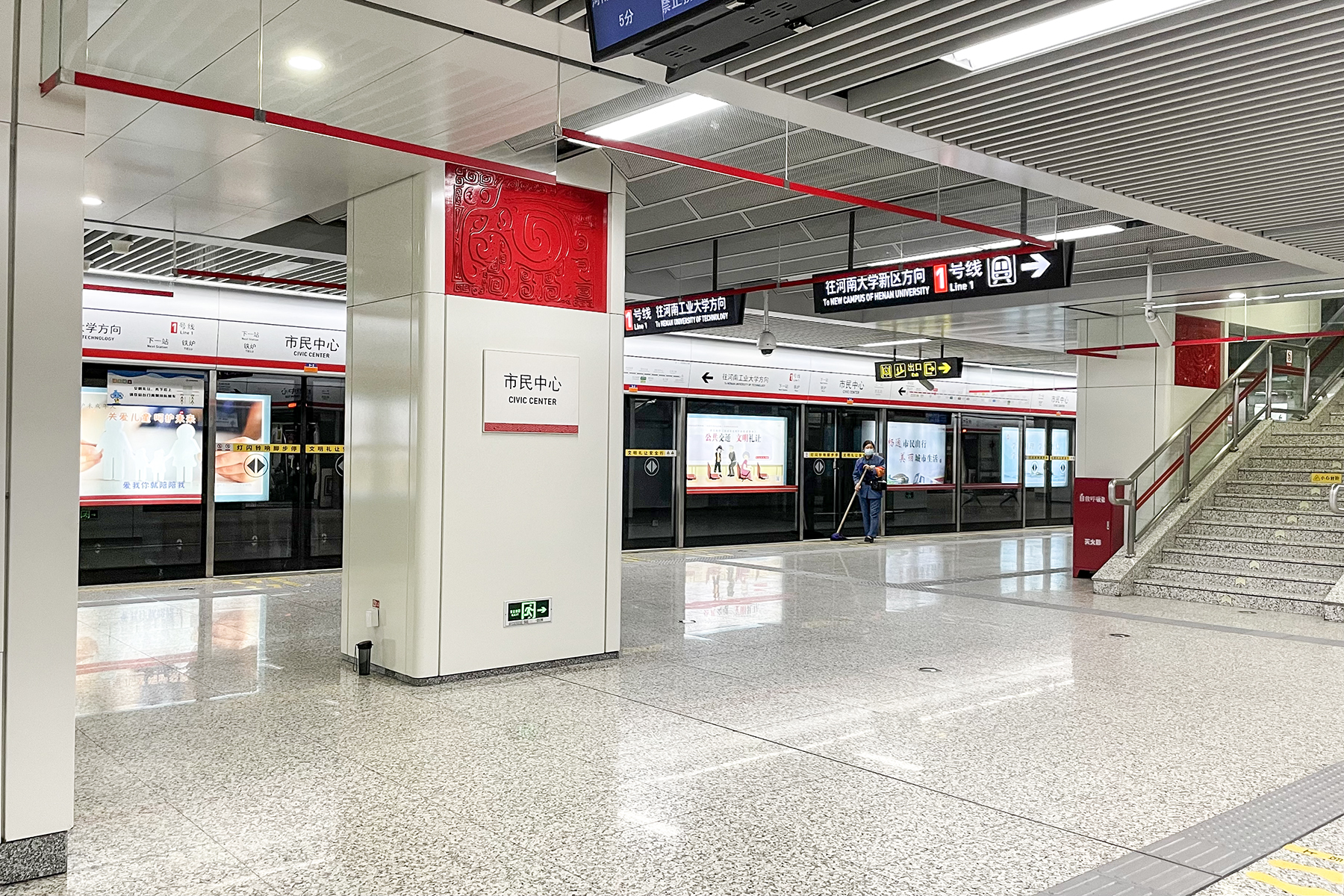

General information
- Location: Jianshe West Road × Fumin Street; Zhongyuan District, Zhengzhou; China
- Coordinates: 34.7632°N 113.5477°E
- System: Zhengzhou Metro rapid transit station
- Operator: Zhengzhou Metro
- Line: Line 1
- Platforms: 2 (1 island platform)
- Connections: Bus

Construction
- Structure type: Underground

Other information
- Station code: 120

History
- Opened: 12 January 2017

Services
Preceding station	Zhengzhou Metro	Following station
Tielu towards Henan University of Technology	Line 1	Xiliuhu towards New Campus of Henan University
Location
- Location within Zhengzhou

Civic Center (Chinese: 市民中心) is a station of Phase II of Line 1, Zhengzhou Metro. The station was opened on 12 January 2017.

== Station layout ==
The station has 2 floors underground. The B1 floor is for the station concourse and the B2 floor is for the platforms and tracks. The station has one island platform and two tracks for Line 1.

G	-	Exit
B1	Concourse	Customer Service, Vending machines
B2; Platforms	Platform 2	← Line 1 towards Henan University of Technology (Tielu)
B2; Platforms	Island platform, doors will open on the left
B2; Platforms	Platform 1	Line 1 towards New Campus of Henan University (Xiliuhu) →

== Exits ==
Exit	Destination
Exit A	Jianshe West Road (north side)
Exit B	Jianshe West Road (north side)
Exit C	Jianshe West Road (south side)
