= Xisanhuan station =

Metro station in Zhengzhou, China

Xisanhuan 西三环
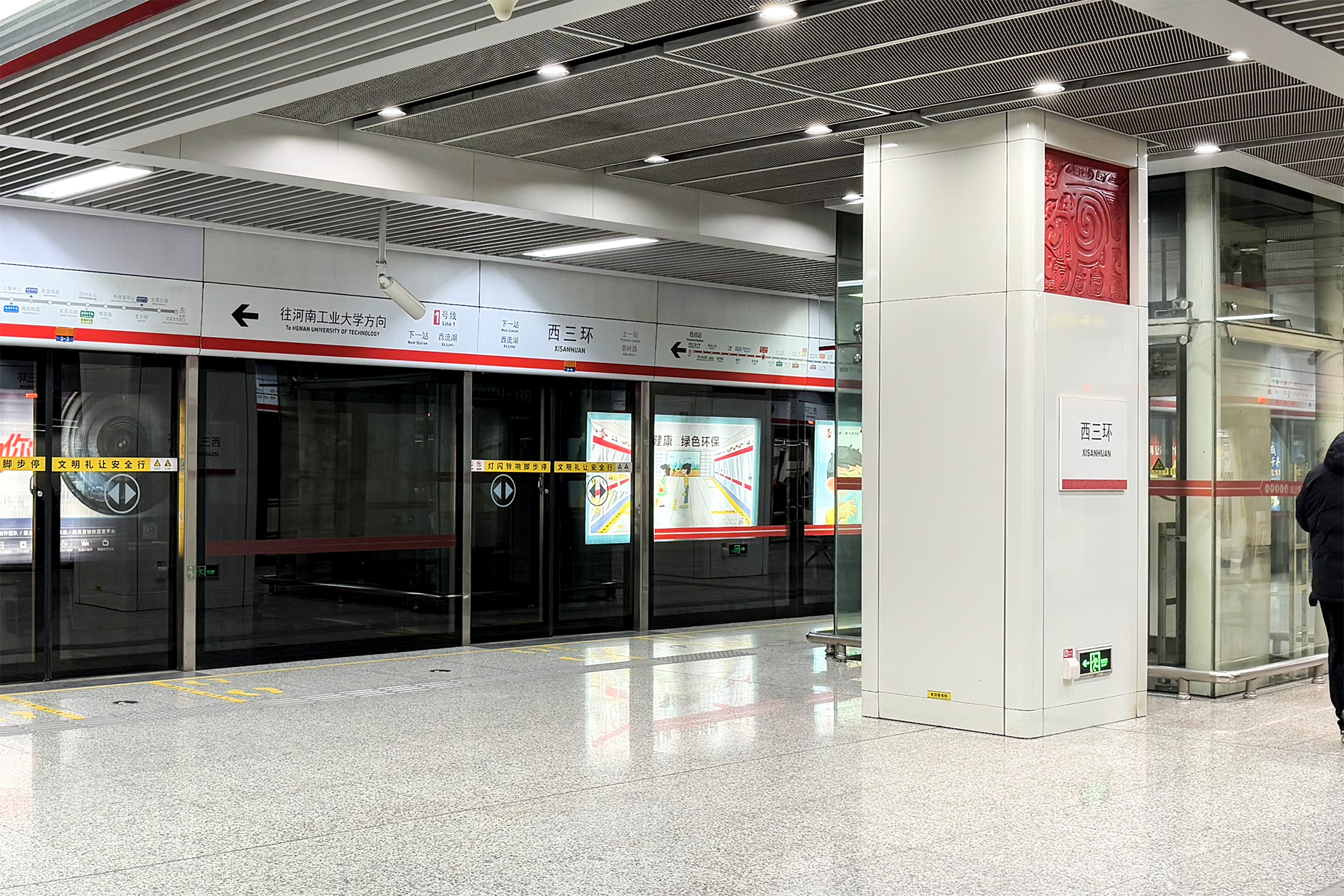

General information
- Location: East to the interchange of Jianshe Road and West 3rd Ring Road; Zhongyuan District, Zhengzhou; China
- Coordinates: 34.7610°N 113.5825°E
- System: Zhengzhou Metro rapid transit station
- Operator: Zhengzhou Metro
- Line: Line 1
- Platforms: 2 (1 island platform)
- Connections: Bus

Construction
- Structure type: Underground

Other information
- Station code: 122

History
- Opened: 28 December 2013

Services
| Preceding station | Zhengzhou Metro | Following station |
|---|---|---|
| Xiliuhu towards Henan University of Technology | Line 1 | Qinlinglu towards New Campus of Henan University |
Location
- Location within Zhengzhou

Xisanhuan (Chinese: 西三环) is a metro station of Zhengzhou Metro Line 1.

The station is named after the West 3rd Ring Road (Xisanhuan in pinyin). Since the road is over 10 kilometres (6.2 mi) long, it is hard to locate the station according to its name. The naming of the station is considered to be confusing and thus criticized by some people on local forums.

== Station layout ==
The station has 2 floors underground. The B1 floor is for the station concourse and the B2 floor is for the platforms and tracks. The station has one island platform and two tracks for Line 1.

| G | - | Exit |
| B1 | Concourse | Customer Service, Vending machines |
| B2; Platforms | Platform 2 | ← Line 1 towards Henan University of Technology (Xiliuhu) |
| B2; Platforms | Island platform, doors will open on the left |
| B2; Platforms | Platform 1 | Line 1 towards New Campus of Henan University (Qinlinglu) → |

== Exits ==
| Exit | Destination |
|---|---|
| Exit B1 | Jianshe Road (north side) |
| Exit B2 | Jianshe Road (south side) |
| Exit C | Xiliuhu Park |

== Surroundings ==
- Xiliuhu Park
