= Tielu station (Zhengzhou Metro) =

Metro station in Zhengzhou, China

Tielu 铁炉
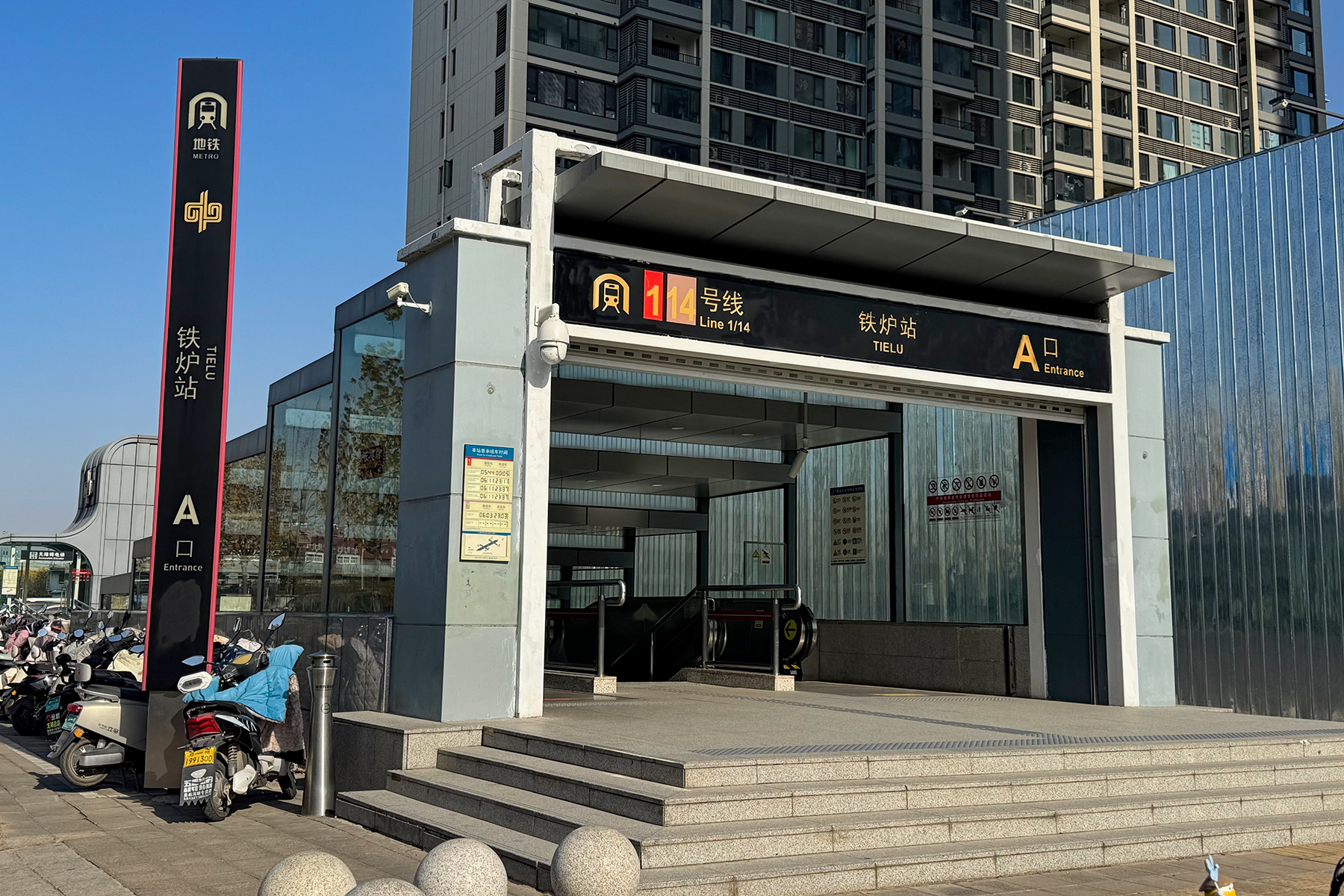

General information
- Location: Changchun Road; Zhongyuan District, Zhengzhou; China
- Coordinates: 34.7690°N 113.5346°E
- System: Zhengzhou Metro rapid transit station
- Operator: Zhengzhou Metro
- Lines: Line 1; Line 14
- Platforms: 4
- Connections: Bus

Construction
- Structure type: Underground

Other information
- Station code: 119

History
- Opened: 12 January 2017 (Line 1); 19 September 2019 (Line 14)

Services
Preceding station	Zhengzhou Metro	Following station
Lanzhai towards Henan University of Technology	Line 1	Civic Center towards New Campus of Henan University
Xushui Terminus	Line 14	Shimindadao towards Lianhu
Location
- Location within Zhengzhou

Tielu (Chinese: 铁炉) is a metro station on Line 1 and Line 14 of Zhengzhou Metro, and is the northern terminus of Line 14.

The station is approximately 1 km south of the railway station with the same name on the Longhai Railway.

== Station layout ==
The station has 2 floors underground. The B1 floor is for the station concourse and the B2 floor is for the platforms and tracks. The station has two island platforms on its B2 floor. Currently the platforms for Line 1 and Line 14 are in operation. The platforms for Line 14 are located to the west of Line 1.

G	-	Exit
B1	Concourse	Customer Service, Vending machines
B2; Platforms		← Line 1 towards Henan University of Technology (Lanzhai)
B2; Platforms	Island platform, doors will open on the left
B2; Platforms		Line 1 towards New Campus of Henan University (Civic Center) →
B2; Platforms		← Line 14 towards Xushui (Terminus)
B2; Platforms	Island platform, doors will open on the left
B2; Platforms		Line 14 towards Lianhu (Shimindadao) →

== Exits ==
Exit	Destination
Exit A	Changchun Road (east side), Zhengzhou No. 36 Middle School, The PLA No. 153 Hospital
Exit B	Changchun Road (east side), Zhengzhou No. 36 Middle School, The PLA No. 153 Hospital

== Surroundings ==
- Zhengzhou No. 36 Middle School
- The PLA No. 153 Hospital
