= Zhengzhou Daxue station =

Metro station in Zhengzhou, China

Zhengzhou Daxue 郑州大学
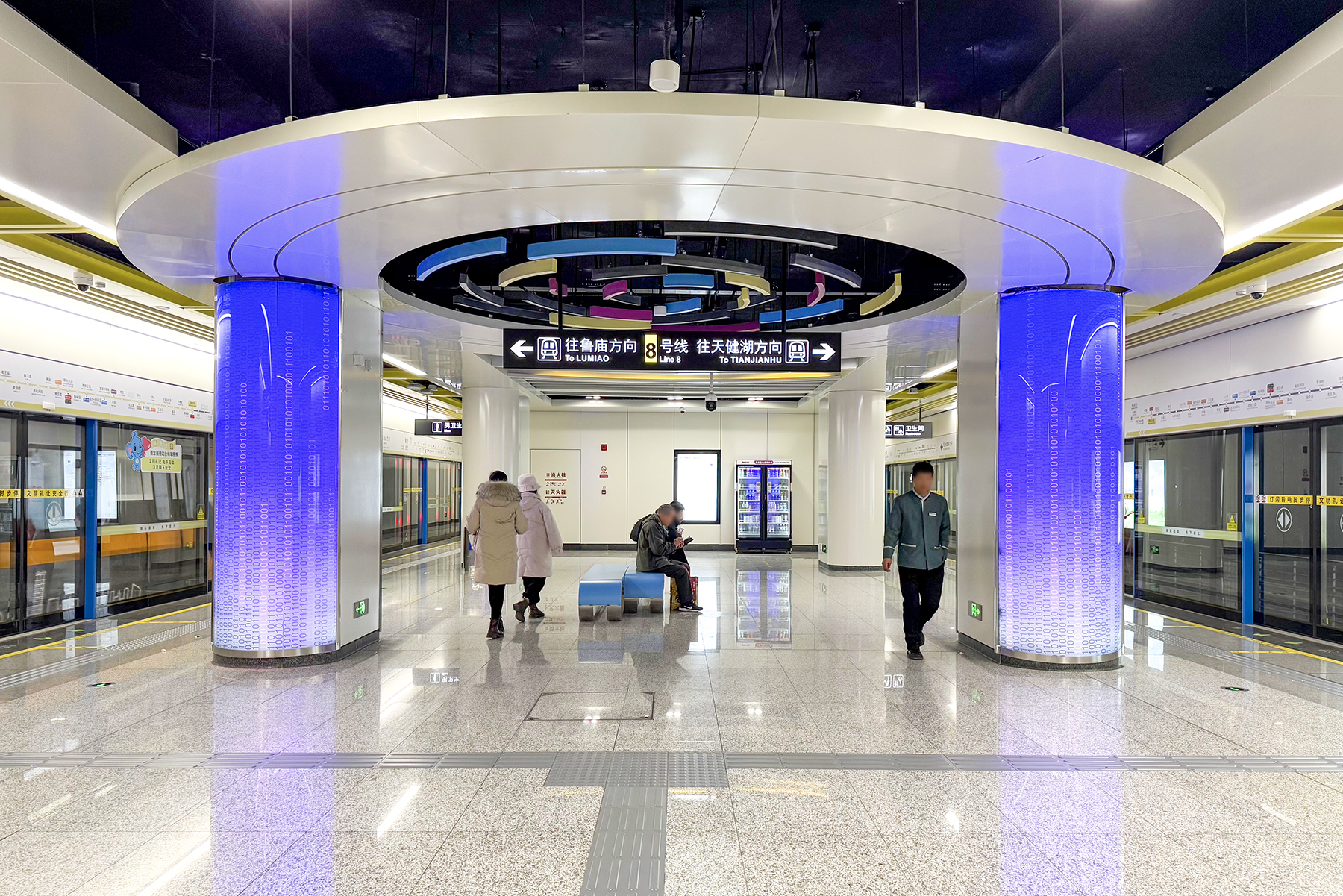
- Platforms of Line 8

General information
- Location: Changchun Road × Kexue Avenue; Zhongyuan District, Zhengzhou; China
- Coordinates: 34°48′31″N 113°32′07″E
- System: Zhengzhou Metro rapid transit station
- Operator: Zhengzhou Metro
- Lines: Line 1; Line 8
- Platforms: 4 (2 island platforms)
- Connections: Bus

Construction
- Structure type: Underground

History
- Opened: 12 January 2017
- Former names: Zhengzhou University (up to 2024)

Services
Preceding station	Zhengzhou Metro	Following station
Zhengzhou University Sci-Tech Park towards Henan University of Technology	Line 1	Wutongjie towards New Campus of Henan University
Xiangying towards Tianjianhu	Line 8	Yinping Lu towards Lumiao
Location

Zhengzhou Daxue (simplified Chinese: 郑州大学; traditional Chinese: 鄭州大學), formerly knows as Zhengzhou University, is a metro station of Line 1 and Line 8 of the Zhengzhou Metro. The station lies beneath the crossing of Changchun Road and Kexue Avenue.

== Station layout ==
The station has three floors underground. The B1 floor is a concourse. The B2 and B3 floors are platform levels. B2 floor is for Line 1 and B3 floor is for Line 8. Each of them consists of an island platform with two tracks.

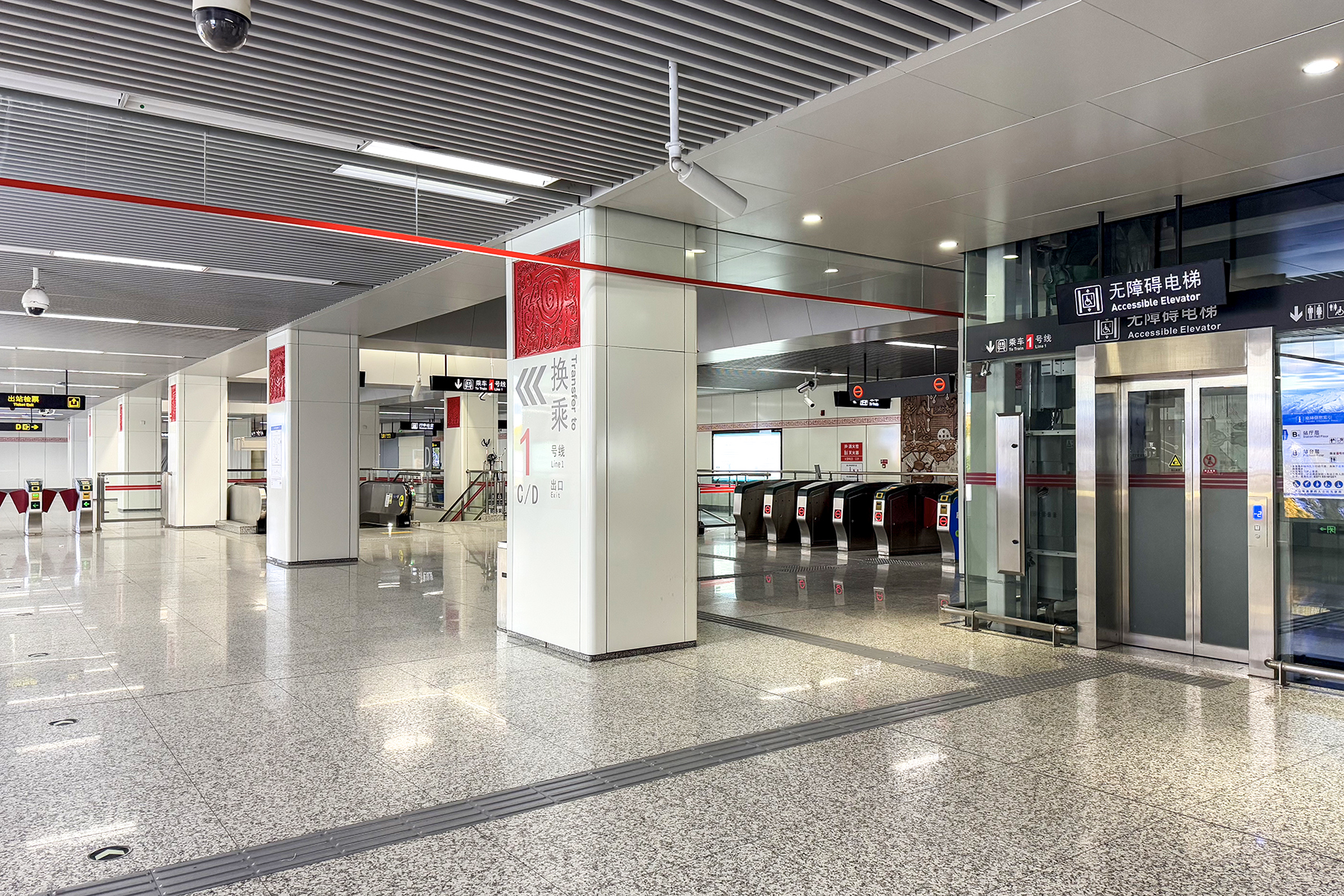
Concourse (Line 1)

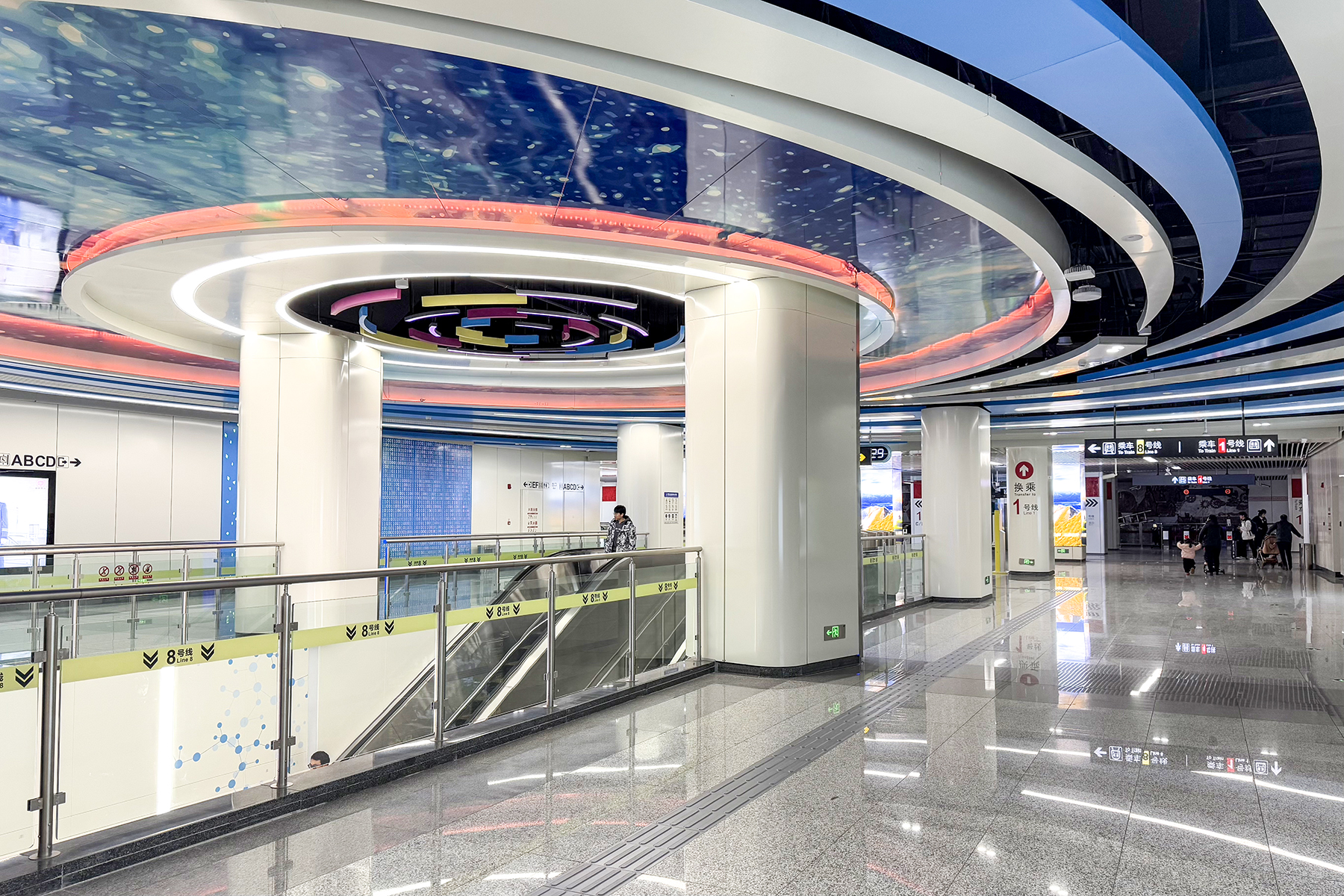
Concourse (Line 8)

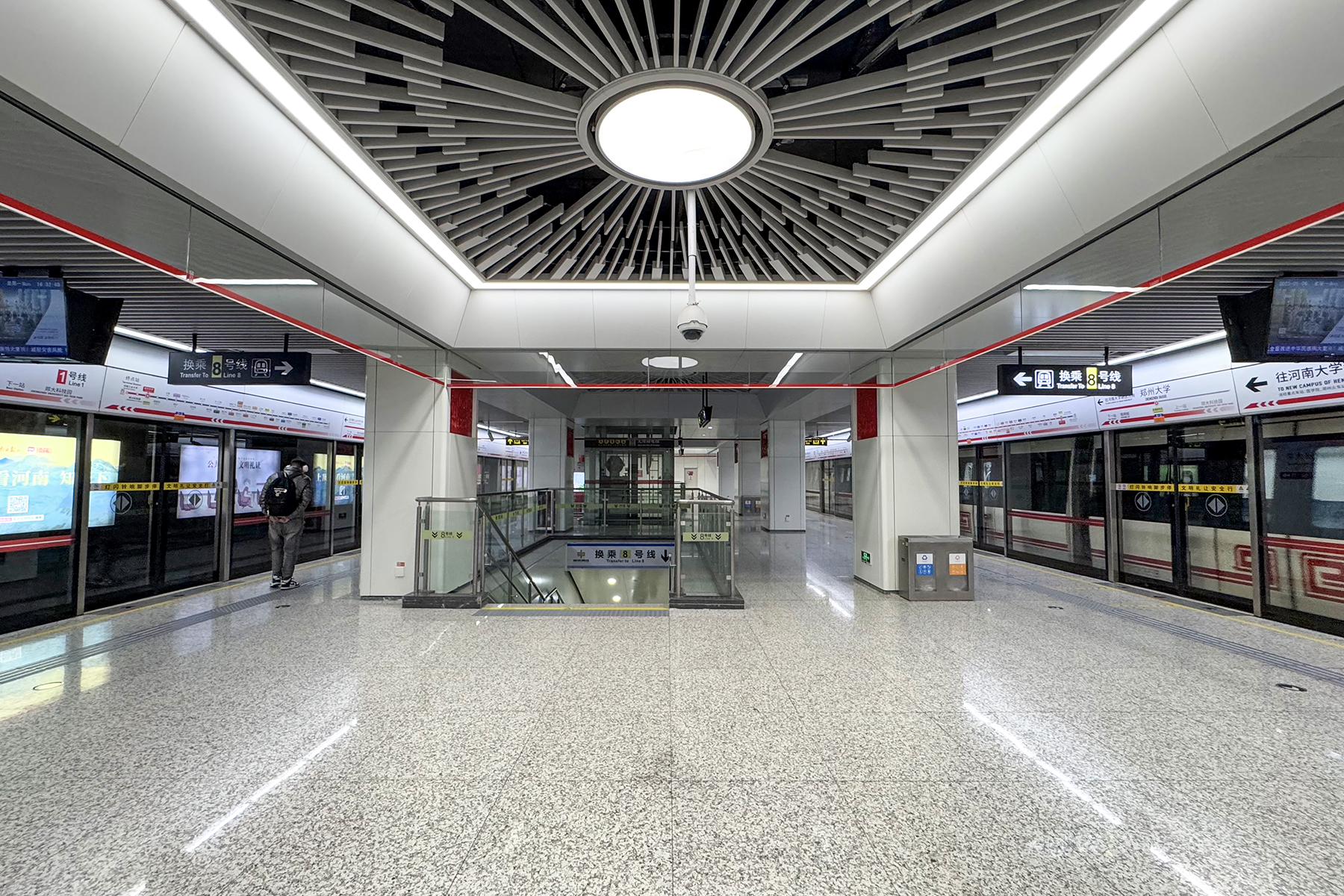
Platforms (Line 1)

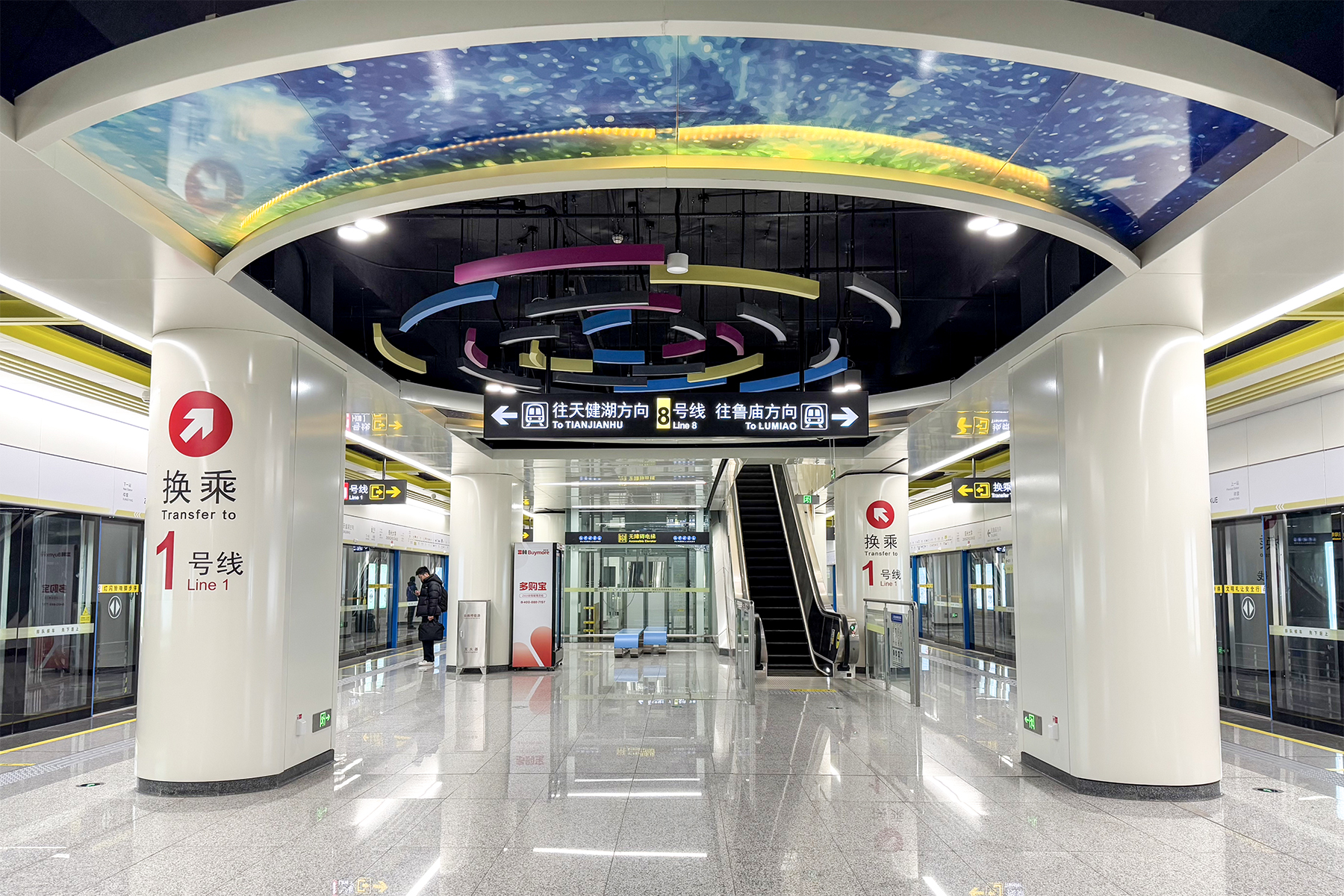
Platforms (Line 8)

== Entrances/exits ==
- A: Changchun Road (east side)
- B: Changchun Road (west side)
- C: Kexue Avenue (north side)
- D: Kexue Avenue (north side)
- E: Kexue Avenue (south side)
- F: Kexue Avenue (north side)

== Surroundings ==
- Zhengzhou University
