= Wutongjie station =

Metro station in Zhengzhou, China

Wutongjie 梧桐街
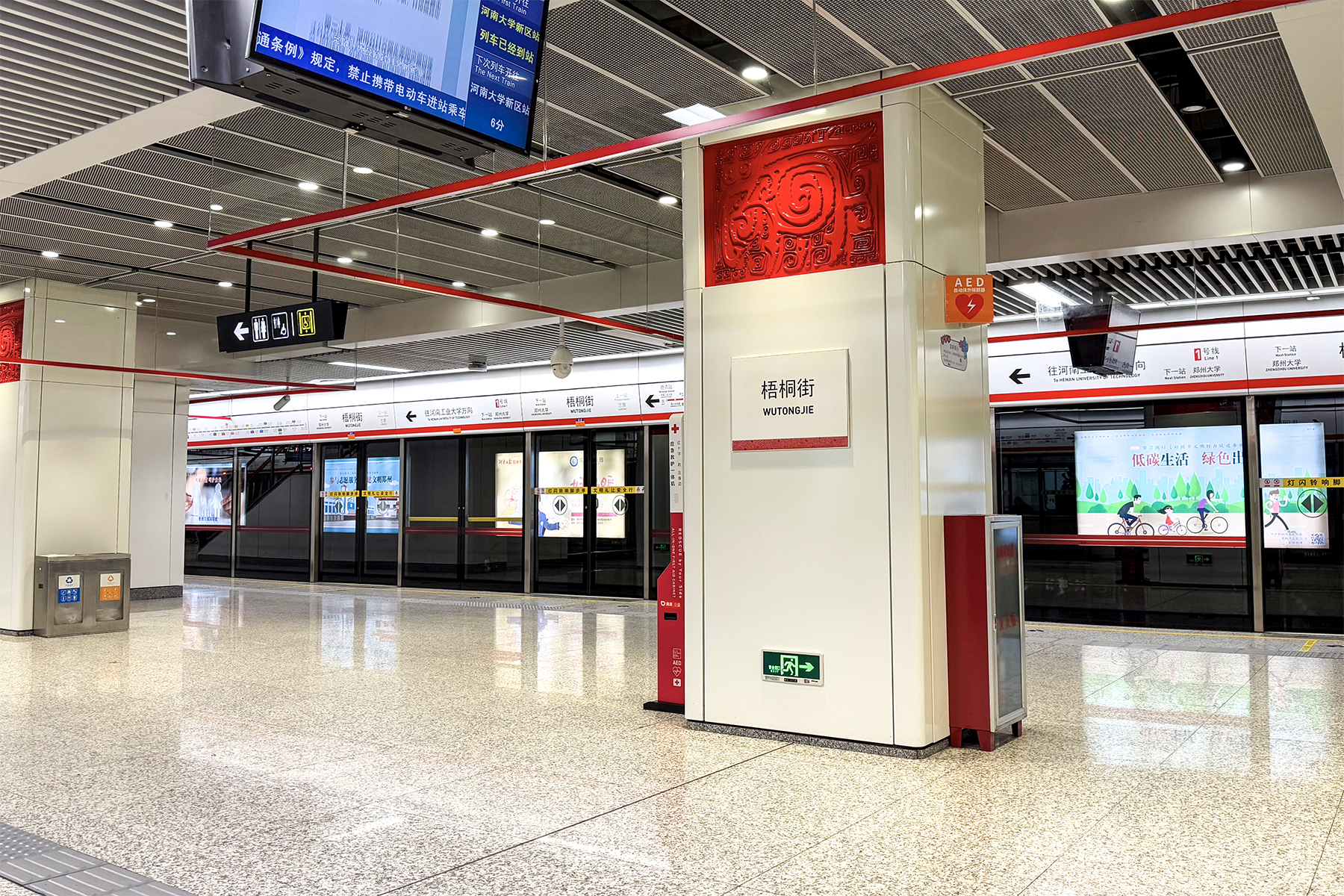

General information
- Location: Changchun Road × Wutong Street; Zhongyuan District, Zhengzhou; China
- Coordinates: 34.7953°N 113.5349°E
- System: Zhengzhou Metro rapid transit station
- Operator: Zhengzhou Metro
- Line: Line 1
- Platforms: 2 (1 island platform)
- Connections: Bus

Construction
- Structure type: Underground

Other information
- Station code: 117

History
- Opened: 12 January 2017

Services
Preceding station	Zhengzhou Metro	Following station
Zhengzhou Daxue towards Henan University of Technology	Line 1	Lanzhai towards New Campus of Henan University
Location
- Location within Zhengzhou

Wutongjie (Chinese: 梧桐街) is a metro station of Zhengzhou Metro Line 1 located beneath the crossing of Changchun Road and Wutong Street in the Zhengzhou National High & New Technology Industries Development Zone. It was opened on 12 January 2017 together with the phase II project of Line 1.

The station is named after Wutong Street.

== Station layout ==
The station has 2 floors underground. The B1 floor is for the station concourse and the B2 floor is for the platforms and tracks. The station has one island platform and two tracks for Line 1.

G	-	Exit
B1	Concourse	Customer Service, Vending machines
B2; Platforms	Platform 2	← Line 1 towards Henan University of Technology (Zhengzhou Daxue)
B2; Platforms	Island platform, doors will open on the left
B2; Platforms	Platform 1	Line 1 towards New Campus of Henan University (Lanzhai) →

== Exits ==
Exit	Destination
Exit A	Wutong Street (south side)
Exit B	Changchun Road (west side)
Exit C	Changchun Road (west side), Wutong Street (north side)
Exit D	Changchun Road (east side), Wutong Street (north side)
