= Lanzhai station =

Metro station in Zhengzhou, China

Lanzhai 兰寨
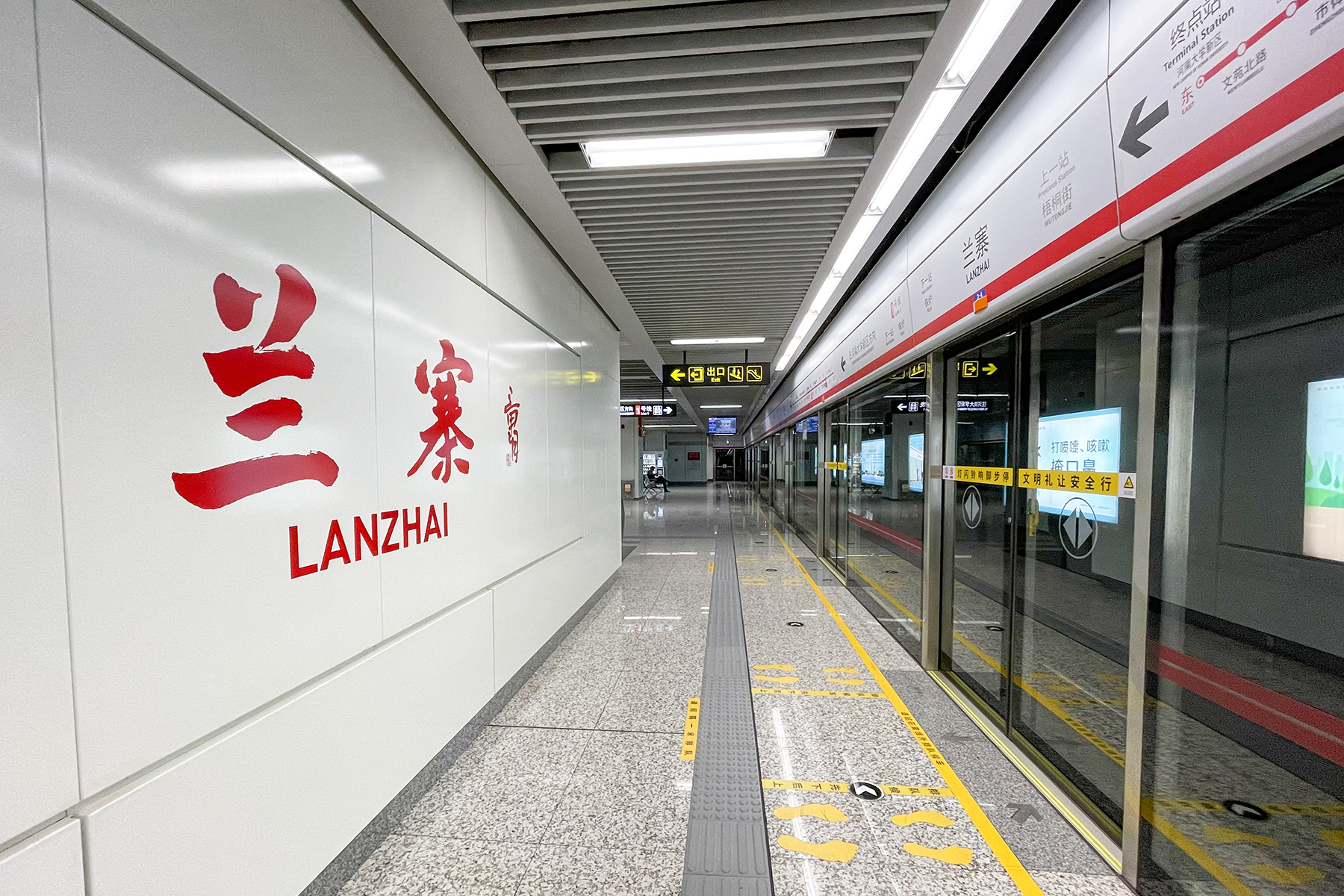

General information
- Location: Changchun Road × Huagong Road; Zhongyuan District, Zhengzhou; China
- Coordinates: 34.7845°N 113.5349°E
- System: Zhengzhou Metro rapid transit station
- Operator: Zhengzhou Metro
- Line: Line 1
- Platforms: 2 (1 island platform)
- Connections: Bus

Construction
- Structure type: Underground

Other information
- Station code: 118

History
- Opened: 12 January 2017

Services
Preceding station	Zhengzhou Metro	Following station
Wutongjie towards Henan University of Technology	Line 1	Tielu towards New Campus of Henan University
Location
- Location within Zhengzhou

Lanzhai (Chinese: 兰寨) is a metro station of Zhengzhou Metro Line 1 located beneath the crossing of Changchun Road and Huagong Road in the Zhengzhou National High & New Technology Industries Development Zone. It was opened on 12 January 2017 together with the phase II project of Line 1.

== Station layout ==
The station has 2 floors underground. The B1 floor is for the station concourse and the B2 floor is for the platforms and tracks. The station has one island platform and two tracks for Line 1.

G	-	Exit
B1	Concourse	Customer Service, Vending machines
B2; Platforms	Platform 2	← Line 1 towards Henan University of Technology (Wutongjie)
B2; Platforms	Island platform, doors will open on the left
B2; Platforms	Platform 1	Line 1 towards New Campus of Henan University (Tielu) →

== Exits ==
Exit	Destination
Exit A	Changchun Road (east side), Huagong Road (south side)
Exit B	Changchun Road (west side), Huagong Road (south side)
Exit C	Changchun Road (west side)
Exit D	Huagong Road (north side)
