= Nongyenanlu station =

Metro station in Zhengzhou, China

Nongyenanlu 农业南路
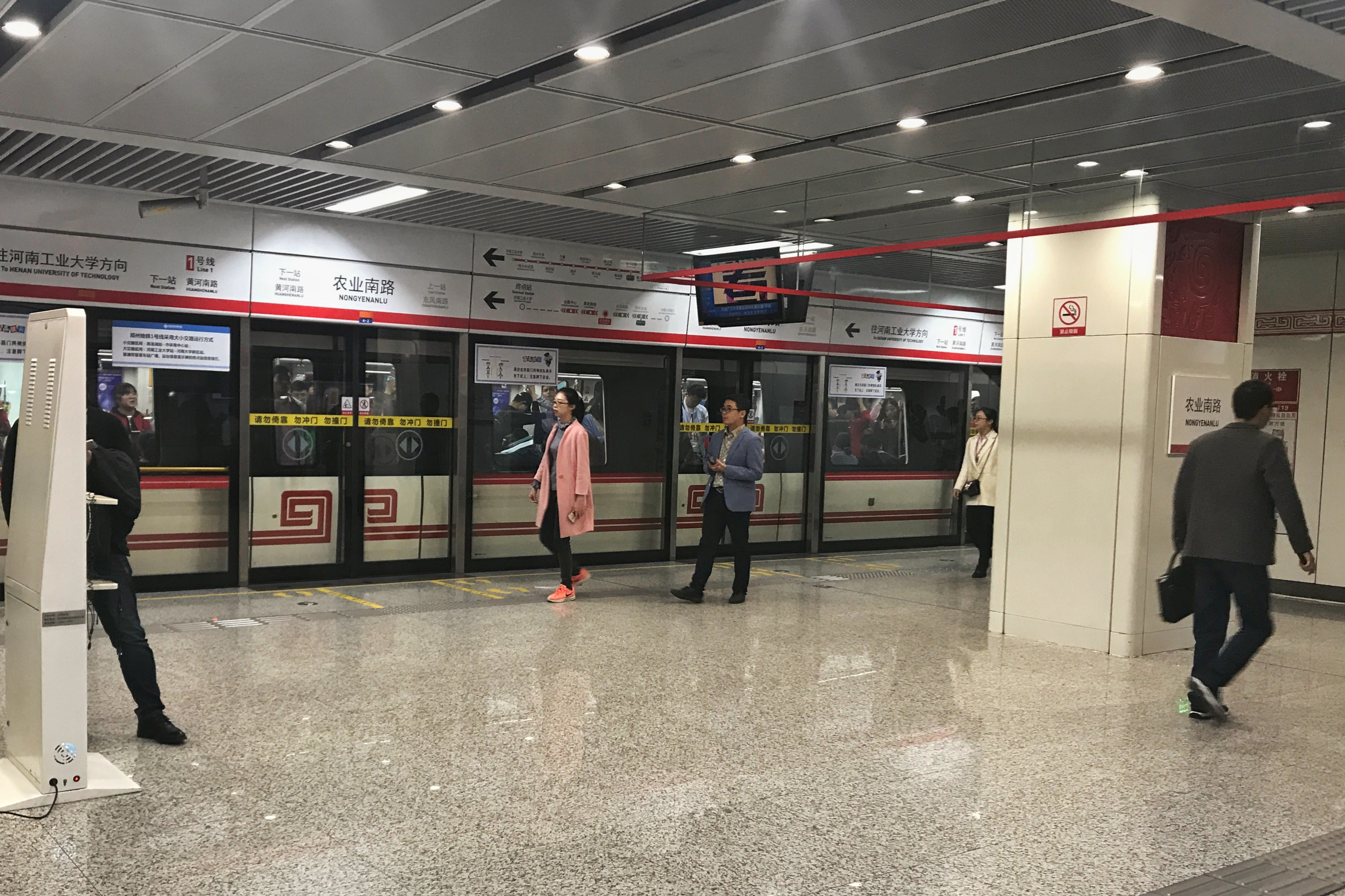

General information
- Location: Jinshui East Road × Nongye South Road; Zhengdong New Area, Zhengzhou; China
- Coordinates: 34.7663°N 113.7491°E
- System: Zhengzhou Metro rapid transit station
- Operator: Zhengzhou Metro
- Line: Line 1
- Platforms: 2 (1 island platform)
- Connections: Bus

Construction
- Structure type: Underground

Other information
- Station code: 136

History
- Opened: 28 December 2013

Services
Preceding station	Zhengzhou Metro	Following station
Huanghenanlu towards Henan University of Technology	Line 1	Dongfengnanlu towards New Campus of Henan University
Location
- Location within Zhengzhou

Nongyenanlu (Chinese: 农业南路) is a metro station of Zhengzhou Metro Line 1.

== Station layout ==
The station is a two-level underground station with a single island platform. The B1 level is for the station concourse and the B2 level is for the platforms.

G	-	Exit
B1	Concourse	Customer Service, Vending machines
B2; Platforms	Platform 2	← Line 1 towards Henan University of Technology (Huanghenanlu)
B2; Platforms	Island platform, doors will open on the left
B2; Platforms	Platform 1	Line 1 towards New Campus of Henan University (Dongfengnanlu) →

== Exits ==
Exit	Destination
Exit A	Jinshui East Road (north side), Nongye South Road (east side)
Exit B	Jinshui East Road (south side), Nongye South Road (east side)
Exit C	Jinshui East Road (south side), Nongye South Road (west side)
Exit D	Jinshui East Road (north side), Nongye South Road (west side)

== Surroundings ==
- Henan Provincial People's Government (河南省人民政府)
- Sheraton Grand Zhengzhou Hotel (郑州美盛喜来登酒店)
- Henan Geological Museum (河南省地质博物馆)
