= Dongfengnanlu station =

Metro station in Zhengzhou, China

Dongfengnanlu 东风南路
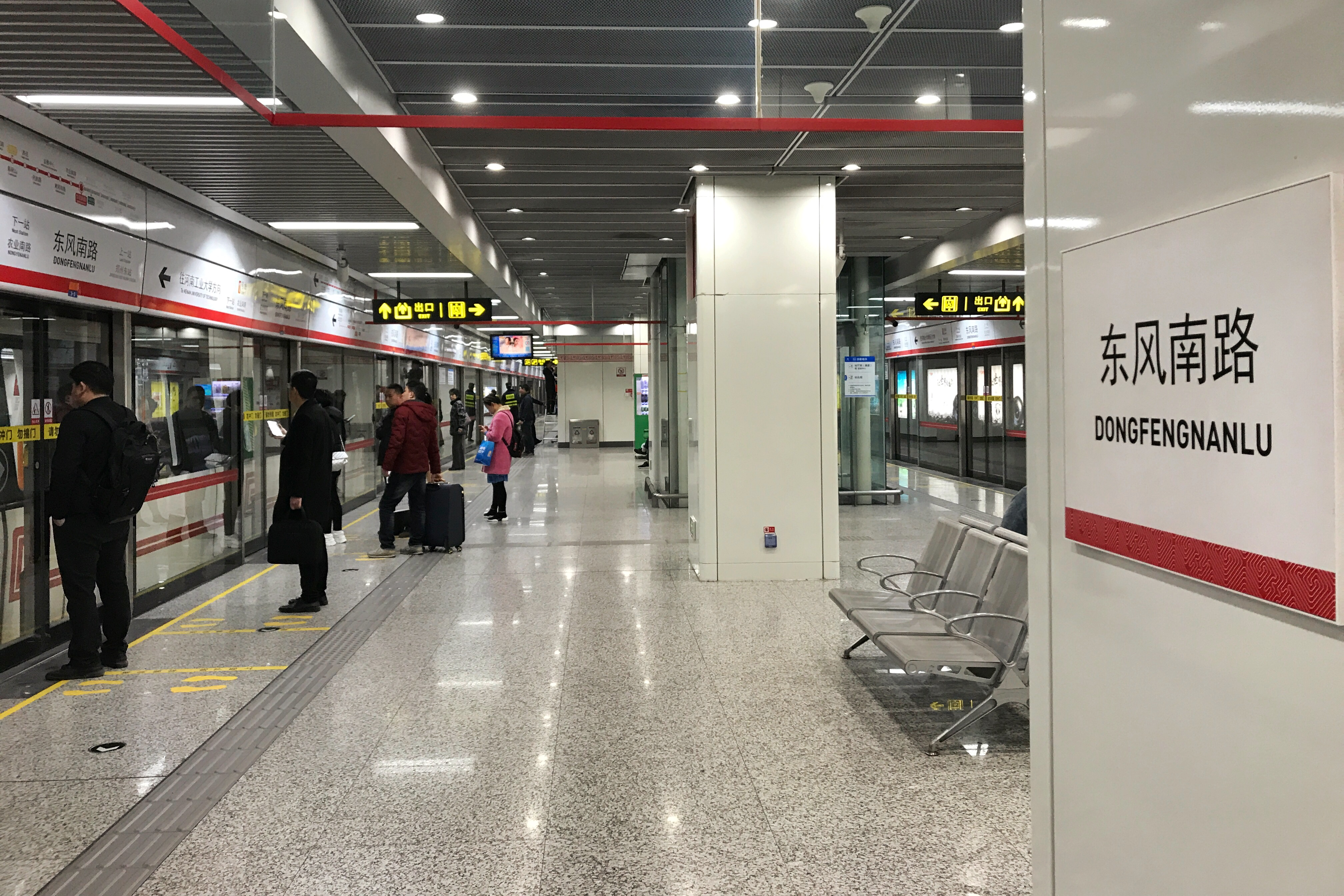

General information
- Location: Dongfeng South Road, between Xiangsheng Street and Qilihe North Road; Zhengdong New Area, Zhengzhou; China
- Coordinates: 34.7651°N 113.7606°E
- System: Zhengzhou Metro rapid transit station
- Operator: Zhengzhou Metro
- Line: Line 1
- Platforms: 2 (1 island platform)
- Connections: Bus

Construction
- Structure type: Underground

Other information
- Station code: 137

History
- Opened: 28 December 2013

Services
Preceding station	Zhengzhou Metro	Following station
Nongyenanlu towards Henan University of Technology	Line 1	Zhengzhoudong Railway Station towards New Campus of Henan University
Location
- Location within Zhengzhou

Dongfengnanlu (Chinese: 东风南路) is a metro station of Zhengzhou Metro Line 1.

== Station layout ==
The 2-level underground station has a single island platform for Line 1. The B1 level is for the station concourse and the B2 level is for the platforms.

G	-	Exit
B1	Concourse	Customer Service, Vending machines
B2; Platforms	Platform 2	← Line 1 towards Henan University of Technology (Nongyenanlu)
B2; Platforms	Island platform, doors will open on the left
B2; Platforms	Platform 1	Line 1 towards New Campus of Henan University (Zhengzhou East Railway Station) →

== Exits ==
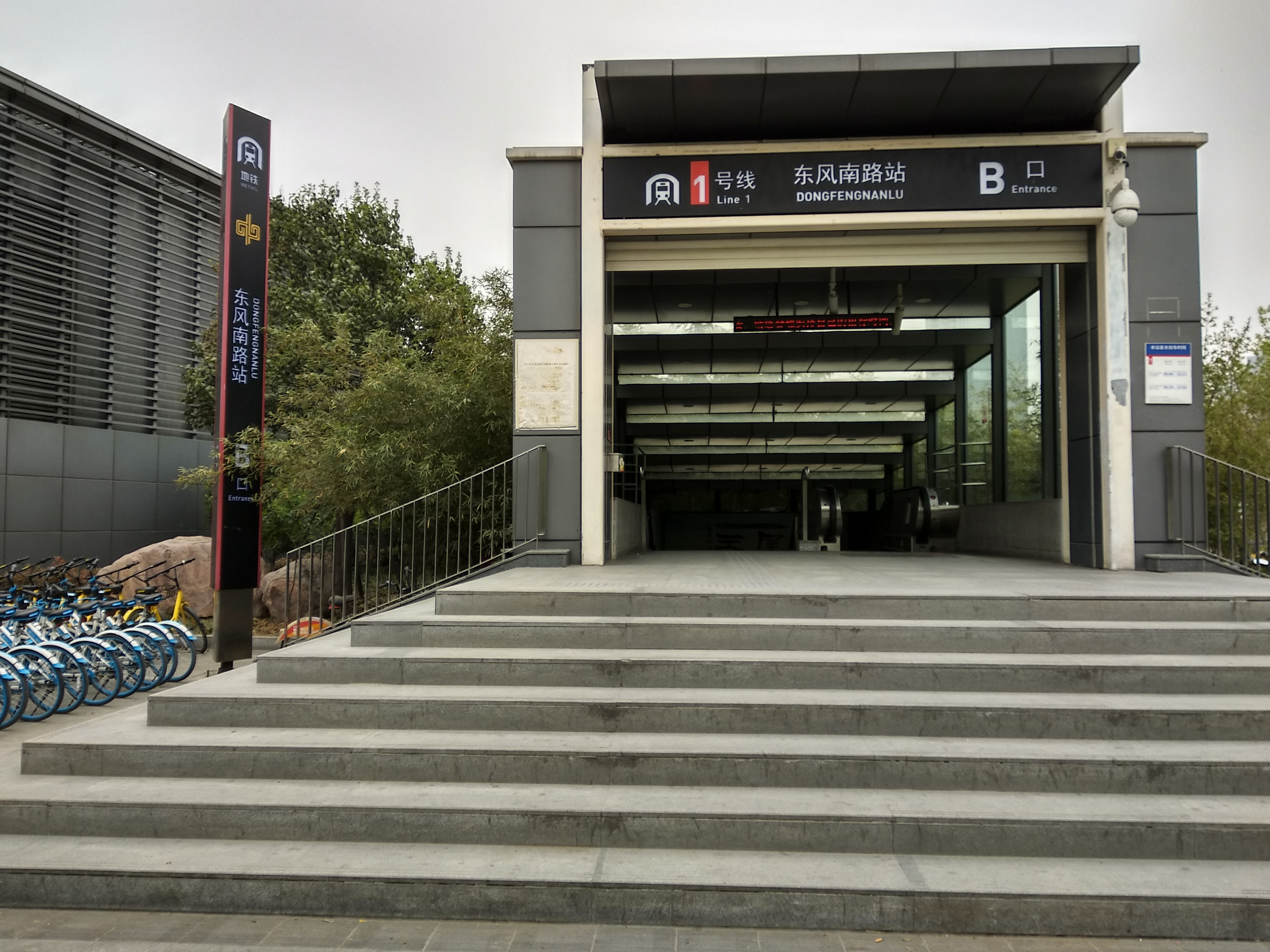
Exit B of the station

The station currently has 4 exits. Exit A, B and C are on the west side of Dongfeng South Road. Since there are many business and residential buildings on the opposite side, Exit D has been built on the east side of Dongfeng South Road.

Exit	Destination
Exit A	Dongfeng South Road (west side)
Exit B	Qilihe North Road (north side), Dongfeng South Road (west side)
Exit C	Dongfeng South Road (west side)
Exit D	Dongfeng South Road (east side), Xiangsheng Street (south side)
