= Zhengzhou University Sci-Tech Park station =

Metro station in Zhengzhou, China

Zhengzhou University Sci-Tech Park 郑大科技园
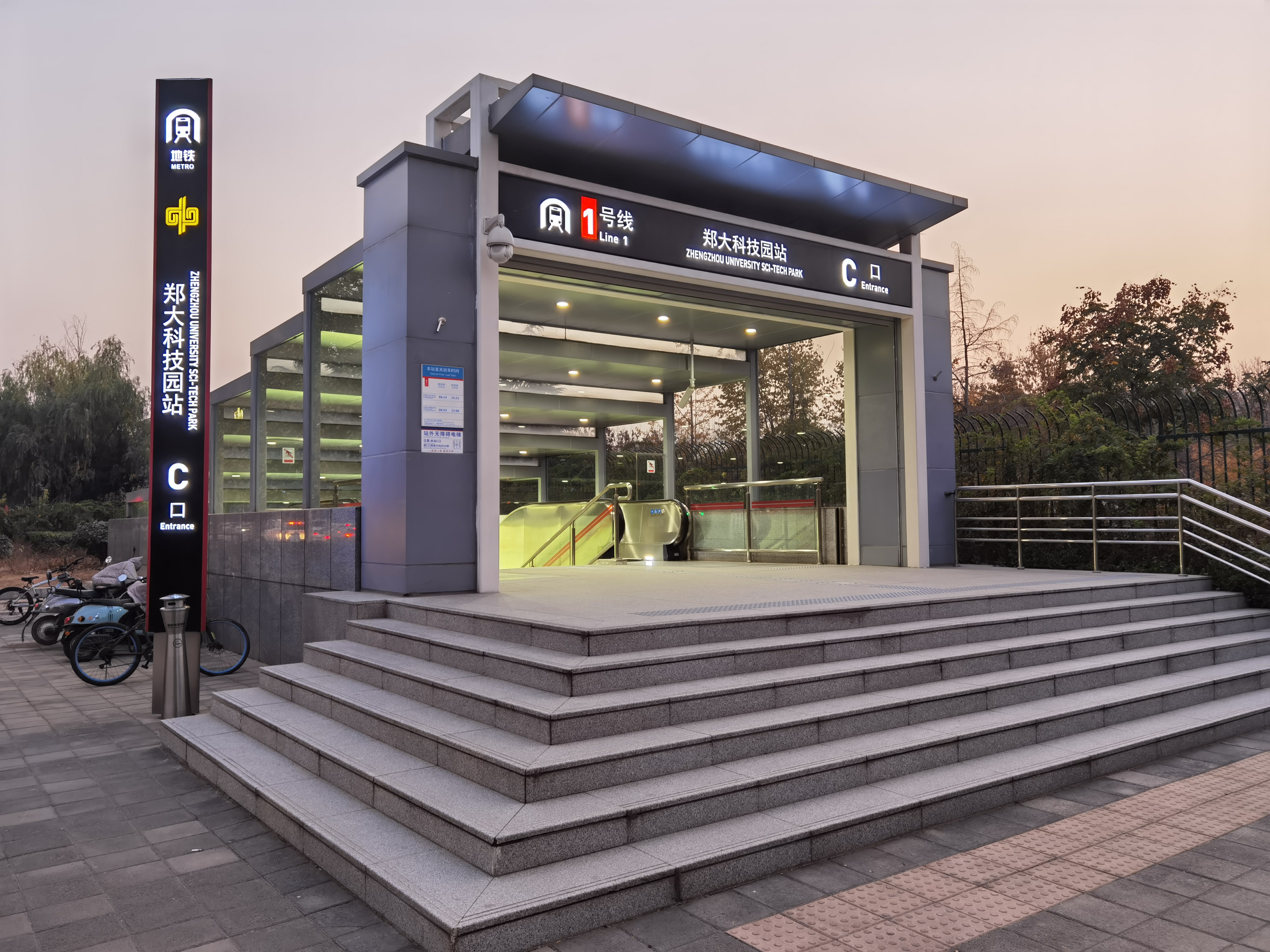
- Entrance C

General information
- Location: Changchun Road × Cuizhu Street; Zhongyuan District, Zhengzhou; China
- Coordinates: 34.8180°N 113.5356°E
- System: Zhengzhou Metro rapid transit station
- Operator: Zhengzhou Metro
- Line: Line 1
- Platforms: 2 (1 island platform)
- Connections: Bus

Construction
- Structure type: Underground

Other information
- Station code: 115

History
- Opened: 12 January 2017

Services
| Preceding station | Zhengzhou Metro | Following station |
|---|---|---|
| Henan University of Technology Terminus | Line 1 | Zhengzhou Daxue towards New Campus of Henan University |
Location
- Location within Zhengzhou

Zhengzhou University Sci-Tech Park (Chinese: 郑大科技园) is a station of Phase II of Line 1, Zhengzhou Metro. The station started construction in February 2014 and was put into service at January 2017 with the beginning of trial operation of Phase II. This station lies beneath the crossing of Changchun Road (长椿路) and Cuizhu Street (翠竹街), outside the east gate of Zhengzhou University (new campus).

== Station layout ==
The station has 2 floors underground. The B1 floor is for the station concourse and the B2 floor is for the platforms and tracks. The station has one island platform and two tracks for Line 1.

| G | - | Exit |
| B1 | Concourse | Customer Service, Vending machines |
| B2; Platforms | Platform 2 | ← Line 1 towards Henan University of Technology (Terminus) |
| B2; Platforms | Island platform, doors will open on the left |
| B2; Platforms | Platform 1 | Line 1 towards New Campus of Henan University (Zhengzhou Daxue) → |

== Exits ==
There are 4 exits serving this station - A and D lies on the south and the north side of Cuizhu Street while B and C lies with the same order of the east gate of Zhengzhou University.

| Exit | Destination | Bus connections |
|---|---|---|
| Exit A | Changchun Road (east side) | 271, S151 |
| Exit B | Changchun Road (west side), East gate of Zhengzhou University | S151 |
| Exit C | Changchun Road (west side), East gate of Zhengzhou University | 271 |
| Exit D | Cuizhu Street (north side) | 271, S151 |

== Surrounding sites ==
- Zhengzhou University (new campus)
- Zhengzhou University Sci-tech Park
- Experimental Primary School of Zhengzhou University
- Zhengzhou Machinery Research Institute
