= Convention and Exhibition Center station (Zhengzhou Metro) =

Metro station in Zhengzhou, China

Convention and Exhibition Center 会展中心
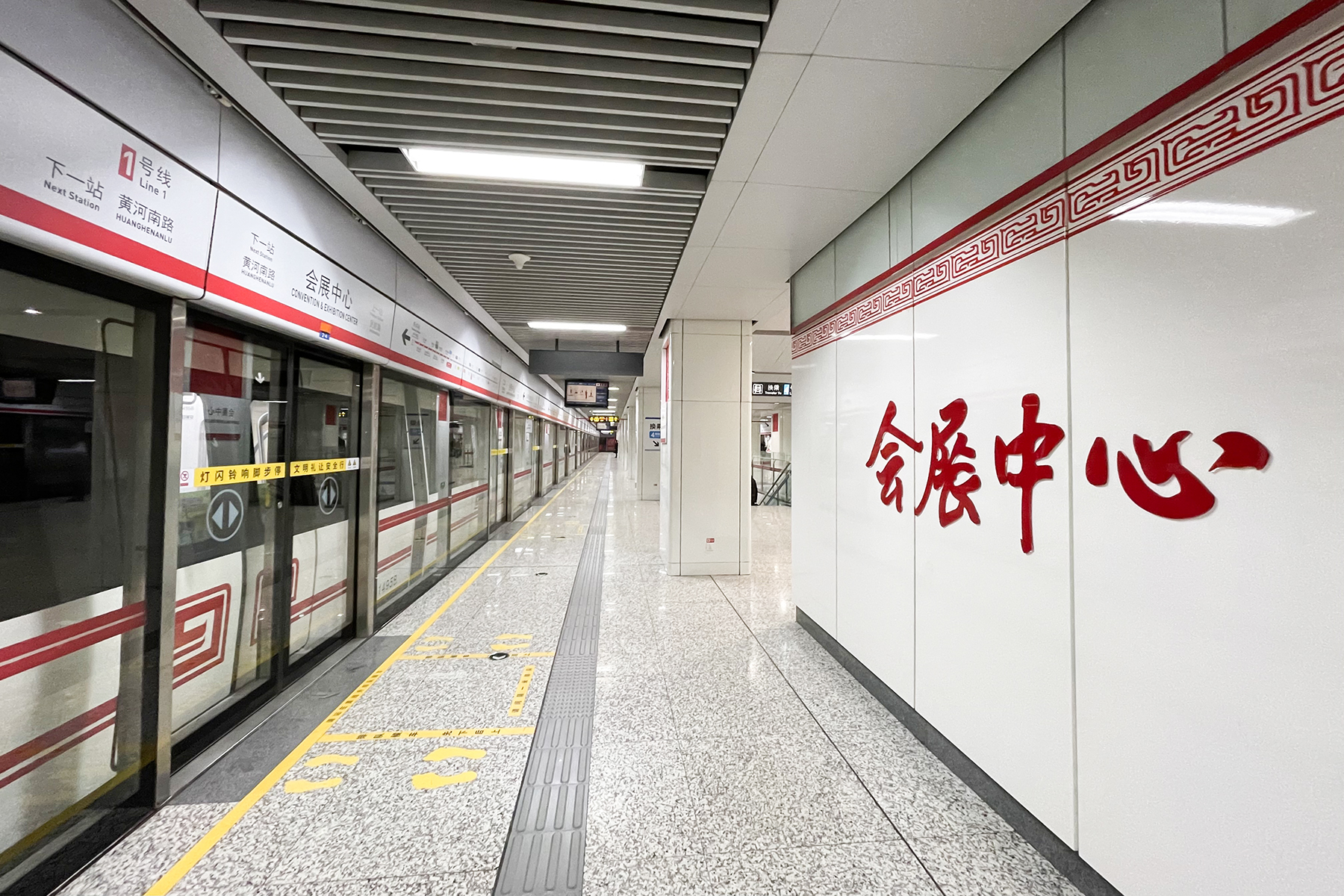
- Platforms of Line 1

General information
- Location: CBD (near Shangwu West 8 Street); Zhengdong New Area, Zhengzhou; China
- Coordinates: 34.7673°N 113.7194°E
- System: Zhengzhou Metro rapid transit station
- Operator: Zhengzhou Metro
- Lines: Line 1; Line 4
- Platforms: 4 (2 island platforms)
- Connections: Bus

Construction
- Structure type: Underground

Other information
- Station code: 134

History
- Opened: 28 December 2013

Services
Preceding station	Zhengzhou Metro	Following station
Minhanglu towards Henan University of Technology	Line 1	Huanghenanlu towards New Campus of Henan University
Central Business District towards Laoyachen	Line 4	Shangdinglu towards Langzhuang
Location
- Location within Zhengzhou

Convention and Exhibition Center (Chinese: 会展中心) is a metro station on Line 1 and Line 4 of the Zhengzhou Metro.

== Station layout ==
The station is a 3-level underground station with two island platforms. The station concourse is on the B1 level and levels B2 and B3 is for the platforms.

G	-	Exit
B1	Concourse	Customer Service, Vending machines
B2; Platforms	Platform 2	← Line 1 towards Henan University of Technology (Minhanglu)
B2; Platforms	Island platform, doors will open on the left
B2; Platforms	Platform 1	Line 1 towards New Campus of Henan University (Huanghenanlu) →

== Exits ==
Exit	Destination
Exit A	Shangwu Outer Ring Road
Exit B1	Shangwu Outer Ring Road
Exit C2	Shangwu West 8 Street

== Surroundings ==
- ZZICEC (郑州国际会展中心)
- Zhengzhou Greenland Plaza (绿地中心·千玺广场)
- Dennis Midtown 7 (丹尼斯7天地)
