= Route 14 =

Route 14 may refer to:

- One of several highways - see List of highways numbered 14
- One of several public transport routes - see List of public transport routes numbered 14
