= Line 14 =

Line 14 may refer to:

== Asia ==
- Line 14 (Beijing Subway), China
- Line 14 (Guangzhou Metro), China
- Line 14 (Mumbai Metro), India (planned)
- Line 14 (Shanghai Metro), China
- Line 14 (Shenzhen Metro), China
- Line 14 (Xi'an Metro), China
- Line 14 (Zhengzhou Metro), China

== Europe ==
- Line 14 (Moscow Metro), or Moscow Central Circle, Russia
- Line 14, part of the Red Line (Stockholm Metro), in Sweden
- Paris Metro Line 14, France
- Paris Metro Line 14 (1937–1976), France
- S14 (ZVV), Zurich, Switzerland

== North America ==
- Line 14 (BMT), now part of New York City Subway service J/Z
- Candiac line, also designated as line 14, a commuter rail service in Greater Montreal, Quebec

== South America ==
- Line 14 (CPTM), São Paulo, Brazil

== See also ==
- List of public transport routes numbered 14
