= Yanzhuang station =

Metro station in Zhengzhou, China

Yanzhuang 燕庄
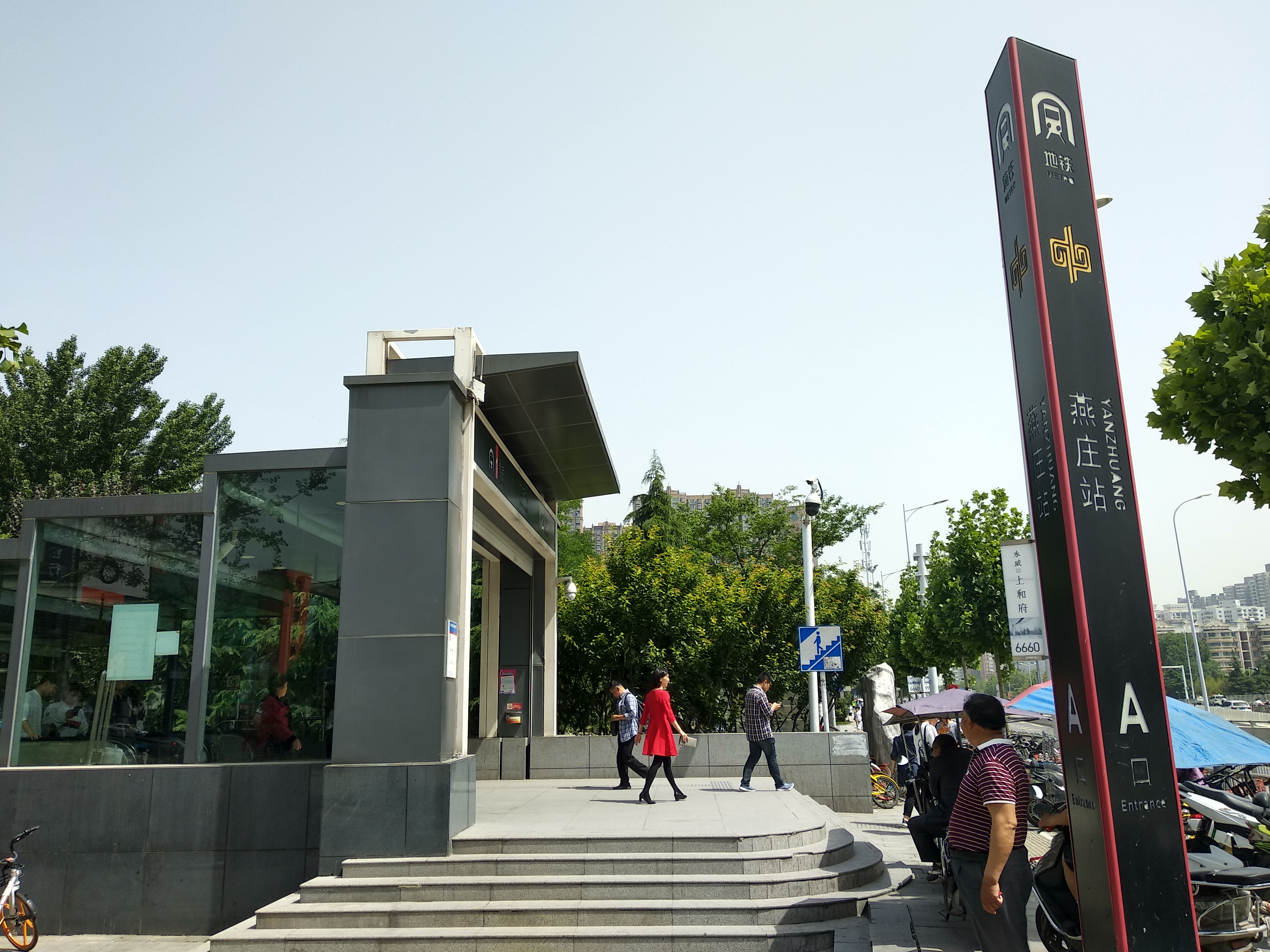
- Entrance A of Yanzhuang station

General information
- Location: Jinshui Road × Weilai Road; Jinshui District, Zhengzhou; China
- Coordinates: 34.7643°N 113.6973°E
- System: Zhengzhou Metro rapid transit station
- Operator: Zhengzhou Metro
- Lines: Line 1; Line 6
- Platforms: 4 (2 island platforms)
- Connections: Bus

Construction
- Structure type: Underground

Other information
- Station code: 132 (Line 1); 627 (Line 6)

History
- Opened: 28 December 2013

Services
| Preceding station | Zhengzhou Metro | Following station |
|---|---|---|
| Zijingshan towards Henan University of Technology | Line 1 | Minhanglu towards New Campus of Henan University |
| Bolan Zhongxin towards Jiayu | Line 6 | Yaozhai towards Qinghua Fuzhong |
Location
- Location within Zhengzhou

Yanzhuang (Chinese: 燕庄) is a metro station of Line 1 and Line 6 of the Zhengzhou Metro.

== Station layout ==
The station has 3 floors underground. The B2 floor is for the station concourse and the B3 floor is for the platforms and tracks. The station has one island platform and two tracks for Line 1.

| G | - | Exits |
| B2 | Concourse | Customer Service, Vending machines |
| B3; Platforms | Platform 2 | ← Line 1 towards Henan University of Technology (Zijingshan) |
| B3; Platforms | Island platform, doors will open on the left |
| B3; Platforms | Platform 1 | Line 1 towards New Campus of Henan University (Minhanglu) → |

== Exits ==
| Exit | Destination | Bus connections |
|---|---|---|
| Exit A | Jinshui Road (north side), Weilai Road (west side), Yanzhuang Plaza | |
| Exit B1 | Jinshui Road (south side), Weilai Road (west side) | |
| Exit B2 | Jinshui Road (south side), Weilai Road (east side) | 26, 43, 115, 122, 916, 919, B18, S126; Night services: Y13, Y31 |
| Exit C | Jinshui Road (south side) | |
| Exit D | Jinshui Road (north side), Yanzhuang Plaza | 122, 916; Night services: Y13, Y31 |

== Surroundings ==
- Yanzhuang Plaza (燕庄广场)
- Shenglong Building (升龙大厦)
- Hilton Zhengzhou (希尔顿酒店)
- Manhattan Commercial Center (曼哈顿商业中心)
- The 3rd Affiliated Hospital of HUTCM (河南中医药大学第三附属医院)
