= Huanghenan Lu station =

Metro station in Zhengzhou, China

Huanghenan Lu 黄河南路
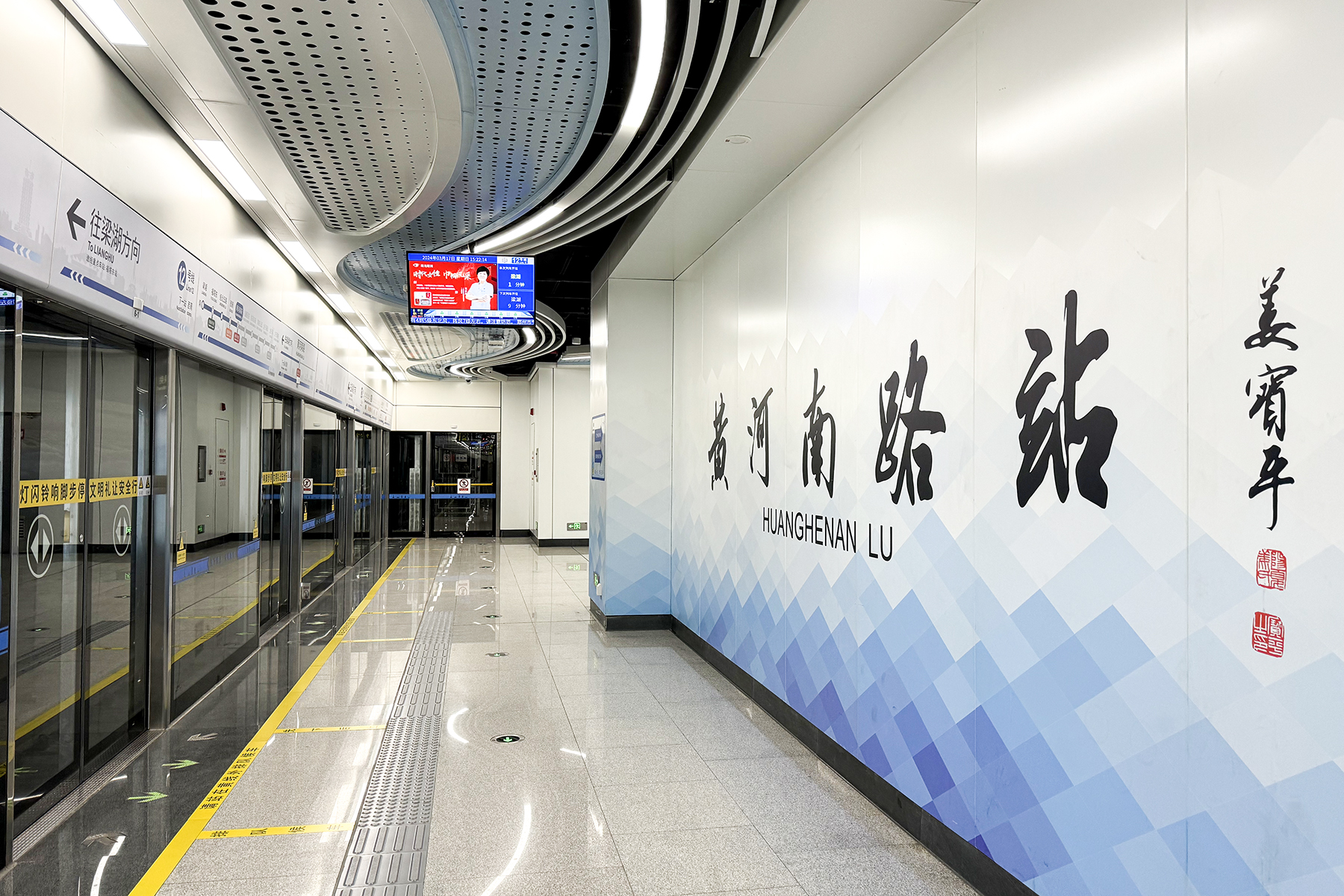
- Platform of Line 12

General information
- Location: Jinshui East Road × Huanghe South Road; Zhengdong New Area, Zhengzhou; China
- Coordinates: 34°45′50″N 113°44′18″E
- System: Zhengzhou Metro rapid transit station
- Operator: Zhengzhou Metro
- Lines: Line 1; Line 12
- Platforms: 4 (2 island platforms)
- Connections: Bus

Construction
- Structure type: Underground

History
- Opened: 28 December 2013
- Former names: South Huanghe Road (up to 2017)

Services
| Preceding station | Zhengzhou Metro | Following station |
|---|---|---|
| Convention and Exhibition Center towards Henan University of Technology | Line 1 | Nongyenanlu towards New Campus of Henan University |
| Children's Hospital towards Lianghu | Line 12 | Xizhou towards Longzihu Dong |
Location

Huanghenan Lu (simplified Chinese: 黄河南路; traditional Chinese: 黃河南路), formerly known as South Huanghe Road, is a metro station of Zhengzhou Metro Line 1 and Line 12.

== Station layout ==
Huanghenan Lu has three floors. B1 floor is the concourse, B2 and B3 floors are platform levels. B2 floor is for Line 1 and B3 floor is for Line 12. Each of them consists of an island platform with two tracks.

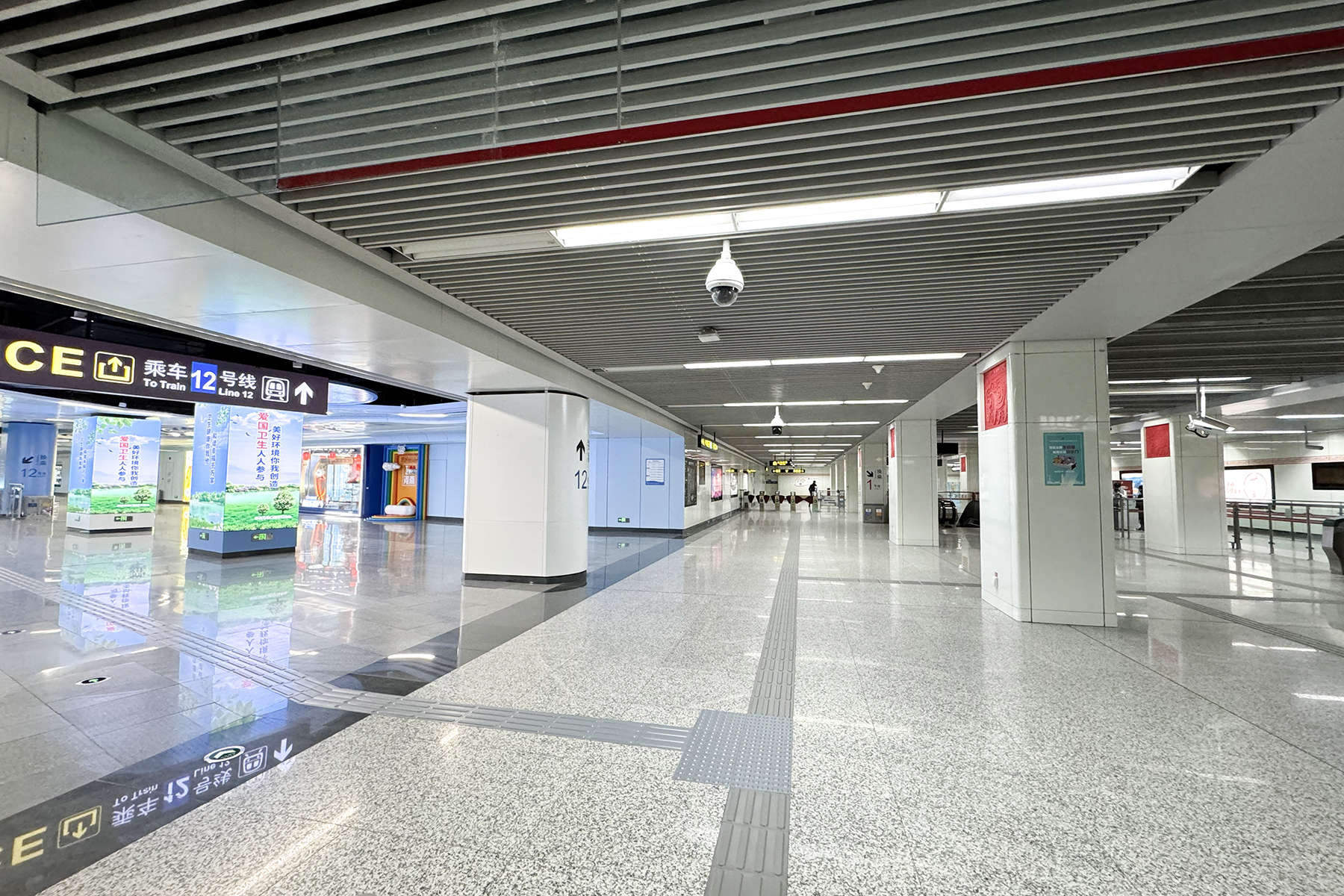
Concourse of Line 1 (right)

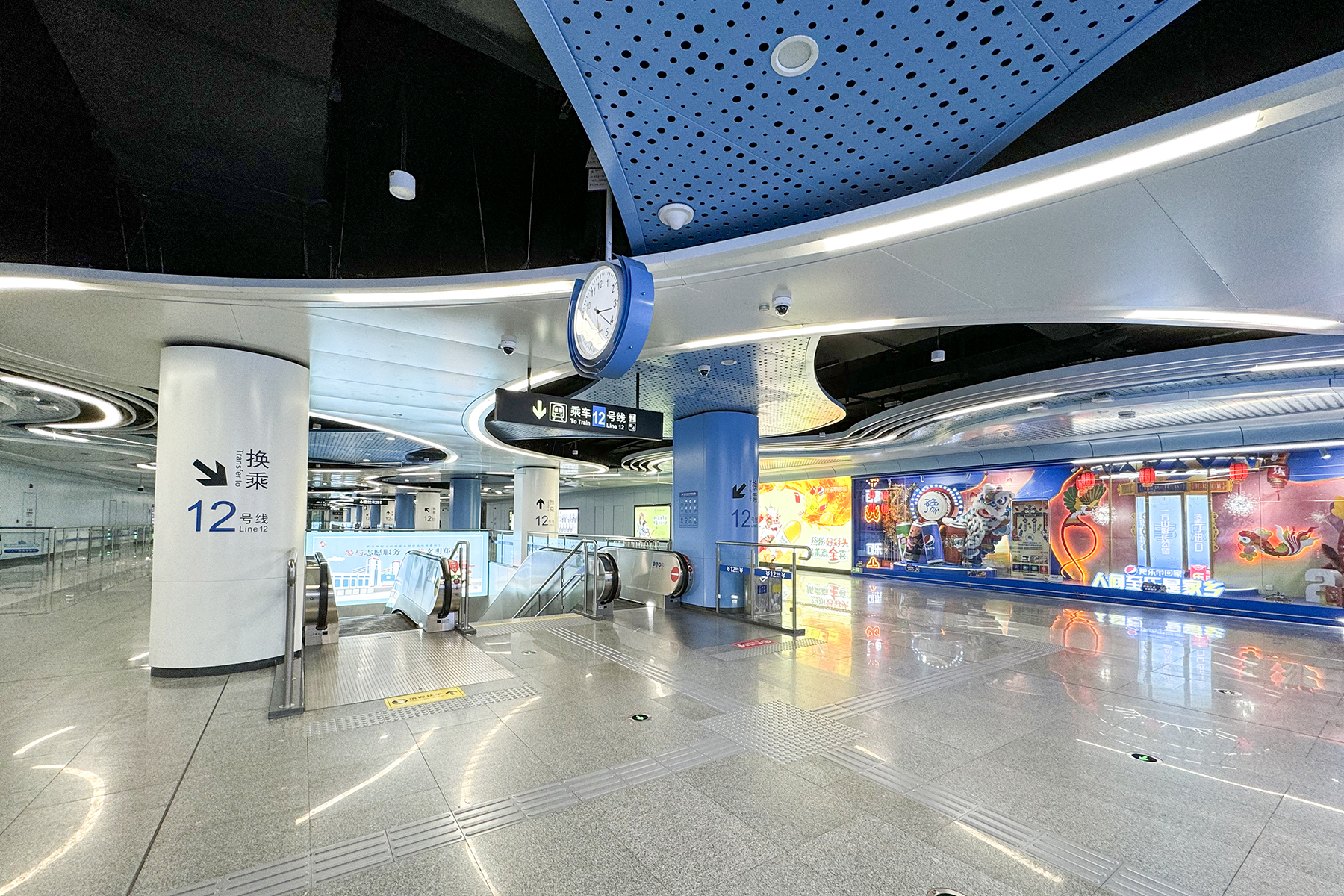
Concourse of Line 12

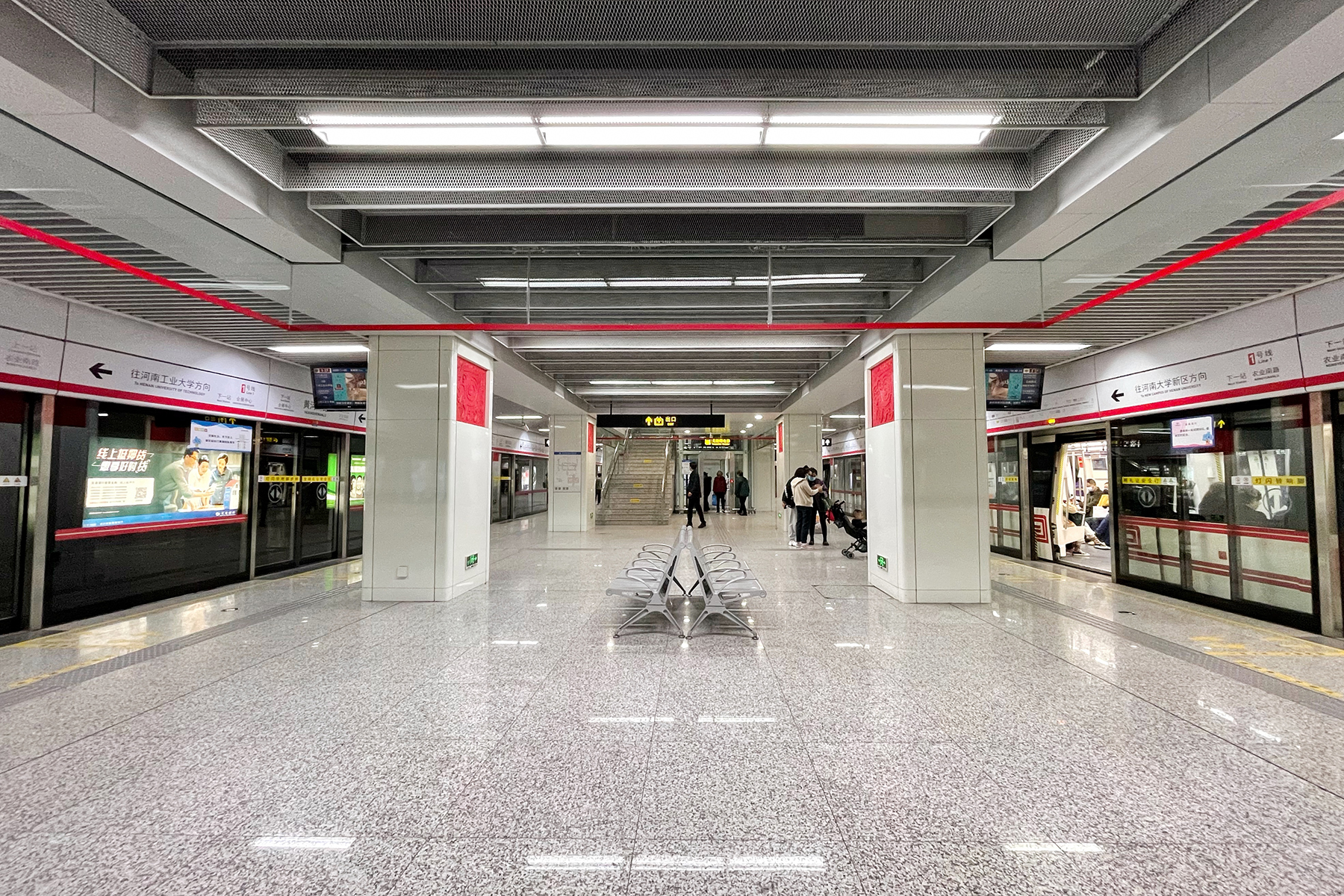
Platforms of Line 1

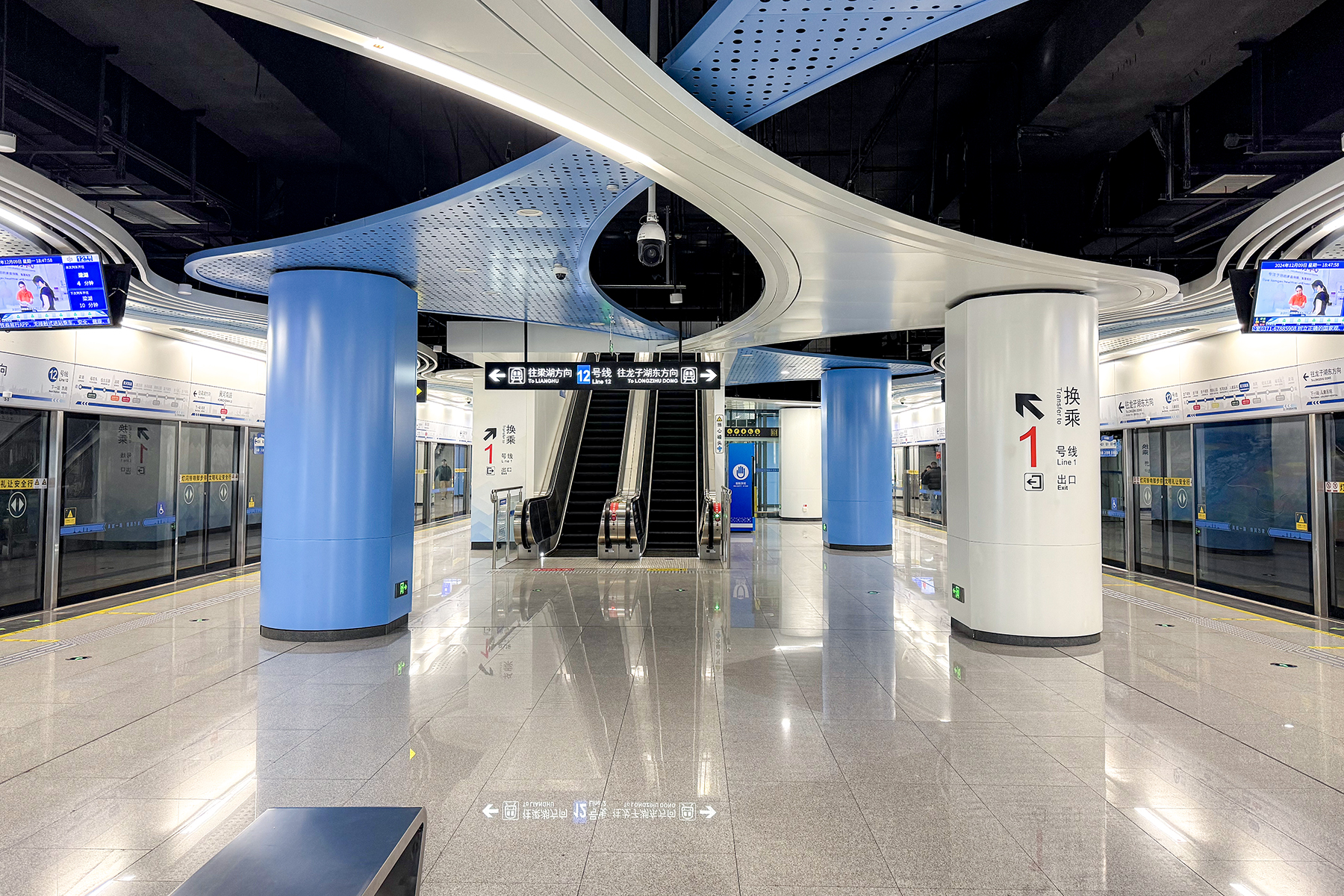
Platforms of Line 12

=== Entrances/exits ===
- A: Jinshui East Road (north side)
- B1 & B2: Huanghe South Road (east side), Jinshui East Road (south side)
- C1 & C2: Huanghe South Road (west side), Jinshui East Road (south side)
- D: : Huanghe South Road (west side), Jinshui East Road (north side)
- E: Huanghe South Road (east side)

== Surroundings ==
- Henan Geological Museum (河南省地质博物馆)
