= Minhanglu station =

Metro station in Zhengzhou, China

Minhanglu 民航路
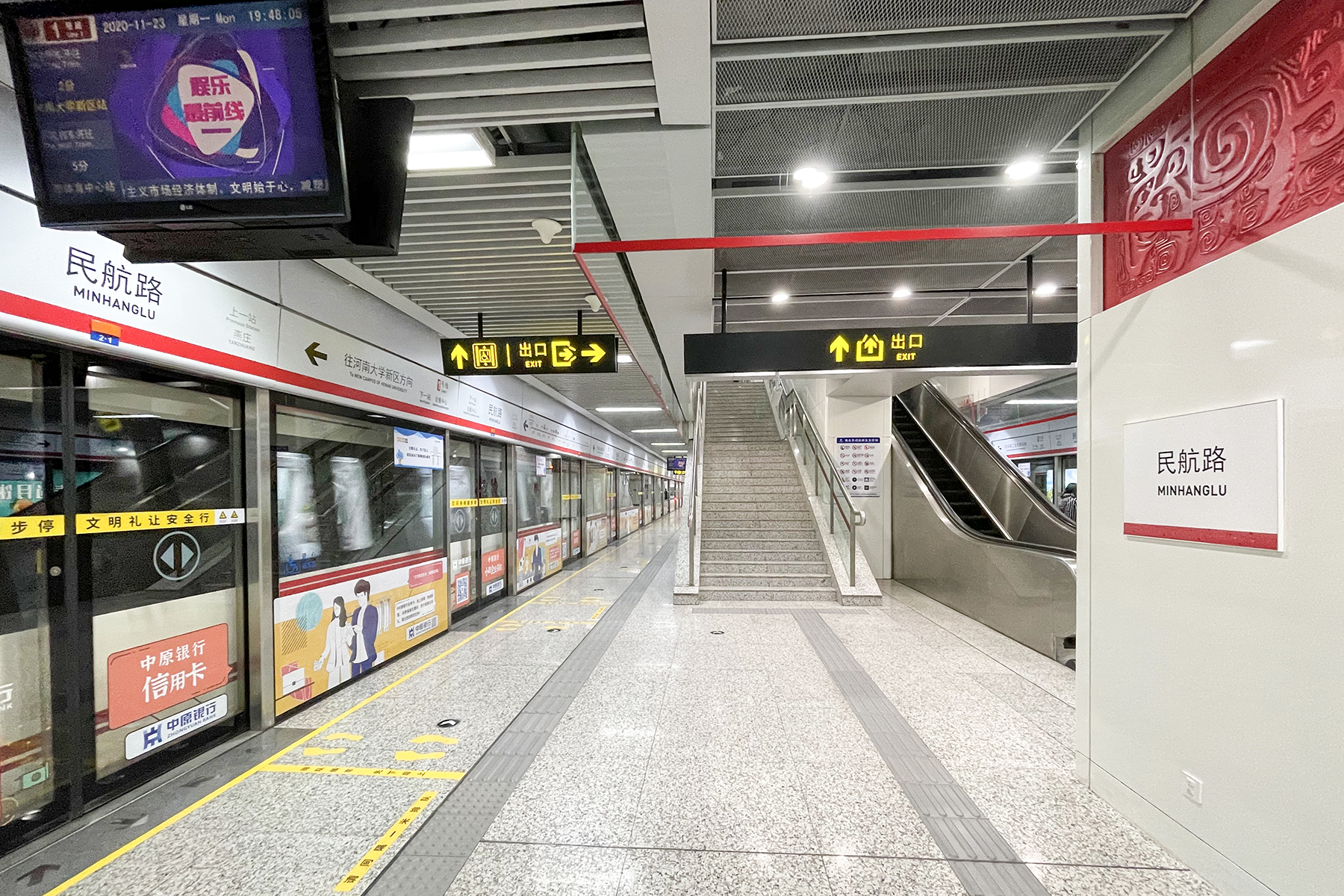

General information
- Location: Minhang Road; Jinshui District, Zhengzhou; China
- Coordinates: 34.7639°N 113.7076°E
- System: Zhengzhou Metro rapid transit station
- Operator: Zhengzhou Metro
- Line: Line 1
- Platforms: 2 (1 island platform)
- Connections: Bus

Construction
- Structure type: Underground

Other information
- Station code: 133

History
- Opened: 28 December 2013

Services
Preceding station	Zhengzhou Metro	Following station
Yanzhuang towards Henan University of Technology	Line 1	Convention and Exhibition Center towards New Campus of Henan University
Location
- Location within Zhengzhou

Minhanglu (Chinese: 民航路) is a metro station of Zhengzhou Metro Line 1.

== Station layout ==
The station has 2 levels underground. The B1 level is for the station concourse where the customer service center, ticket vending machines and security checks are located. The single island platform for Line 1 is on the B2 level.

G	-	Exit
B1	Concourse	Customer Service, Vending machines
B2; Platforms	Platform 2	← Line 1 towards Henan University of Technology (Yanzhuang)
B2; Platforms	Island platform, doors will open on the left
B2; Platforms	Platform 1	Line 1 towards New Campus of Henan University (Convention and Exhibition Center) →

== Exits ==
Exit	Destination	Bus connections
Exit F1	Jinshui Road (north side), Minhang Road (south side)	26, 43, 115, 122, 916, 919, B18, S126; Night services: Y13, Y31
Exit F3	Jinshui Road (south side)	26, 43, 115, 122, 916, 919, B18, S126, S127; Night services: Y13, Y31
Exit H	Minhang Road	

== Surroundings ==
- Jianguo Hotel (建国饭店)
- Henan High Court (河南省高级人民法院)
- Mingmen City Plaza (名门城市广场)
