= Line 14 (Zhengzhou Metro) =

Metro line in Zhengzhou, China

- 14
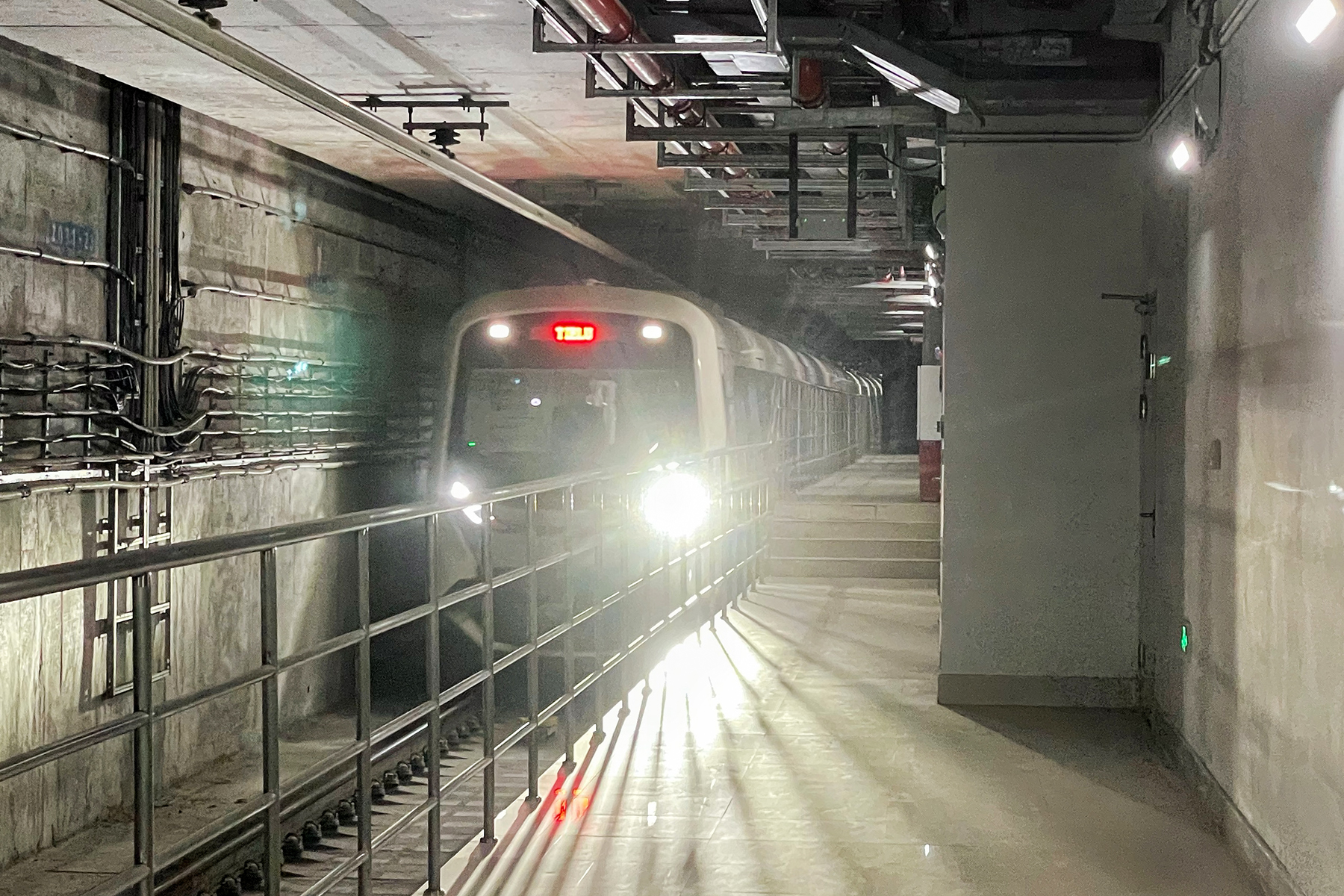
- A train of Zhengzhou Metro Line 14

Overview
- Status: In Operation
- Owner: Zhengzhou
- Locale: Zhengzhou, Henan, China
- Termini: Xushui; Lianhu
- Stations: 5 (in operation); 6 (full of Phase 1)

Service
- Type: Rapid transit
- System: Zhengzhou Metro
- Operator(s): Zhengzhou Metro Group Corporation
- Rolling stock: 6-car Type B

History
- Opened: 19 September 2019; 6 years ago

Technical
- Line length: 7.455 km (4.63 mi) (Phase 1)
- Number of tracks: 2
- Character: Underground
- Track gauge: 1,435 mm (4 ft 8 1/2 in)
- Operating speed: 100 km/h

Line 14 of Zhengzhou Metro (Chinese: 郑州地铁14号线; pinyin: zhèngzhōu dìtiě shísìhào xiàn) is a rapid transit line in Zhengzhou, Henan Province, China. The line uses 6-car Type B trains.

Phase 1 of Line 14 is 7.455 km in length with 6 stations. The line was opened on 19 September 2019.

== Opening timeline ==
Segment	Commencement	Length	Station(s)	Name
Tielu — Olympic Sports Center	19 September 2019		3	initial section of Phase 1
Olympic Sports Center — Lianhu	12 May 2023		1	Phase 1 southern extension
Shimindadao	19 November 2024		1	infill station

== Stations ==
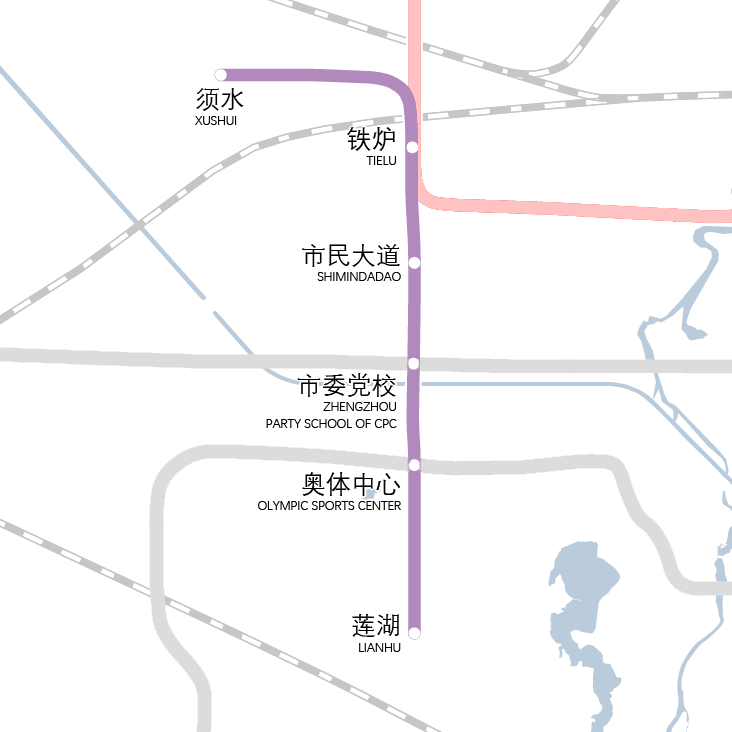
Map of Zhengzhou Metro Line 14 (Phase 1)

Legend

- Stations in operation.
- Stations under construction.

Station №	Service Route	Station name		Connections	Distance km	Location
Station №	Service Route	English	Chinese	Connections	Distance km	Location
1431		Xushui	须水			Zhongyuan
1432	●	Tielu	铁炉	1		Zhongyuan
1433	●	Shimindadao	市民大道			Zhongyuan
1434	●	Shiwei Dangxiao	市委党校	10		Zhongyuan
1435	●	Olympic Sports Center	奥体中心	6		Zhongyuan
1436	●	Lianhu	莲湖			Zhongyuan
