= Zhengzhou No.1 High School =

- 郑州市第一中学

Location
- Zhongyuan Xi Road; 182 Zhongyuan West Road "中原西路182号"; Zhongyuan District; Zhengzhou, Henan; China

Information
- Type: Public
- Established: March 5, 1949
- School district: Zhongyuan District
- Dean: Fang Jinping"方金平"
- Principal: Han Song"韩松"
- Head teacher: Han Song"韩松"
- Average class size: 60
- Song: Xiang Zhe Wei Lai，Xiang Zhe Ming Tian
- Nickname: 郑州一中
- USNWR ranking: The best high school in Henan province
- National ranking: No. 18
- Newspaper: Wen Xin 闻心
- Website: www.zzyz.com.cn
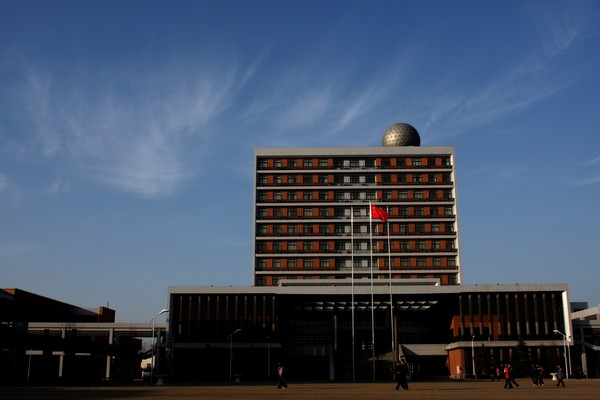

Zhengzhou No.1 High School (Chinese: 郑州市 第一 中学; pinyin: Zhèng-zhōu-shì dì-yī zhōng-xué) is also called No.1 Middle School of Zhengzhou. It is a high school for both junior and senior students in Zhengzhou, Henan, China. It is one of the 16 Provincial Beacon High Schools in Zhengzhou. The school is located in Zhongyuan Xi Road, Zhongyuan District.

== History ==
The School was founded on March 5, 1949. It combined urban No.1 Middle School, No.2 Middle School and private "MingXin" Middle School in Zhengzhou. It was named the high school of Zhengzhou City. Qi Luyu, the minister of publicity department of Zhengzhou city government was appointed as the inaugural headmaster. At that time, there were only seven classes, 249 students in total and 26 teachers and staff members.

In March, 1953, the scale expanded and changed its name into "Zhengzhou No.1 Advanced School in Henan Province"

In August 1956, the school moved to Nanyang Road in Zhengzhou.

In 1959, it was identified as one of the key middle schools in Zhengzhou.

In 2005, Zhengzhou No. 1 Middle School had constructed a new campus of about 331 mus in Zhongyuan Xi Road.

In 2007, it was identified as one of the top 100 middle schools in China.

Today there are over 2,500 students studying and about 200 teachers and staff members working at the school.

== Current School Leaders ==
- Headmaster: Han Song.
- Deputy Headmaster: BaoJian He, JianJun Guo and Yiling Zhang.
- Secretary: Wu JianCai.

== Associations and Clubs ==
"XinYun" poem club

"Xinquan" literature club

"Xinhui" drawing club

"Xinyi" Chess Club

"Xinwu" Dancing Club

"Youth Melody" School Chorus

"Xiwachuooo" Asian Club

Campus Radio Station

Campus Journalistic Station

The association of the shutterbug

Model United Nation Club

== Gallery ==
The Living Zone in Zhengzhou No.1 High School

The audience seats of playground in Zhengzhou No.1 High School

The gate of Zhengzhou No.1 High School
