= List of public transport routes numbered 14 =

In public transport, Route 14 may refer to:

- Route 14 (MTA Maryland), a bus route between Baltimore and Annapolis, Maryland
- London Buses route 14
- 14 Mission, a bus route in San Francisco
- SEPTA Route 14, a bus route in Philadelphia

== See also ==
- Line 14 (disambiguation)
