= Henan University of Technology =

Provincial public university in Zhengzhou, Henan, China

- 河南工业大学
- Motto: Virtue, Truth, Innovation, Practice (明德，求是，拓新，笃行)
- Type: Public (provincial)
- Established: 2004
- President: Zhishen Wu (吴智深)
- Faculty: 2,115
- Students: 33,500
- Undergraduates: 29,500
- Postgraduates: 4,000
- Location: No. 100 Lianhua Street, High tech Zone, Zhengzhou, Henan, China
- Campus: Urban
- Website: haut.edu.cn

Henan University of Technology
- Simplified Chinese: 河南工业大学
- Traditional Chinese: 河南工業大學
Transcriptions
Standard Mandarin
- Hanyu Pinyin: Hénán Gōngyè Dàxué

The Henan University of Technology (HAUT; 河南工业大学) is a provincial public university in Zhengzhou, Henan, China. It is affiliated with the province of Henan, and co-funded by the Henan Provincial People's Government and the National Administration of Grain.

The institute was established in 2004 as a merger of the Zhengzhou Institute of Technology (郑州工程学院) and the Zhengzhou Industrial Higher Vocational School (郑州工业高等专科学校), both established in 1956.

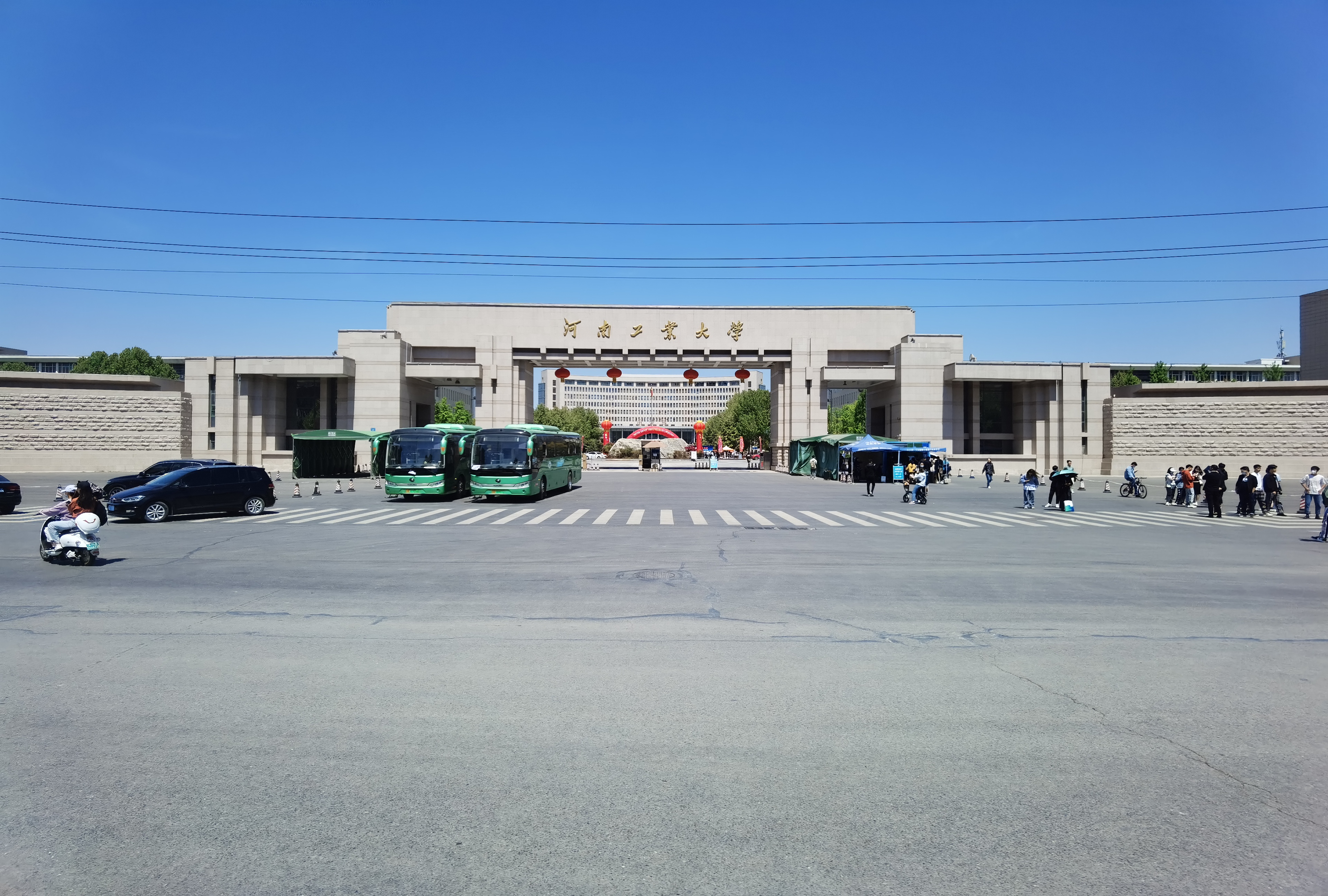
Gate of Henan University of Technology

Henan University of Technology currently has three campuses on Lianhua Street, Songshan Road, and Zhongyuan Road, covering an area of 2764.5 acres and a building area of 1.013 million square meters, and built with high standard teaching buildings and modern student apartments.

== History ==
The Henan University of Technology traces its roots to 1956. Food Sciences and Technology is one of its key specialities which includes cereal science and technology, cereal based food, storage of cereal grains and their products, oil and fat chemistry and technology. Grain physical distribution and grain machinery are also key specialty of this university.
