= Zhongyuan, Zhengzhou =

Zhongyuan 中原区 Chungyuan
- District
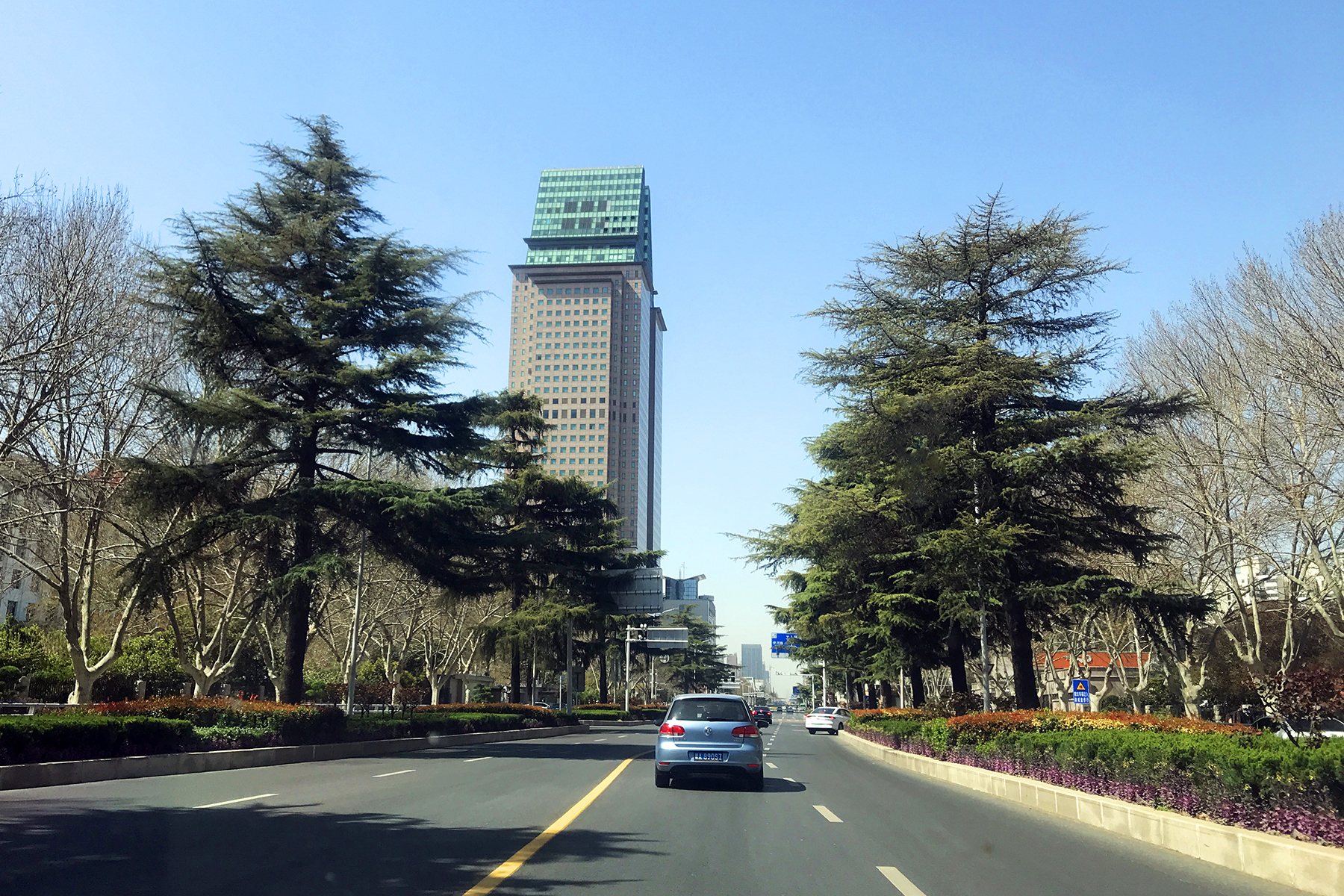

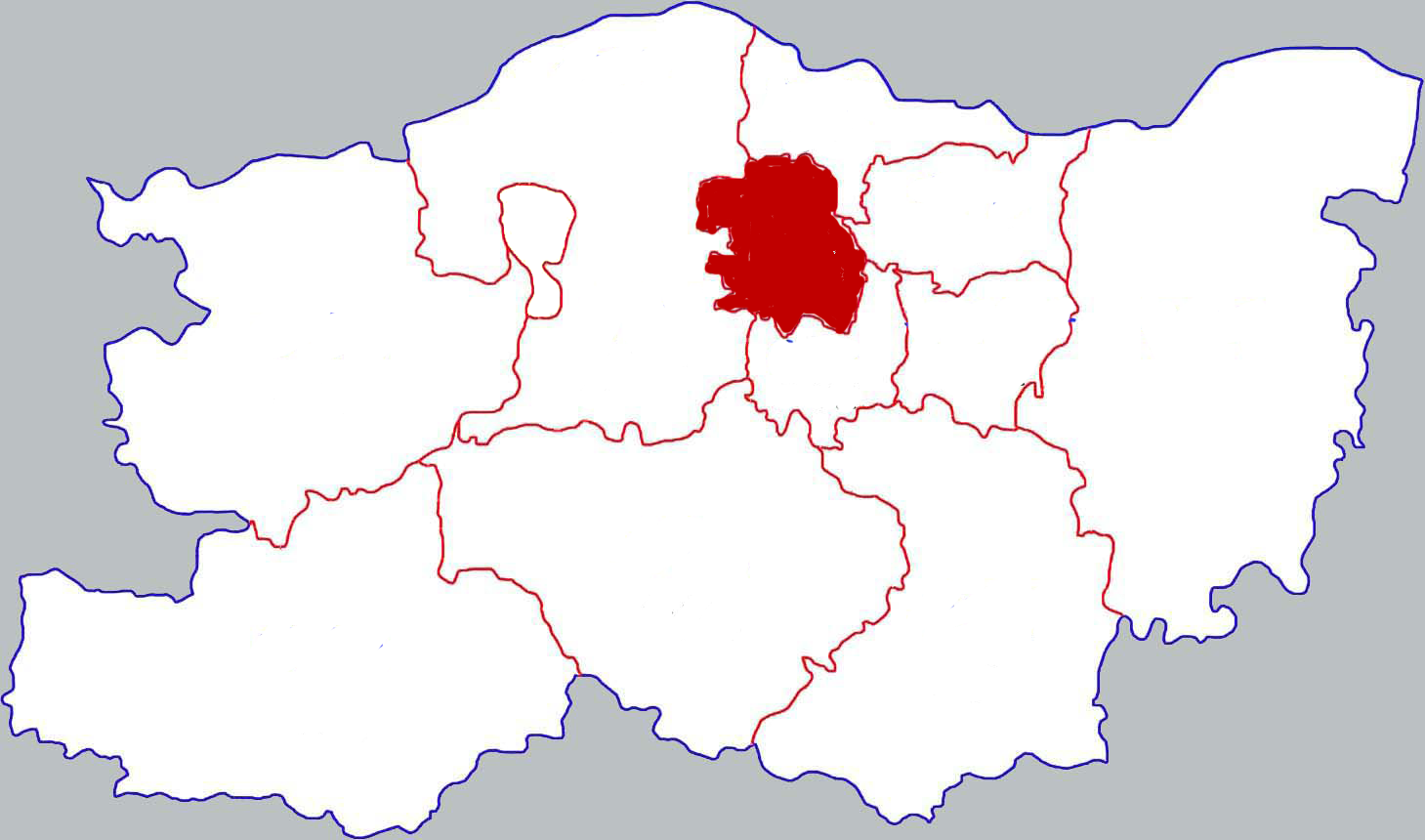
- Location in Zhengzhou

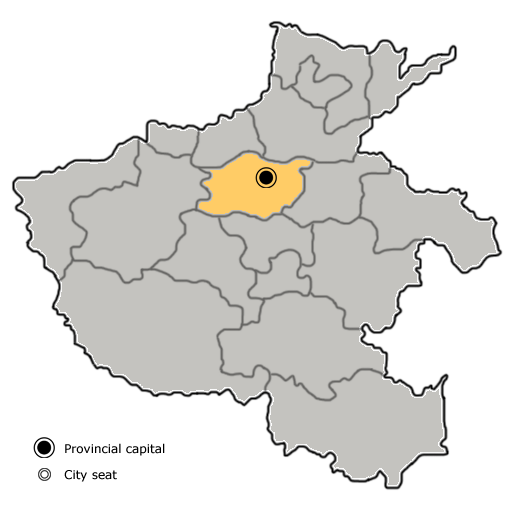
- Zhengzhou in Henan
- Coordinates: 34°45′37″N 113°38′31″E
- Country: People's Republic of China
- Province: Henan
- Prefecture-level city: Zhengzhou

Area
  - Total: 195 km^{2} (75 sq mi)

Population (2019)
  - Total: 1,080,900
  - Density: 5,540/km^{2} (14,400/sq mi)
- Time zone: UTC+8 (China Standard)
- Postal code: 450007
- Website: www.zhongyuan.gov.cn

Zhongyuan District (simplified Chinese: 中原区; traditional Chinese: 中原區; pinyin: Zhōngyuán Qū; lit. 'central plain') is one of 6 urban districts and the municipal seat of the prefecture-level city of Zhengzhou, the capital of Henan Province, South Central China. The city government is located in this district.

Zhongyuan is the second most populous district in Zhengzhou with a population of over 900,000. It is the city's industrial center especially in textiles, though many factories are closing and moving into more remote areas due to pollution. Zhengzhou University is located in the district as well as Zhengzhou No.1 High School and many of Henan's best middle schools. Zhongyuan is undergoing a construction boom though not as intense as the eastern area of the city.

== Administrative divisions ==
As of 2012, this city is divided to 12 subdistricts, 1 town and 1 township.

Subdistricts

- Linshanzhai Subdistrict (林山寨街道)
- Jianshelu Subdistrict (建设路街道)
- Ruhelu Subdistrict (汝河路街道)
- Mianfanglu Subdistrict (棉纺路街道)
- Lüdongcun Subdistrict (绿东村街道)
- Qinlinglu Subdistrict (秦岭路街道)
- Sanguanmiao Subdistrict (三官庙街道)
- Tongbailu Subdistrict (桐柏路街道)
- Hanghaixilu Subdistrict (航海西路街道)
- Zhongyuanxilu Subdistrict (中原西路街道)
- Xiliuhu Subdistrict (西流湖街道)
- Xushui Subdistrict (须水街道)

Towns

- Shifo (石佛镇)

Townships

- Gouzhao Township (沟赵乡)
