= Henan University of Technology station =

Metro station in Zhengzhou, China

Henan University of Technology 河南工业大学
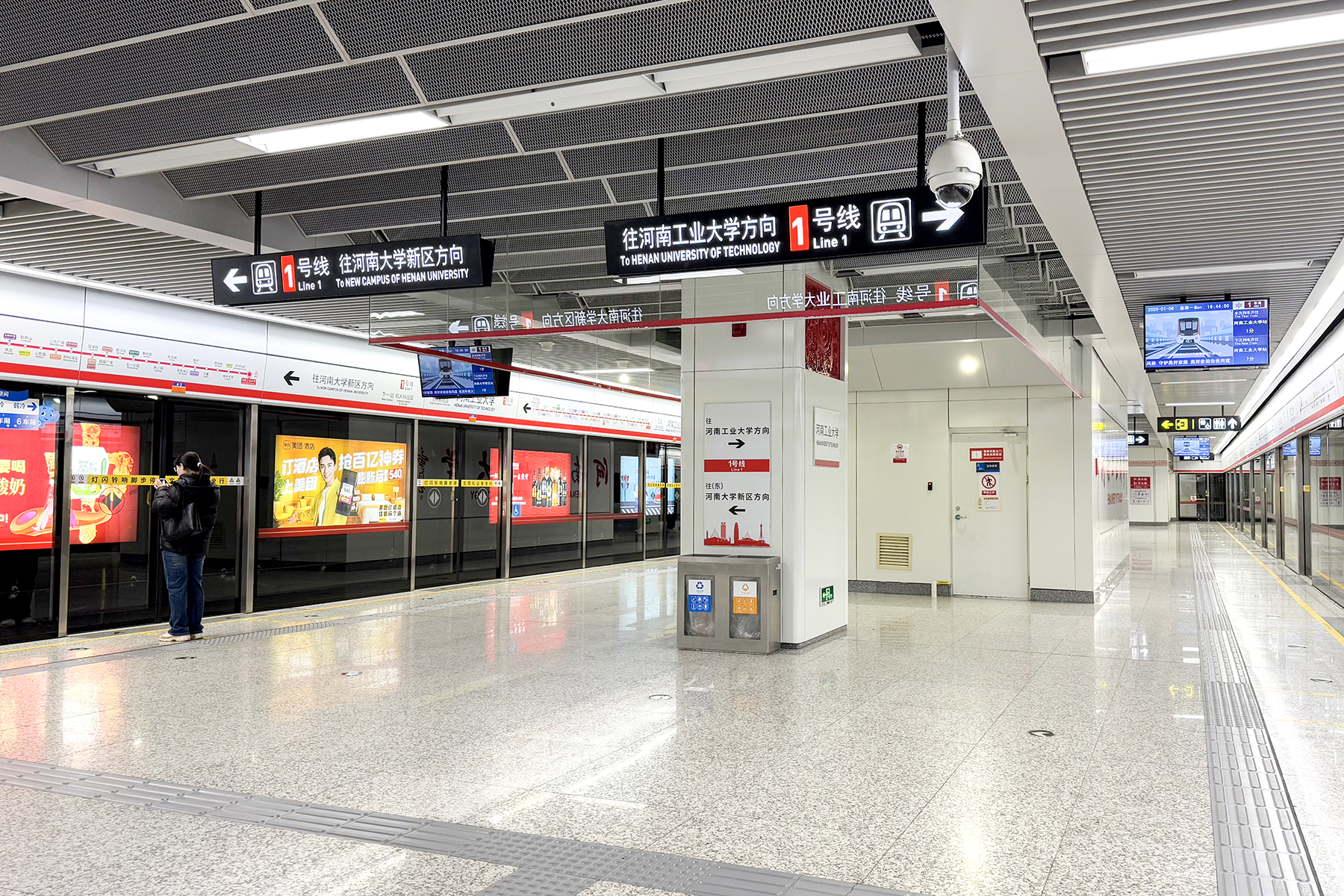

General information
- Location: Changchun Road × Lianhua Street; Zhongyuan District, Zhengzhou; China
- Coordinates: 34.8280°N 113.5360°E
- System: Zhengzhou Metro rapid transit station
- Operator: Zhengzhou Metro
- Line: Line 1
- Platforms: 2 (1 island platform)
- Connections: Bus; Zhengzhou BRT

Construction
- Structure type: Underground

Other information
- Station code: 114

History
- Opened: 12 January 2017

Services
Preceding station	Zhengzhou Metro	Following station
Terminus	Line 1	Zhengzhou University Sci-Tech Park towards New Campus of Henan University
Location
- Location within Zhengzhou

Henan University of Technology (Chinese: 河南工业大学) is the western terminus of Zhengzhou Metro Line 1. It was opened on 12 January 2017. The station lies beneath the crossing of Changchun Road and Lianhua Street.

== Station layout ==
The station has 2 floors underground. The B1 floor is for the station concourse and the B2 floor is for the platforms and tracks. The station has one island platform and two tracks for Line 1.

Trains usually use platform 1 for loading/unloading passengers.

G	-	Exit
B1	Concourse	Customer Service, Vending machines
B2; Platforms	Platform 2	Line 1 towards New Campus of Henan University (Zhengzhou University Sci-Tech Park) →
B2; Platforms	Island platform
B2; Platforms	Platform 1	Line 1 towards New Campus of Henan University (Zhengzhou University Sci-Tech Park) →

== Exits ==
Exit	Destination	Bus connections
Exit A	Changchun Road (east side), Lianhua Street (south side)	B2, B27, B35, B66
Exit E	Lianhua Street (south side), Changchun Road (west side), North gate of Zhengzhou University	B27, B66
Exit F	Lianhua Street (north side), Changchun Road (west side)	45, 271 B2, B27, B35, B66, S150, S152
Exit G	Lianhua Street (north side), Changchun Road (east side), West gate of Henan University of Technology	45, B2, B35, B66, S150, S152

== Surroundings ==
- Henan University of Technology
- Zhengzhou University
