= List of Zhengzhou Metro stations =

The following is a list of stations found within the Zhengzhou Metro.

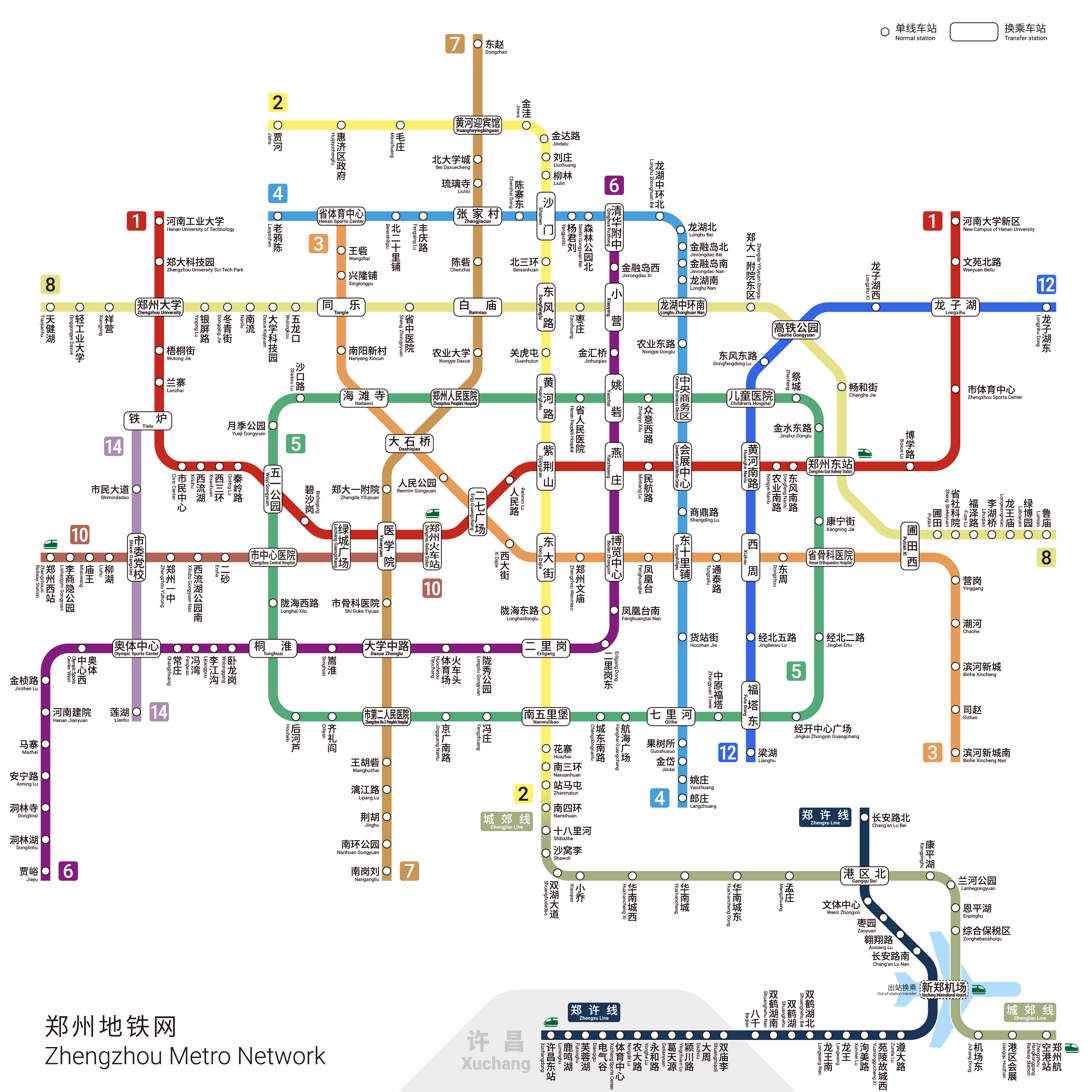
Map of the Zhengzhou Metro

== Line 1 ==
Stations of Line 1
Station	Chinese name	Location	Transfers	Platform type	Grade	Opened
Henan University of Technology	河南工业大学	Zhongyuan	Zhengzhou BRT	Island	Underground	12 January 2017
Zhengzhou University Sci-Tech Park	郑大科技园	Zhongyuan		Island	Underground	12 January 2017
Zhengzhou University	郑州大学	Zhongyuan	8	Island	Underground	12 January 2017
Wutongjie	梧桐街	Zhongyuan		Island	Underground	12 January 2017
Lanzhai	兰寨	Zhongyuan		Island	Underground	12 January 2017
Tielu	铁炉	Zhongyuan	14	Island	Underground	12 January 2017
Civic Center	市民中心	Zhongyuan		Island	Underground	12 January 2017
Xiliuhu	西流湖	Zhongyuan		Island	Underground	26 December 2013
Xisanhuan	西三环	Zhongyuan		Island	Underground	26 December 2013
Qinlinglu	秦岭路	Zhongyuan	Zhengzhou BRT	Island	Underground	26 December 2013
Wuyigongyuan	五一公园	Zhongyuan	5 Zhengzhou BRT	Island	Underground	26 December 2013
Bishagang	碧沙岗	Zhongyuan		Island	Underground	26 December 2013
Lüchengguangchang	绿城广场	Erqi	10	Island	Underground	26 December 2013
Yixueyuan	医学院	Erqi	7 10	Island	Underground	26 December 2013
Zhengzhou Railway Station	郑州火车站	Erqi	10	Island	Underground	26 December 2013
Erqiguangchang	二七广场	Erqi	3	Island	Underground	26 December 2013
Renminlu	人民路	Guancheng and Jinshui		Island	Underground	26 December 2013
Zijingshan	紫荆山	Jinshui	2	Island	Underground	26 December 2013
Yanzhuang	燕庄	Jinshui	6	Island	Underground	26 December 2013
Minhanglu	民航路	Jinshui		Island	Underground	26 December 2013
Convention and Exhibition Center	会展中心	Jinshui	4	Island	Underground	26 December 2013
Huanghenanlu	黄河南路	Jinshui	12	Island	Underground	26 December 2013
Nongyenanlu	农业南路	Jinshui		Island	Underground	26 December 2013
Dongfengnanlu	东风南路	Jinshui		Island	Underground	26 December 2013
Zhengzhou East Railway Station	郑州东站	Jinshui	5 Zhengzhou BRT	Island	Underground	26 December 2013
Boxuelu	博学路	Jinshui		Island	Underground	26 December 2013
Zhengzhou Sports Center	市体育中心	Jinshui		Island	Underground	26 December 2013
Longzihu	龙子湖	Jinshui	12	Island	Underground	12 January 2017
Wenyuanbeilu	文苑北路	Jinshui		Island	Underground	12 January 2017
New Campus of Henan University	河南大学新区	Jinshui		Island	Underground	21 November 2019

== Line 2 ==
Stations of Line 2
Station	Chinese name	Location	Transfers	Platform type	Grade	Opened
Jiahe	贾河	Huiji		Side	Underground	28 December 2019
Huijiquzhengfu	惠济区政府	Huiji		Island	Underground	28 December 2019
Maozhuang	毛庄	Huiji		Island	Underground	28 December 2019
Huangheyingbinguan	黄河迎宾馆	Huiji	7	Island	Underground	28 December 2019
Jinwa	金洼	Huiji		Island	Underground	28 December 2019
Jindalu	金达路	Huiji		Island	Underground	28 December 2019
Liuzhuang	刘庄	Jinshui		Island	Underground	19 August 2016
Liulin	柳林	Jinshui		Island	Underground	19 August 2016
Shamen	沙门	Jinshui	4	Island	Underground	19 August 2016
Beisanhuan	北三环	Jinshui	Zhengzhou BRT	Island	Underground	19 August 2016
Dongfenglu	东风路	Jinshui		Island	Underground	19 August 2016
Guanhutun	关虎屯	Jinshui	Zhengzhou BRT	Island	Underground	19 August 2016
Huanghelu	黄河路	Jinshui	5	Island	Underground	19 August 2016
Zijingshan	紫荆山	Jinshui	1	Island	Underground	26 December 2013
Dongdajie	东大街	Guancheng	3	Island	Underground	19 August 2016
Longhaidonglu	陇海东路	Guancheng	Zhengzhou BRT	Island	Underground	19 August 2016
Erligang	二里岗	Guancheng		Island	Underground	19 August 2016
Nanwulibao	南五里堡	Guancheng	5	Island	Underground	19 August 2016
Huazhai	花寨	Guancheng		Island	Underground	19 August 2016
Nansanhuan	南三环	Guancheng		Island	Underground	19 August 2016
Zhanmatun	站马屯	Guancheng		Island	Underground	19 August 2016
Nansihuan	南四环	Guancheng	Chengjiao	Island	Underground	19 August 2016

== Line 3 ==
Stations of Line 3
Station	Chinese name	Location	Transfers	Platform type	Grade	Opened
Henan Sports Center	省体育中心	Huiji	4	Island	Underground	26 December 2020
Wangzhai	王砦	Huiji		Island	Underground	26 December 2020
Xinglongpu	兴隆铺	Huiji		Island	Underground	26 December 2020
Tongle	同乐	Jinshui	8	Island	Underground	26 December 2020
Nanyang Xincun	南阳新村	Jinshui		Island	Underground	26 December 2020
Haitansi	海滩寺	Jinshui	5	Island	Underground	26 December 2020
Dashiqiao	大石桥	Jinshui	7	Island	Underground	26 December 2020
Renmin Gongyuan	人民公园	Erqi		Split	Underground	26 December 2020
Erqi Guangchang	二七广场	Erqi	1	Dual-island	Underground	26 December 2020
Xi Dajie	西大街	Guancheng		Island	Underground	26 December 2020
Dong Dajie	东大街	Guancheng	2	Island	Underground	26 December 2020
Zhengzhou Wenmiao	郑州文庙	Guancheng		Island	Underground	26 December 2020
Bolan Zhongxin	博览中心	Guancheng	6	Island	Underground	26 December 2020
Fenghuangtai	凤凰台	Jinshui		Island	Underground	26 December 2020
Dongshilipu	东十里铺	Jinshui	4	Island	Underground	26 December 2020
Tongtailu	通泰路	Jinshui		Island	Underground	26 December 2020
Xizhou	西周	Guancheng	12	Island	Underground	26 December 2020
Dongzhou	东周	Guancheng		Island	Underground	26 December 2020
Henan Orthopaedics Hospital	省骨科医院	Guancheng	5	Island	Underground	26 December 2020
Putian Xi	莆田西	Guancheng	8	Island	Underground	26 June 2021
Yinggang	营岗	Guancheng		Island	Underground	26 June 2021
Chaohe	潮河	Guancheng		Island	Underground	8 September 2023
Binhe Xincheng	滨河新城	Guancheng		Island	Underground	8 September 2023
Sizhao	司赵	Guancheng		Island	Underground	8 September 2023
Binhe Xincheng Nan	滨河新城南	Guancheng		Side	Underground	8 September 2023

== Line 4 ==
Stations of Line 4
Station	Chinese name	Location	Transfers	Platform type	Grade	Opened
Laoyachen	老鸦陈	Huiji		Island	Underground	26 December 2020
Henan Sports Center	省体育中心	Huiji	3	Island	Underground	26 December 2020
Beiershilipu	北二十里铺	Jinshui		Island	Underground	26 December 2020
Fengqing Lu	丰庆路	Jinshui		Island	Underground	26 December 2020
Zhangjiacun	张家村	Jinshui	7	Dual-island	Underground	26 December 2020
Chenzhai Dong	陈寨东	Jinshui		Island	Underground	26 December 2020
Shamen	沙门	Jinshui	2	Island	Underground	26 December 2020
Yangjunliu	杨君刘	Jinshui		Island	Underground	26 December 2020
Senlin Gongyuan Bei	森林公园北	Jinshui		Island	Underground	26 December 2020
Qinghua Fuzhong	清华附中	Jinshui	6	Island	Underground	26 December 2020
Longhu Zhonghuan Bei	龙湖中环北	Jinshui		Island	Underground	26 December 2020
Longhu Bei	龙湖北	Jinshui		Island	Underground	26 December 2020
Jinrongdao Bei	金融岛北	Jinshui		Island	Underground	1 March 2022
Jinrongdao Nan	金融岛南	Jinshui		Island	Underground	1 March 2022
Longhu Nan	龙湖南	Jinshui		Island	Underground	26 December 2020
Longhu Zhonghuan Nan	龙湖中环南	Jinshui	8	Island	Underground	26 December 2020
Nongye Donglu	农业东路	Jinshui		Island	Underground	26 December 2020
Central Business District	中央商务区	Jinshui	5	Island	Underground	26 December 2020
Convention and Exhibition Center	会展中心	Jinshui	1	Island	Underground	26 December 2020
Shangding Lu	商鼎路	Jinshui		Island	Underground	26 December 2020
Dongshilipu	东十里铺	Jinshui	3	Island	Underground	26 December 2020
Huozhan Jie	货站街	Jinshui		Island	Underground	26 December 2020
Qilihe	七里河	Guancheng	5	Island	Underground	26 December 2020
Guoshusuo	果树所	Guancheng		Island	Underground	26 December 2020
Jindai	金岱	Guancheng		Island	Underground	26 December 2020
Yaozhuang	姚庄	Guancheng		Dual-island	Underground	26 December 2020
Langzhuang	郎庄	Guancheng		Island	Underground	26 December 2020

== Line 5 ==
Stations of Line 5
Station	Chinese name	Location	Transfers	Platform type	Grade	Opened
— ↑ Loop line - towards Wuyigongyuan ↑ —
Yueji Gongyuan	月季公园	Zhongyuan		Island	Underground	20 May 2019
Shakou Lu	沙口路	Jinshui		Island	Underground	20 May 2019
Haitansi	海滩寺	Jinshui	3	Island	Underground	20 May 2019
Zhengzhou Renminyiyuan	郑州人民医院	Jinshui	7	Island	Underground	20 May 2019
Huanghelu	黄河路	Jinshui	2	Island	Underground	20 May 2019
Henan People's Hospital	省人民医院	Jinshui		Island	Underground	20 May 2019
Yaozhai	姚砦	Jinshui	6	Island	Underground	20 May 2019
Zhongyixilu	众意西路	Jinshui		Island	Underground	20 May 2019
Central Business District	中央商务区	Jinshui	4	Island	Underground	20 May 2019
Children's Hospital	儿童医院	Jinshui	12	Island	Underground	20 May 2019
Zhacheng	祭城	Jinshui		Island	Underground	20 May 2019
Jinshuidonglu	金水东路	Jinshui		Island	Underground	20 May 2019
Zhengzhoudong Railway Station	郑州东站	Jinshui	1 8 Zhengzhou BRT	Dual-island	Underground	20 May 2019
Kangning Jie	康宁街	Guancheng		Island	Underground	20 May 2019
Henan Orthopaedics Hospital	省骨科医院	Guancheng	3	Island	Underground	20 May 2019
Jingbei Erlu	经北二路	Guancheng		Island	Underground	15 May 2021
Jingkai Zhongxin Guangchang	经开中心广场	Guancheng		Island	Underground	20 May 2019
Futa Dong	福塔东	Guancheng	12	Island	Underground	20 May 2019
Zhongyuan Tower	中原福塔	Guancheng		Island	Underground	20 May 2019
Qilihe	七里河	Guancheng	4	Island	Underground	20 May 2019
Hanghai Guangchang	航海广场	Guancheng		Island	Underground	20 May 2019
Chengdongnanlu	城东南路	Guancheng		Island	Underground	20 May 2019
Nanwulibao	南五里堡	Guancheng	2	Island	Underground	20 May 2019
Fengzhuang	冯庄	Erqi		Island	Underground	20 May 2019
Jingguang Nanlu	京广南路	Erqi		Island	Underground	20 May 2019
Shi Dier Renminyiyuan	市第二人民医院	Erqi	7	Island	Underground	20 May 2019
Qiliyan	齐礼阎	Erqi		Island	Underground	20 May 2019
Houhelu	后河芦	Zhongyuan		Island	Underground	20 May 2019
Tonghuai	桐淮	Zhongyuan	6	Island	Underground	20 May 2019
Longhai Xilu	陇海西路	Zhongyuan	Zhengzhou BRT	Island	Underground	20 May 2019
Zhengzhou Central Hospital	市中心医院	Zhongyuan	10	Island	Underground	20 May 2019
Wuyigongyuan	五一公园	Zhongyuan	1	Island	Underground	20 May 2019
— ↓ Loop line - towards Yuejigongyuan ↓ —

== Line 6 ==
Stations of Line 6
Station	Chinese name	Location	Transfers	Platform type	Grade	Opened
Jiayu	贾峪	Xingyang		Island	Underground	30 September 2022
Donglinhu	洞林湖	Xingyang		Island	Elevated	30 September 2022
Donglinsi	洞林寺	Xingyang		Island	Underground	30 September 2022
Anning Lu	安宁路	Erqi		Side	Underground	30 September 2022
Mazhai	马寨	Erqi		Island	Underground	30 September 2022
Henan Jianyuan	河南建院	Erqi		Island	Underground	30 September 2022
Jinzhen Lu	金桢路	Zhongyuan		Island	Underground	16 January 2023
Olympic Sports Center West	奥体中心西	Zhongyuan		Island	Underground	30 September 2022
Olympic Sports Center	奥体中心	Zhongyuan	14	Island	Underground	30 September 2022
Changzhuang	常庄	Zhongyuan		Island	Underground	30 September 2022
Fengwan	冯湾	Zhongyuan		Island	Underground	30 November 2024
Lijianggou	李江沟	Zhongyuan		Island	Underground	30 November 2024
Wolonggang	卧龙岗	Zhongyuan		Island	Underground	30 November 2024
Tonghuai	桐淮	Zhongyuan	5	Island	Underground	30 November 2024
Songhuai	嵩淮	Erqi		Island	Underground	30 November 2024
Daxue Zhonglu	大学中路	Erqi	7	Island	Underground	30 November 2024
Huochetou Tiyuchang	火车头体育场	Erqi		Island	Underground	30 November 2024
Longxiu Gongyuan	陇秀公园	Erqi		Island	Underground	30 November 2024
Erligang	二里岗	Guancheng	2	Island	Underground	30 November 2024
Erligang Dong	二里岗东	Guancheng		Island	Underground	30 November 2024
Fenghuangtai Nan	凤凰台南	Guancheng		Island	Underground	30 November 2024
Bolan Zhongxin	博览中心	Jinshui	3	Island	Underground	30 November 2024
Yanzhuang	燕庄	Jinshui	1	Island	Underground	30 November 2024
Yaozhai	姚砦	Jinshui	5	Island	Underground	30 November 2024
Jinhuiqiao	金汇桥	Jinshui		Island	Underground	30 November 2024
Xiaoying	小营	Jinshui	8	Island	Underground	30 November 2024
Jinrongdao Xi	金融岛西	Jinshui		Island	Underground	30 November 2024
Qinghua Fuzhong	清华附中	Jinshui	4	Island	Underground	30 November 2024

== Line 7 ==
Stations of Line 7
Station	Chinese name	Location	Transfers	Platform type	Grade	Opened
Huanghe Bolanguan	黄河博览馆	Huiji		Island	Underground	N/A
Dongzhao	东赵	Huiji		Island	Underground	29 December 2024
Huanghe Yingbinguan	黄河迎宾馆	Huiji	2	Island	Underground	29 December 2024
Bei Daxuecheng	北大学城	Huiji		Island	Underground	29 December 2024
Liulisi	琉璃寺	Jinshui		Island	Underground	29 December 2024
Zhangjiacun	张家村	Jinshui	4	Dual-island	Underground	29 December 2024
Chenzhai	陈砦	Jinshui		Island	Underground	29 December 2024
Baimiao	白庙	Jinshui	8	Island	Underground	29 December 2024
Nongye Daxue	农业大学	Jinshui		Island	Underground	29 December 2024
Zhengzhou People's Hospital	郑州人民医院	Jinshui	5	Island	Underground	29 December 2024
Dashiqiao	大石桥	Jinshui	3	Island	Underground	29 December 2024
Zhengda Yifuyuan	郑大一附院	Erqi		Island	Underground	29 December 2024
Yixueyuan	医学院	Erqi	1 10	Island	Underground	29 December 2024
Shi Guke Yiyuan	市骨科医院	Erqi		Island	Underground	29 December 2024
Daxue Zhonglu	大学中路	Erqi	6	Island	Underground	29 December 2024
Shi Dier Renminyiyuan	市第二人民医院	Erqi	5	Island	Underground	29 December 2024
Wanghuzhai	王胡砦	Erqi		Island	Underground	29 December 2024
Lijiang Lu	漓江路	Erqi		Island	Underground	29 December 2024
Jinghu	荆胡	Erqi		Island	Underground	29 December 2024
Nanhuan Gongyuan	南环公园	Erqi		Island	Underground	29 December 2024
Nangangliu	南岗刘	Erqi		Island	Underground	29 December 2024

== Line 8 ==
Stations of Line 8
Station	Chinese name	Location	Transfers	Platform type	Grade	Opened
Tianjianhu	天健湖	Zhongyuan		Island	Underground	29 December 2024
Qinggongye Daxue	轻工业大学	Zhongyuan		Island	Underground	29 December 2024
Xiangying	祥营	Zhongyuan		Island	Underground	29 December 2024
Zhengzhou University	郑州大学	Zhongyuan	1	Island	Underground	29 December 2024
Yinping Lu	银屏路	Zhongyuan		Island	Underground	29 December 2024
Dongqing Jie	冬青街	Zhongyuan		Island	Underground	29 December 2024
Nanliu	南流	Zhongyuan		Island	Underground	29 December 2024
Daxue Kejiyuan	大学科技园	Zhongyuan		Island	Underground	29 December 2024
Wulongkou	五龙口	Zhongyuan		Island	Underground	29 December 2024
Tongle	同乐	Jinshui	3	Island	Underground	29 December 2024
Sheng Zhongyiyuan	省中医院	Jinshui		Island	Underground	29 December 2024
Baimiao	白庙	Jinshui	7	Island	Underground	29 December 2024
Dongfenglu	东风路	Jinshui	2	Island	Underground	29 December 2024
Zaozhuang	枣庄	Jinshui		Island	Underground	29 December 2024
Xiaoying	小营	Jinshui	6	Island	Underground	29 December 2024
Longhu Zhonghuan Nan	龙湖中环南	Jinshui	4	Island	Underground	29 December 2024
Zhengda Yifuyuan Dongqu	郑大一附院东区	Jinshui		Island	Underground	29 December 2024
Gaotie Gongyuan	高铁公园	Jinshui	12	Island	Underground	29 December 2024
Changhe Jie	畅和街	Jinshui		Side	Underground	29 December 2024
Zhengzhoudong Railway Station	郑州西站	Jinshui	1 5 Zhengzhou BRT	Dual-island	Underground	29 December 2024
Putian Xi	圃田西	Guancheng	3	Island	Underground	29 December 2024
Putian	圃田	Guancheng		Island	Underground	29 December 2024
Sheng Shekeyuan	省社科院	Zhongmu		Island	Underground	29 December 2024
Fuze Lu	福泽路	Zhongmu		Island	Underground	29 December 2024
Lihuqiao	李湖桥	Zhongmu		Island	Underground	29 December 2024
Longwangmiao	龙王庙	Zhongmu		Island	Underground	29 December 2024
Luboyuan	绿博园	Zhongmu		Island	Underground	29 December 2024
Lumiao	鲁庙	Zhongmu		Island	Underground	29 December 2024

== Line 10 ==
Stations of Line 10
Station	Chinese name	Location	Transfers	Platform type	Grade	Opened
Zhengzhouxi Railway Station	郑州西站	Xingyang		Island	Underground	28 September 2023
Lishangyin Gongyuan	李商隐公园	Xingyang		Island	Underground	28 September 2023
Miaowang	庙王	Zhongyuan		Island	Underground	28 September 2023
Liuhu	柳湖	Zhongyuan		Island	Underground	28 September 2023
Shiwei Dangxiao	市委党校	Zhongyuan	14	Island	Underground	28 September 2023
Zhengzhou Yizhong	郑州一中	Zhongyuan		Island	Underground	28 September 2023
Xiliuhu Gongyuan Nan	西流湖公园南	Zhongyuan		Island	Underground	28 September 2023
Ersha	二砂	Zhongyuan		Island	Underground	28 September 2023
Zhengzhou Central Hospital	市中心医院	Zhongyuan	5	Island	Underground	28 September 2023
Lüchengguangchang	绿城广场	Erqi	1	Island	Underground	28 September 2023
Yixueyuan	医学院	Erqi	1 7	Island	Underground	28 September 2023
Zhengzhou Railway Station	郑州火车站	Erqi	1	Island	Underground	28 September 2023

== Line 12 ==
Stations of Line 12
Station	Chinese name	Location	Transfers	Platform type	Grade	Opened
Lianghu	梁湖	Guancheng		Island	Underground	20 December 2023
Futa Dong	福塔东	Guancheng	5	Island	Underground	20 December 2023
Jingbeiwu Lu	经北五路	Guancheng		Island	Underground	20 December 2023
Xizhou	西周	Guancheng	3	Island	Underground	20 December 2023
Huanghenanlu	黄河南路	Jinshui	1	Island	Underground	20 December 2023
Children's Hospital	儿童医院	Jinshui	5	Island	Underground	20 December 2023
Dongfengdong Lu	东风东路	Jinshui		Island	Underground	20 December 2023
Gaotie Gongyuan	高铁公园	Jinshui	8	Island	Underground	20 December 2023
Longzihu Xi	龙子湖西	Jinshui		Island	Underground	20 December 2023
Longzihu	龙子湖	Jinshui	1	Island	Underground	20 December 2023
Longzihu Dong	龙子湖东	Jinshui		Island	Underground	20 December 2023

== Line 14 ==
Stations of Line 14
Station	Chinese name	Location	Transfers	Platform type	Grade	Opened
Xushui	须水	Zhongyuan		Island	Underground	N/A
Tielu	铁炉	Zhongyuan	1	Island	Underground	19 September 2019
Shimindadao	市民大道	Zhongyuan		Island	Underground	19 November 2024
Shiwei Dangxiao	市委党校	Zhongyuan	10	Island	Underground	19 September 2019
Olympic Sports Center	奥体中心	Zhongyuan	6	Island	Underground	19 September 2019
Lianhu	莲湖	Zhongyuan		Island	Underground	12 May 2023

== Chengjiao line ==
Stations of Chengjiao line
Station	Chinese name	Location	Transfers	Platform type	Grade	Opened
Nansihuan	南四环	Guancheng	2	Island	Underground	19 August 2016
Shibalihe	十八里河	Guancheng		Dual-island	Underground	12 January 2017
Shawoli	沙窝李	Xinzheng		Dual-island	Elevated	12 January 2017
Shuanghudadao	双湖大道	Xinzheng		Side	Elevated	12 January 2017
Xiaoqiao	小乔	Xinzheng		Side	Elevated	22 September 2023
Hua'nancheng West	华南城西	Xinzheng		Side	Elevated	12 January 2017
Hua'nancheng	华南城	Xinzheng		Side	Elevated	12 January 2017
Hua'nancheng East	华南城东	Xinzheng		Side	Elevated	22 September 2023
Mengzhuang	孟庄	Xinzheng		Dual-island	Elevated	12 January 2017
Gangqu Bei	港区北	Xinzheng	Zhengxu	Island	Underground	12 December 2020
Kangpinghu	康平湖	Xinzheng and Zhongmu		Island	Underground	16 November 2017
Lanhegongyuan	兰河公园	Xinzheng		Island	Underground	12 January 2017
Enpinghu	恩平湖	Zhongmu		Island	Underground	12 January 2017
Zonghebaoshuiqu	综合保税区	Zhongmu		Island	Underground	12 January 2017
Xinzheng International Airport	新郑机场	Xinzheng	Zhengxu	Island	Underground	12 January 2017
Terminal 3	3号航站楼	Xinzheng		Island	Underground	N/A
Jichang Dong	机场东	Zhongmu		Island	Underground	20 June 2022
Gangquhuizhan	港区会展	Zhongmu		Island	Underground	20 June 2022
Zhengzhou Hangkonggang Railway Station	郑州航空港战	Zhongmu	China Railway High-speed	Island	Underground	20 June 2022

== Zhengxu line ==
Stations of Zhengxu line
Station	Chinese name	Location	Transfers	Platform type	Grade	Opened
Chang'an Lu Bei	长安路北	Zhongmu, Zhengzhou		Island	Underground	28 December 2023
Gangqu Bei	港区北	Xinzheng, Zhengzhou	Chengjiao	Island	Underground	28 December 2023
Wenti Zhongxin	文体中心	Xinzheng, Zhengzhou		Island	Underground	28 December 2023
Zaoyuan	枣园	Xinzheng, Zhengzhou		Island	Underground	28 December 2023
Aoxiang Lu	翱翔路	Xinzheng, Zhengzhou		Island	Underground	28 December 2023
Chang'an Lu Nan	长安路南	Xinzheng, Zhengzhou		Island	Underground	28 December 2023
Xinzheng International Airport	新郑机场	Xinzheng, Zhengzhou	Chengjiao	Island	Underground	28 December 2023
Zunda Lu	遵大路	Xinzheng, Zhengzhou		Island	Underground	28 December 2023
Yuanlinggucheng Xi	苑陵故城西	Xinzheng, Zhengzhou		Island	Underground	28 December 2023
Xunmei Lu	洵美路	Xinzheng, Zhengzhou		Island	Underground	28 December 2023
Longwang	龙王	Xinzheng, Zhengzhou		Island	Underground	28 December 2023
Longwang Nan	龙王南	Xinzheng, Zhengzhou		Island	Underground	28 December 2023
Shuanghehu Bei	双鹤湖北	Xinzheng, Zhengzhou		Island	Underground	28 December 2023
Shuanghehu	双鹤湖	Xinzheng, Zhengzhou		Island	Underground	28 December 2023
Shuanghehu Nan	双鹤湖南	Xinzheng, Zhengzhou		Island	Underground	28 December 2023
Baqian	八千	Xinzheng, Zhengzhou		Island	Underground	28 December 2023
Shuangmiaoli	双庙李	Changge, Xuchang		Dual-island	Elevated	28 December 2023
Dazhou	大周	Changge, Xuchang		Island	Elevated	28 December 2023
Yingchuan Lu	颖川路	Changge, Xuchang		Side	Elevated	28 December 2023
Getianyuan	葛天源	Changge, Xuchang		Side	Elevated	28 December 2023
Yonghe Lu	永和路	Changge, Xuchang		Side	Elevated	28 December 2023
Nongda Lu	农大路	Jian'an, Xuchang		Side	Elevated	28 December 2023
Xuchang Sports Center	体育中心	Jian'an, Xuchang		Side	Elevated	28 December 2023
Dianqigu	电气谷	Jian'an, Xuchang		Side	Elevated	28 December 2023
Furonghu	芙蓉湖	Jian'an, Xuchang		Side	Elevated	28 December 2023
Luminghu	鹿鸣湖	Jian'an, Xuchang		Island	Underground	28 December 2023
Xuchangdong	许昌东站	Jian'an, Xuchang	China Railway	Island	Underground	28 December 2023
