= Tongle station =

Tongle station (Chinese: 同乐站) may refer to the following stations:

- Tongle station (Zhengzhou Metro), a metro station on Line 3 and Line 8 (Zhengzhou Metro), China
- Tongle station (Chengdu Metro), a metro station on Line 8 (Chengdu Metro), China
