= Zhengzhou Financial Island =

Artificial island in Henan, China

Native name: 郑州金融岛
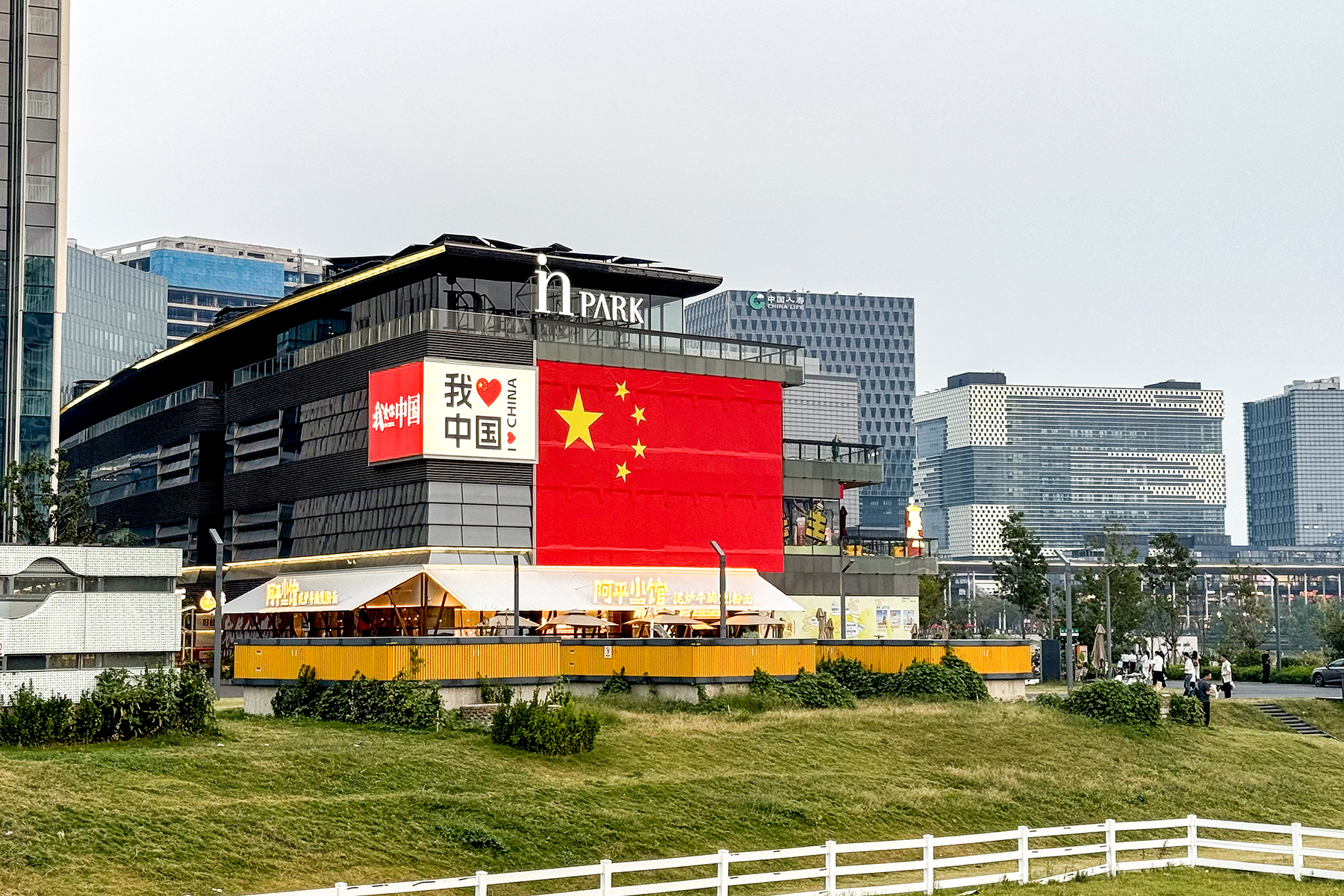
- Interactive map of Zhengzhou Financial Island

Geography
- Location: Central Longhu Lake, Zhengdong New Area, Zhengzhou, Henan Province
- Coordinates: 34°48′49″N 113°43′40″E
- Adjacent to: Longhu Lake
- Area: 1.07 km^{2} (0.41 sq mi)

Zhengzhou Financial Island (Chinese: 郑州金融岛, Pinyin: Zhèngzhōu Jīnróng Dǎo), also known as Longhu Financial Island (Chinese: 龙湖金融岛), is located in the center of Longhu, an artificial lake in Zhengdong New Area, Zhengzhou City, Henan Province. It is circular in shape, covers an area of approximately 1.07 square kilometers, and serves as the Zhengdong New District's regional financial center. Zhengzhou Financial Island is an urban architectural complex formed by 44 high-rise buildings arranged in inner and outer rings.

== History ==
On October 18, 2012, the Longhu water storage project commenced. In the second half of 2017, construction officially began on the outer ring project of the Financial Island. In the second half of 2020, the 20 office buildings of the Financial Island's inner ring were completed and delivered. In January 2022, the Zhengdong New District Autonomous Driving Line 1 entered the Financial Island and established stops. On March 1, 2022, Jinhang Island South Station and Jinhang Island North Station on Zhengzhou Metro Line 4 began operation. On March 4, 2022 (the second day of the second lunar month, known as the Longtaitou "Dragon Raises Its Head"), an opening ceremony was held for Longhu Financial Island, officially opening it to the public.

By December 2024, all 20 office buildings in the Financial Island's inner ring had been completed, along with five buildings in the outer ring, and the main structures of eight buildings in the outer ring had been topped out, with construction entering a final sprint phase. On October 21, 2025, the steel box girder of the North Canal pedestrian bridge on the Financial Island was joined. By March 2026, 22 buildings in the outer ring and 20 financial buildings in the inner ring stood around the lake, with the island's total construction area reaching approximately 3.2 million square meters.

== Transportation ==
Metro Line 4 has Jinrong Island South Station and Jinrong Island North Station on the island, which is also served by autonomous buses.

== See also ==
- Zhengdong New Area
- Zhengzhou Metro Line 4
