= Line 4 (Zhengzhou Metro) =

Metro line in Zhengzhou, China

- 4
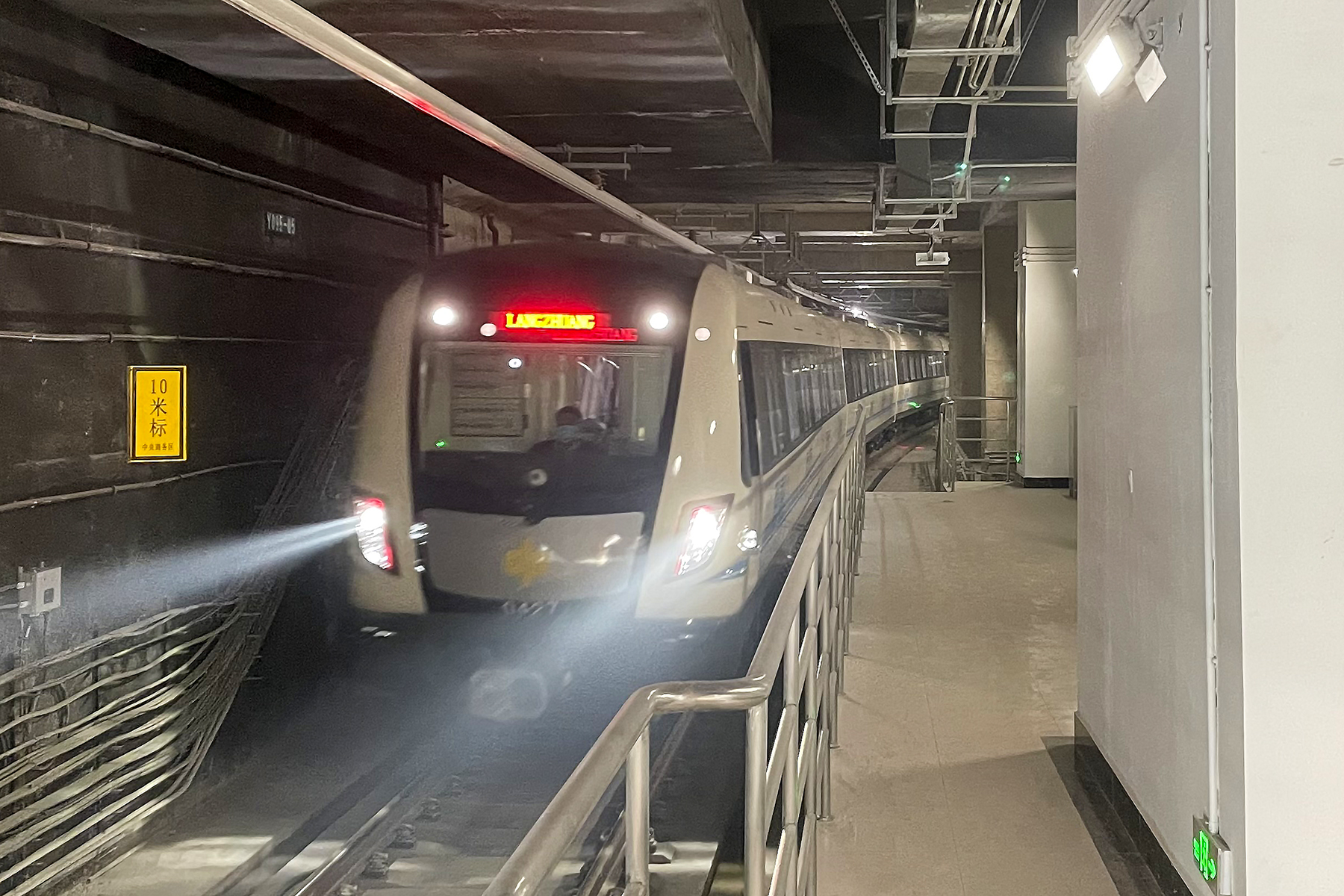
- Train 0427 approaching Central Business District station

Overview
- Status: Operating
- Owner: Zhengzhou
- Locale: Zhengzhou, Henan, China
- Termini: Laoyachen; Langzhuang
- Stations: 27

Service
- Type: Rapid transit
- System: Zhengzhou Metro
- Operator(s): Zhengzhou Metro Group Corporation

History
- Opened: 26 December 2020; 5 years ago

Technical
- Line length: 29.287 km (18.198 mi)
- Number of tracks: 2
- Character: Underground
- Track gauge: 1,435 mm (4 ft 8 1/2 in)
- Electrification: Overhead lines (1500 volts)

Line 4 of Zhengzhou Metro (Chinese: 郑州地铁4号线; pinyin: zhèngzhōu dìtiě sìhào xiàn) is a rapid transit line in Zhengzhou. It opened on December 26, 2020.

== Stations ==
Station No.	Station name		Connections	Distance km	Location
Station No.	English	Chinese	Connections	Distance km	Location
0421	Laoyachen	老鸦陈			Huiji
0422	Henan Sports Center	省体育中心	3		Huiji
0423	Beiershilipu	北二十里铺			Jinshui
0424	Fengqing Lu	丰庆路			Jinshui
0425	Zhangjiacun	张家村	7		Jinshui
0426	Chenzhai Dong	陈寨东			Jinshui
0427	Shamen	沙门	2		Jinshui
0428	Yangjunliu	杨君刘			Jinshui
0429	Senlin Gongyuan Bei	森林公园北			Jinshui
0430	Qinghua Fuzhong	清华附中	6		Jinshui
0431	Longhu Zhonghuan Bei	龙湖中环北			Jinshui
0432	Longhu Bei	龙湖北			Jinshui
0433	Jinrongdao Bei	金融岛北			Jinshui
0434	Jinrongdao Nan	金融岛南			Jinshui
0435	Longhu Nan	龙湖南			Jinshui
0436	Longhu Zhonghuan Nan	龙湖中环南	8		Jinshui
0437	Nongye Donglu	农业东路			Jinshui
0438	Central Business District	中央商务区	5		Jinshui
0439	Convention and Exhibition Center	会展中心	1		Jinshui
0440	Shangding Lu	商鼎路			Jinshui
0441	Dongshilipu	东十里铺	3		Jinshui
0442	Huozhan Jie	货站街			Jinshui
0443	Qilihe	七里河	5		Guancheng
0444	Guoshusuo	果树所			Guancheng
0445	Jindai	金岱			Guancheng
0446	Yaozhuang	姚庄			Guancheng
0447	Langzhuang	郎庄			Guancheng

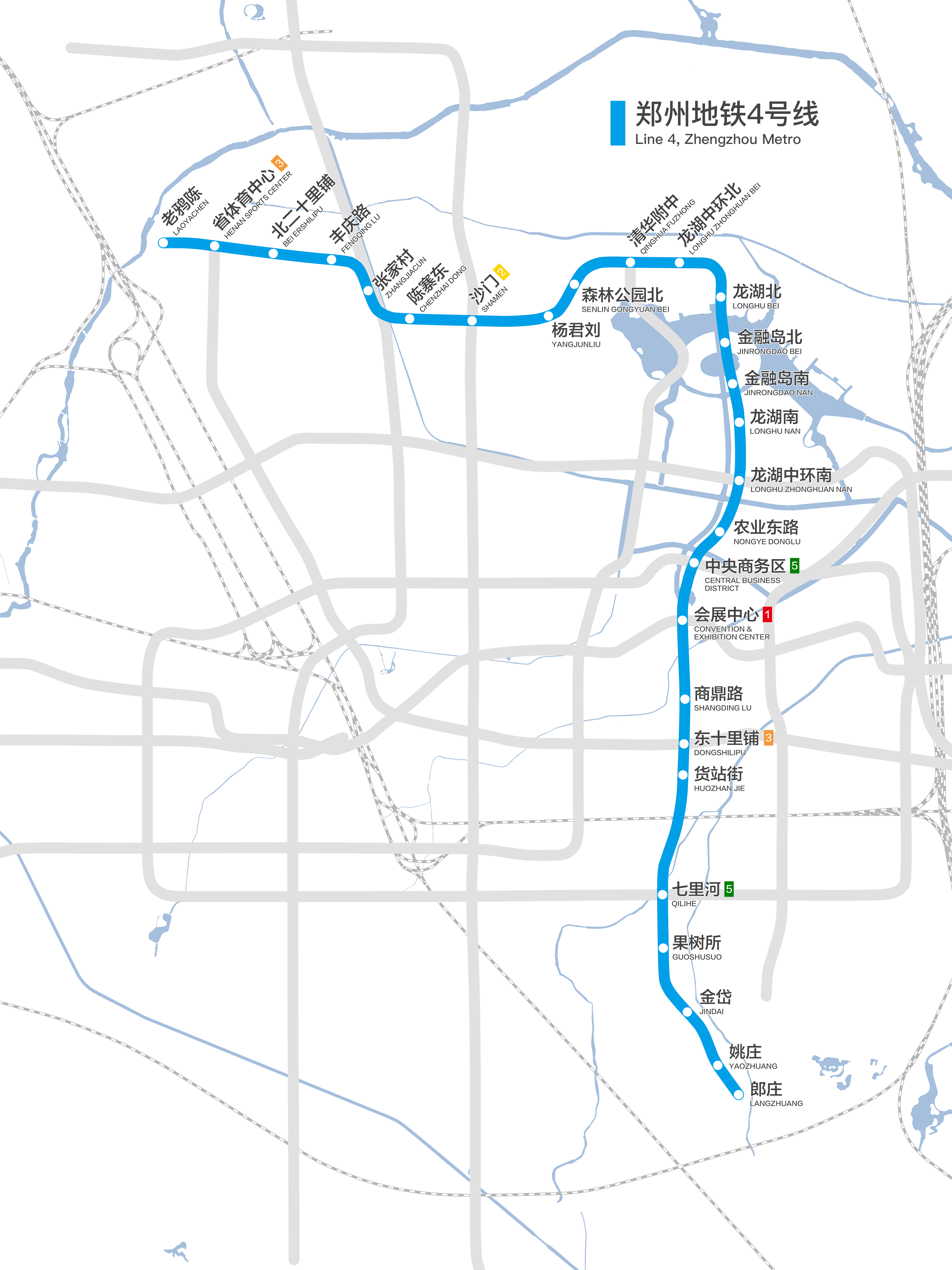
Map of Zhengzhou Metro Line 4.
