= Children's Hospital station =

Metro station in Zhengzhou, China

Children's Hospital 儿童医院
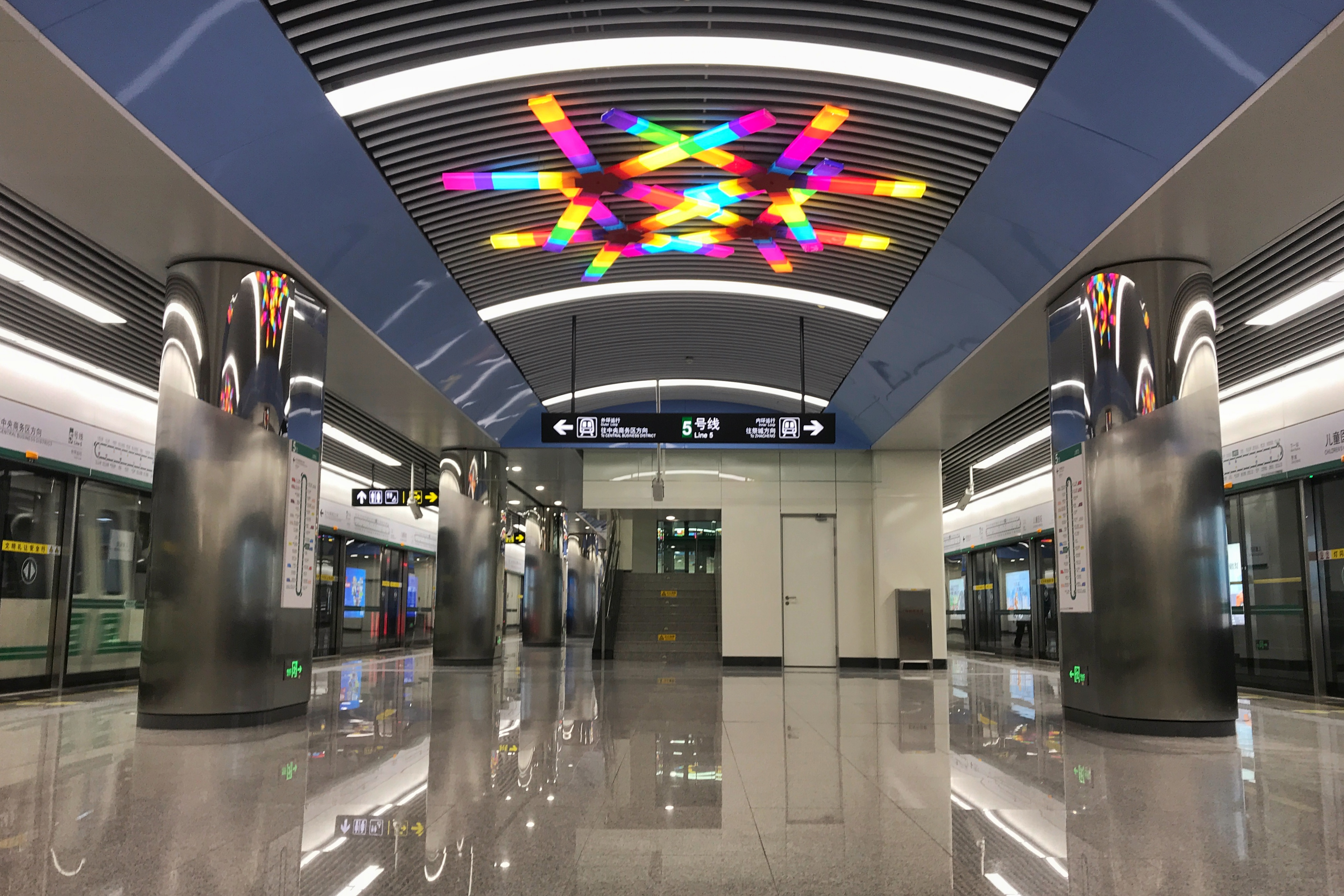
- Line 5 platform

General information
- Location: Nongye E. Road × Ping'an Avenue; Jinshui, Zhengzhou; China
- Coordinates: 34.7769°N 113.7452°E
- System: Zhengzhou Metro rapid transit station
- Operator: Zhengzhou Metro
- Lines: Line 5; Line 12
- Platforms: 2 (1 island platform)
- Connections: Bus

Construction
- Structure type: Underground

Other information
- Status: Operational
- Station code: 510

History
- Opened: 20 May 2019

Services
Preceding station	Zhengzhou Metro	Following station
Zhacheng inner loop	Line 5	Central Business District outer loop
Location
- Location within Zhengzhou

Children's Hospital (Chinese: 儿童医院) is a metro station of Zhengzhou Metro Line 5 and Line 12.

The station was opened on 20 May 2019.

== Station layout ==
The station has two levels underground, The B1 level is for the concourse and the B2 level is for the single island platform of Line 5.

G	-	Exits
B1	Concourse	Customer Service, vending machines
B2; Platforms		← Line 5 inner loop (Zhacheng)
B2; Platforms	Island platform, doors will open on the left
B2; Platforms		Line 5 outer loop (Central Business District) →

== Exits ==
The station currently has 2 exits.

Exit	Sign	Destinations	Bus connections
C	Nongyedong Lu (W)	Zhengzhou Yihe Hospital	48, 166, S131
D	Nongyedong Lu (E)	Henan Children's Hospital	205, S131
