= Central Business District station (Zhengzhou Metro) =

Metro station in Zhengzhou, China

Central Business District 中央商务区
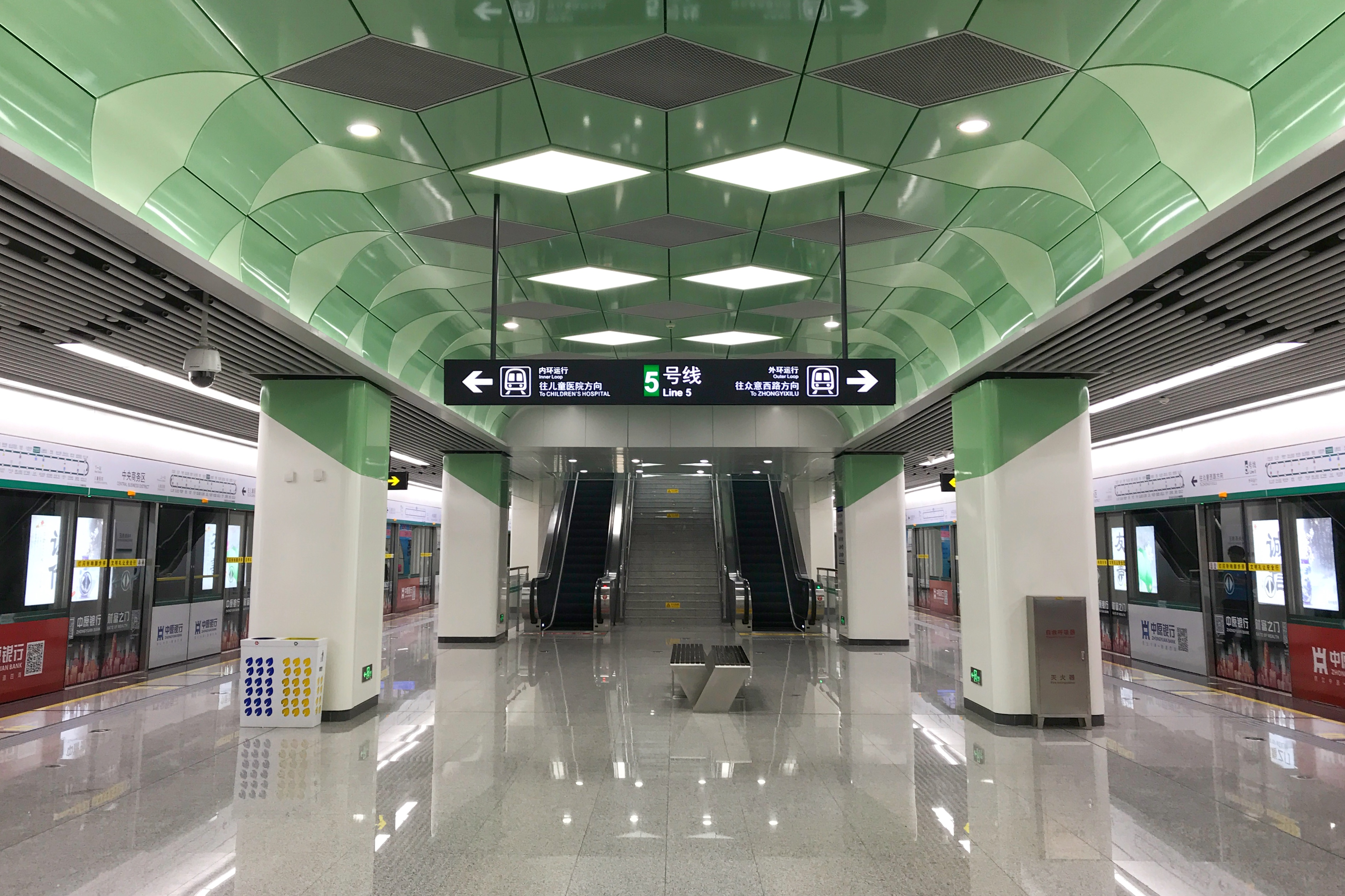
- Platforms for Line 5

General information
- Location: Shangwu Outer Ring Road × Shangwu East 2 Street; Jinshui, Zhengzhou; China
- Coordinates: 34.7790°N 113.7258°E
- System: Zhengzhou Metro rapid transit station
- Operator: Zhengzhou Metro
- Lines: Line 4; Line 5
- Platforms: 4 (2 island platforms)
- Connections: Bus

Construction
- Structure type: Underground

Other information
- Status: Operational
- Station code: 509

History
- Opened: 20 May 2019

Services
Preceding station	Zhengzhou Metro	Following station
Nongyedonglu towards Laoyachen	Line 4	Convention and Exhibition Center towards Langzhuang
Children's Hospital inner loop	Line 5	Zhongyixilu outer loop
Location
- Location within Zhengzhou

Central Business District (Chinese: 中央商务区) is a metro station of Zhengzhou Metro Line 4 and Line 5. The station is located in the northern part of Zhengdong New Area CBD, near Zhengdong Wetland Park.

== History ==
The station was opened on 20 May 2019.

== Station layout ==
The station has three levels underground, The B1 level is for the concourse, the B2 level is for the Line 5 platforms and the B3 level is for the Line 4 platforms.

G	-	Exits
B1	Concourse	Customer Service, vending machines
B2		← Line 5 outer loop (Zhongyixilu)
B2	Island platform, doors will open on the left
B2		Line 5 inner loop (Children's Hospital) →
B3		← Line 4 towards Laoyachen (Nongyedonglu)
B3	Island platform, doors will open on the left
B3		Line 4 towards Langzhuang (Convention and Exhibition Center) →

== Exits ==
The station currently has 4 exits.

Exit	Sign	Destinations	Bus connections
A1	Shangwu Donger Jie (E)	People's Bank of China Zhengzhou Branch	186, 206, 232, 23, 265, 26, B53, Y23
A2	Shangwu Waihuan Lu (N)	Henan Nongxin Building	186, 195, 232, 188, 312, 47, 75
B	Shangwu Waihuan Lu (S)	Zhengzhou Television Station, Novotel Zhengzhou Convention Centre Hotel	186, 206, 232, 23, 265, 26, B53, Y23
H	Shangwu Waihuan Lu (N)		188, 312, 47, 75
