= Line 6 (Zhengzhou Metro) =

Metro line in Zhengzhou, China

- 6
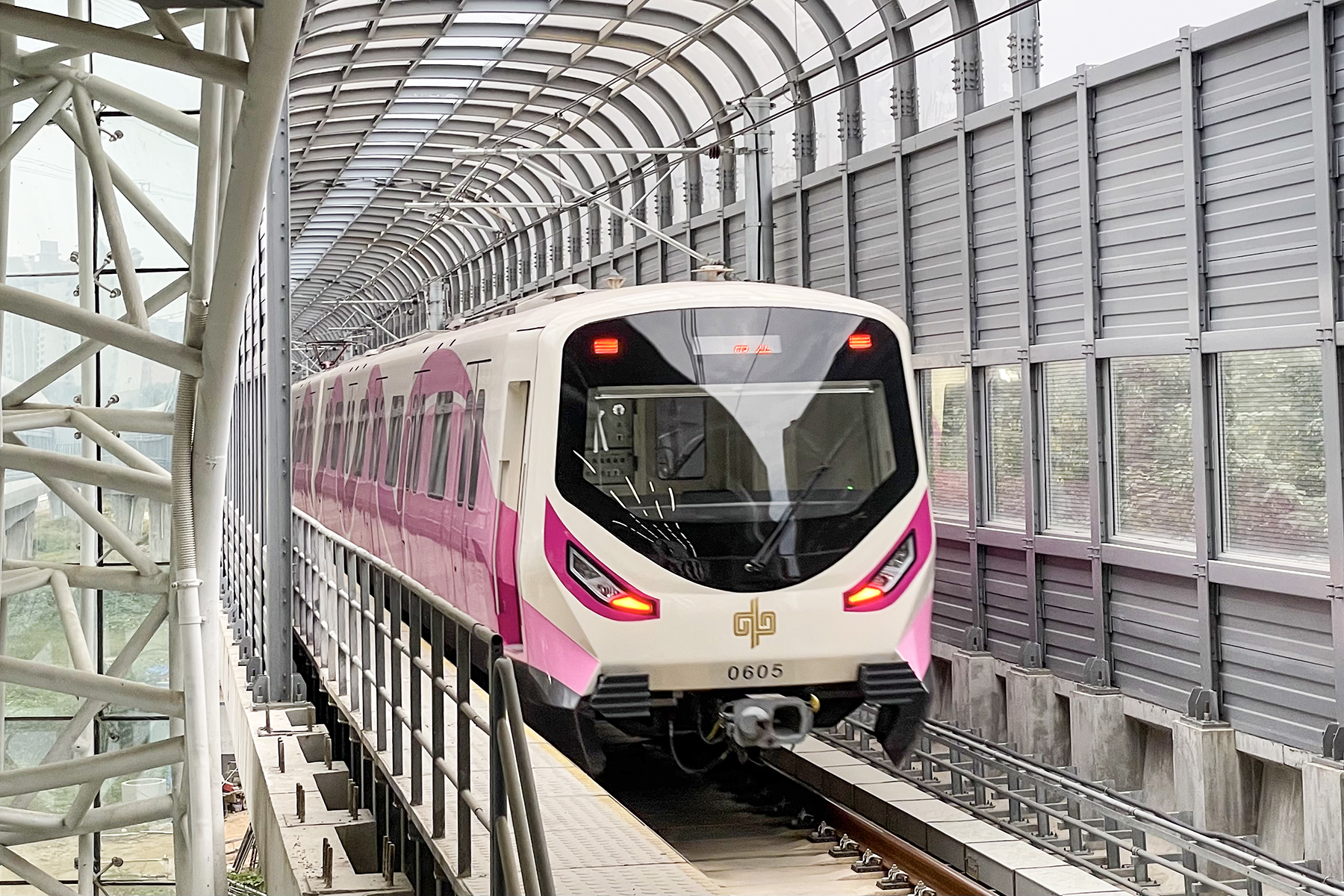
- Train 0605 leaving Donglinhu station

Overview
- Status: In operation
- Owner: Zhengzhou
- Locale: Zhengzhou, Henan, China
- Termini: Jiayu; Qinghua Fuzhong
- Stations: 28

Service
- Type: Rapid transit
- System: Zhengzhou Metro
- Operator: Zhengzhou Metro Group Corporation
- Rolling stock: 6-car Type A

History
- Opened: 30 September 2022; 3 years ago

Technical
- Number of tracks: 2
- Character: Underground and elevated
- Track gauge: 1,435 mm (4 ft 8 1/2 in)
- Operating speed: 80 km/h

Line 6 of Zhengzhou Metro (Chinese: 郑州地铁6号线; pinyin: zhèngzhōu dìtiě liùhào xiàn) is a rapid transit line in Zhengzhou, Henan Province, China. The line uses 6-car Type A trains.

== History ==
=== West section of Phase 1 ===
The West section of Phase 1 is 16.7 km in length with 10 stations, from Jiayu to Changzhuang. The section opened on 30 September 2022.

=== East section of Phase 1 ===
The 18-station, 26.4 km long section from Changzhuang to Qinghua Fuzhong opened on 30 November 2024.

== Opening timeline ==
Segment	Commencement	Length	Station(s)	Name
Jiayu — Changzhuang	30 September 2022	16.7 km	9	west section of Phase 1
Jinzhenlu	16 January 2023		1	infill station
Changzhuang — Qinghuafuzhong	30 November 2024	26.4 km	18	east section of Phase 1

== Stations ==
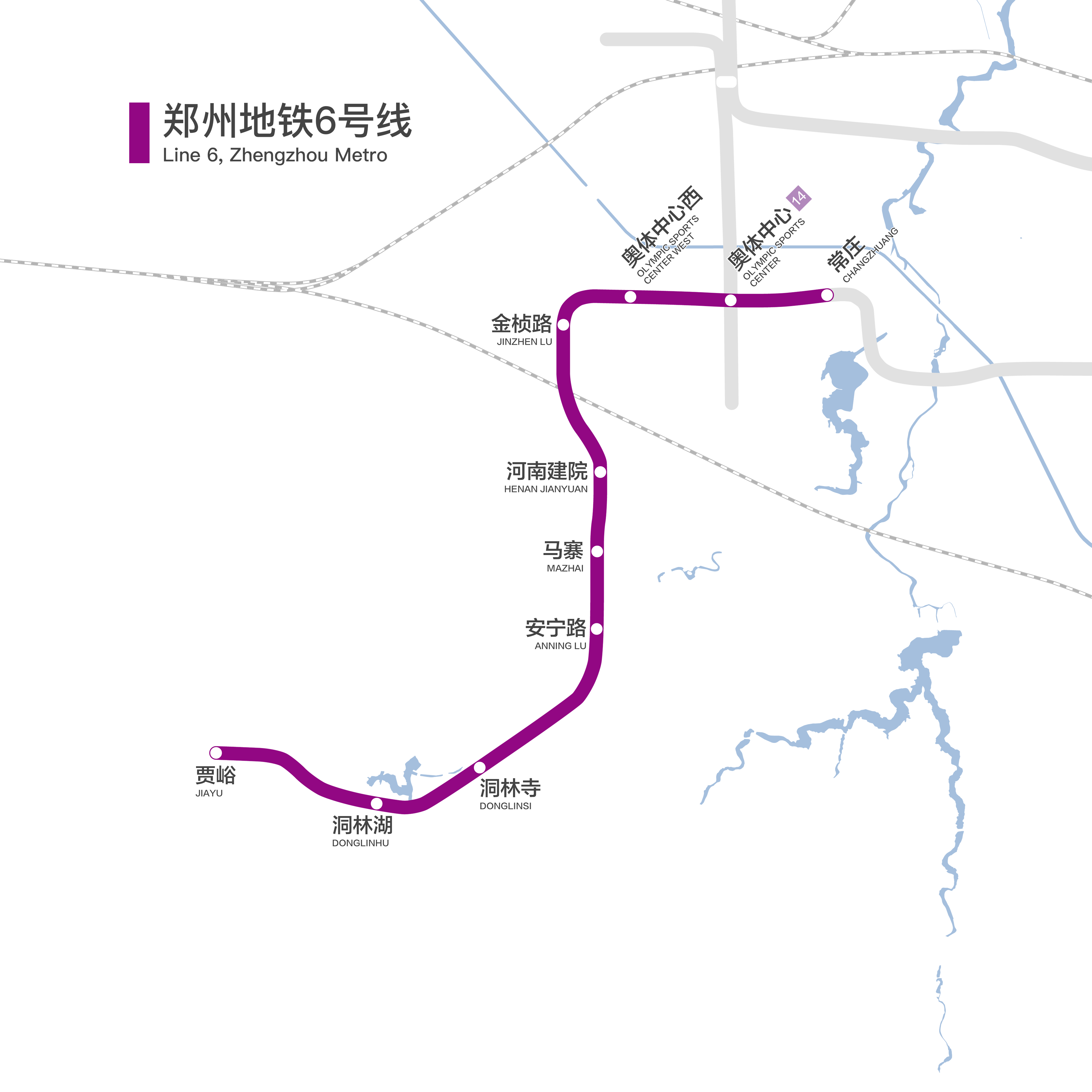
Map of Zhengzhou Metro Line 6. (outdated, without Qinghua Fuzhong extension)

Station No.	Station name		Connections	Distance km	Location
Station No.	English	Chinese	Connections	Distance km	Location
0649	Jiayu	贾峪			Xingyang
0648	Donglinhu	洞林湖			Xingyang
0647	Donglinsi	洞林寺			Xingyang
0646	Anning Lu	安宁路			Erqi
0645	Mazhai	马寨			Erqi
0644	Henan Jianyuan	河南建院			Erqi
0643	Jinzhen Lu	金桢路			Zhongyuan
0642	Olympic Sports Center West	奥体中心西			Zhongyuan
0641	Olympic Sports Center	奥体中心	14		Zhongyuan
0640	Changzhuang	常庄			Zhongyuan
0639	Fengwan	冯湾			Zhongyuan
0638	Lijianggou	李江沟			Zhongyuan
0637	Wolonggang	卧龙岗			Zhongyuan
0636	Tonghuai	桐淮	5		Zhongyuan
0635	Songhuai	嵩淮			Erqi
0634	Daxue Zhonglu	大学中路	7		Erqi
0633	Huochetou Tiyuchang	火车头体育场			Erqi
0632	Longxiu Gongyuan	陇秀公园			Erqi
0631	Erligang	二里岗	2		Guancheng
0630	Erligang Dong	二里岗东			Guancheng
0629	Fenghuangtai Nan	凤凰台南			Guancheng
0628	Bolan Zhongxin	博览中心	3		Jinshui
0627	Yanzhuang	燕庄	1		Jinshui
0626	Yaozhai	姚砦	5		Jinshui
0625	Jinhuiqiao	金汇桥			Jinshui
0624	Xiaoying	小营	8		Jinshui
0623	Jinrongdao Xi	金融岛西			Jinshui
0622	Qinghua Fuzhong	清华附中	4		Jinshui
