= Line 3 (Zhengzhou Metro) =

Metro line in Zhengzhou, China

- 3
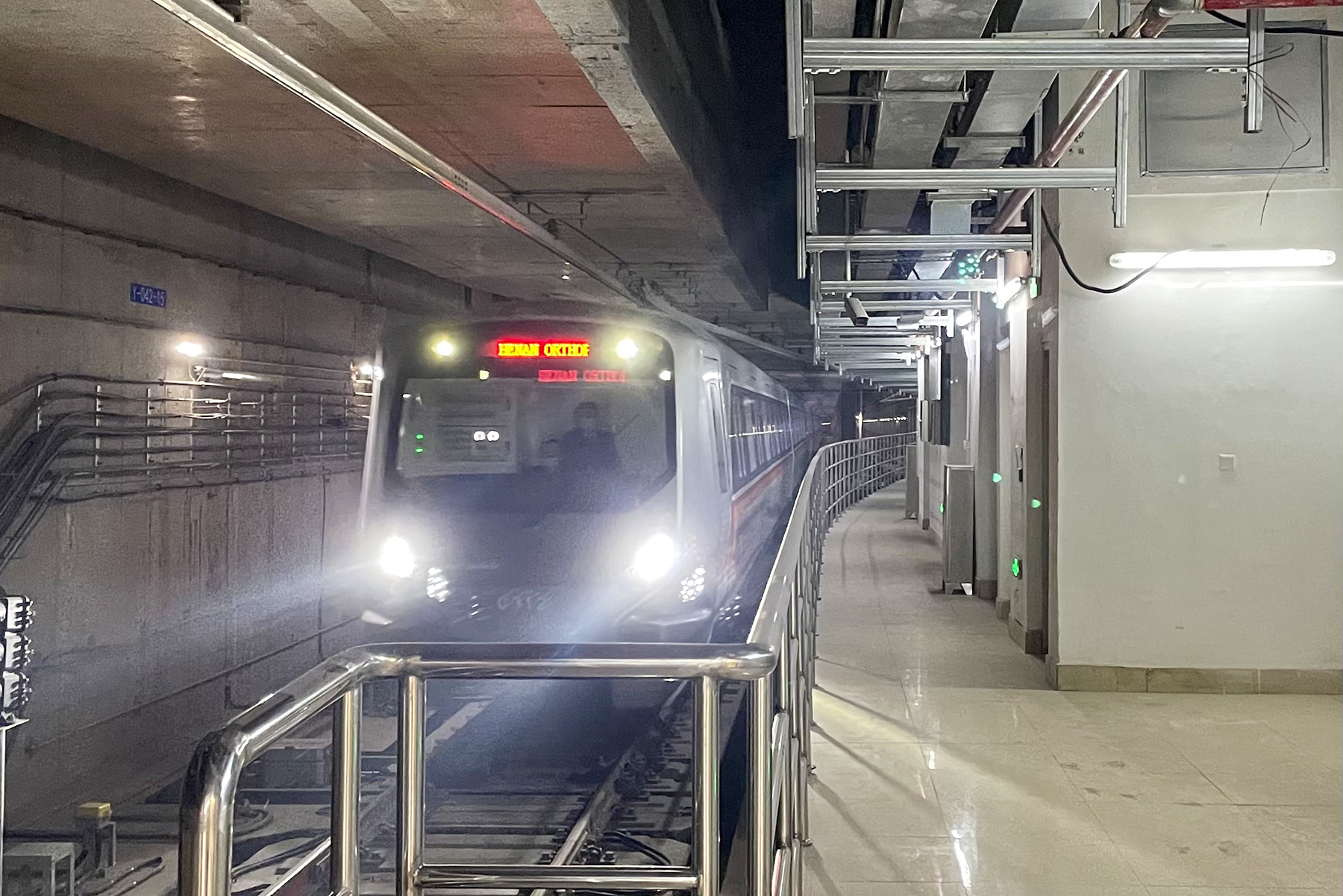
- Train 0312 approaching Haitansi station

Overview
- Status: Operating
- Owner: Zhengzhou
- Locale: Zhengzhou, Henan, China
- Termini: Henan Sports Center; Binhe Xincheng Nan
- Stations: 25

Service
- Type: Rapid transit
- System: Zhengzhou Metro
- Operator(s): Zhengzhou China Construction Shenzhen Railway Rail Transit Co., Ltd (A joint venture between China State Construction Engineering, Shenzhen Metro Group and Zhengzhou Jiaotong Investment.)

History
- Opened: 26 December 2020; 5 years ago

Technical
- Line length: 31.804 km (19.762 mi)
- Number of tracks: 2
- Character: Underground
- Track gauge: 1,435 mm (4 ft 8 1/2 in)
- Electrification: Overhead lines (1500 volts)

Line 3 of Zhengzhou Metro (Chinese: 郑州地铁3号线; pinyin: zhèngzhōu dìtiě sānhào xiàn) is a rapid transit line in Zhengzhou that runs in a northwest - southeast direction. The line uses six car Type A trains. The line opened on December 26, 2020.

Line 3 is operated by Zhengzhou China Construction Shenzhen Railway Rail Transit Co., Ltd (a joint venture between China State Construction Engineering, Shenzhen Metro Group and Zhengzhou Jiaotong Investment) with a registered capital of 1 billion RMB. The company was established on December 26, 2018; mainly responsible for the investment, financing, construction, operation and maintenance of Line 3.

== Opening timeline ==
Segment	Commencement	Length	Station(s)	Name
Henan Sports Center — Henan Orthopaedics Hospital	26 December 2020	25.488 km (15.8 mi)	19	Phase 1
Henan Orthopaedics Hospital — Yinggang	26 June 2021	25.488 km (15.8 mi)	2	Phase 1
Yinggang — Binhe Xincheng Nan	8 September 2023	6.316 km (3.9 mi)	4	Phase 2

== Stations ==
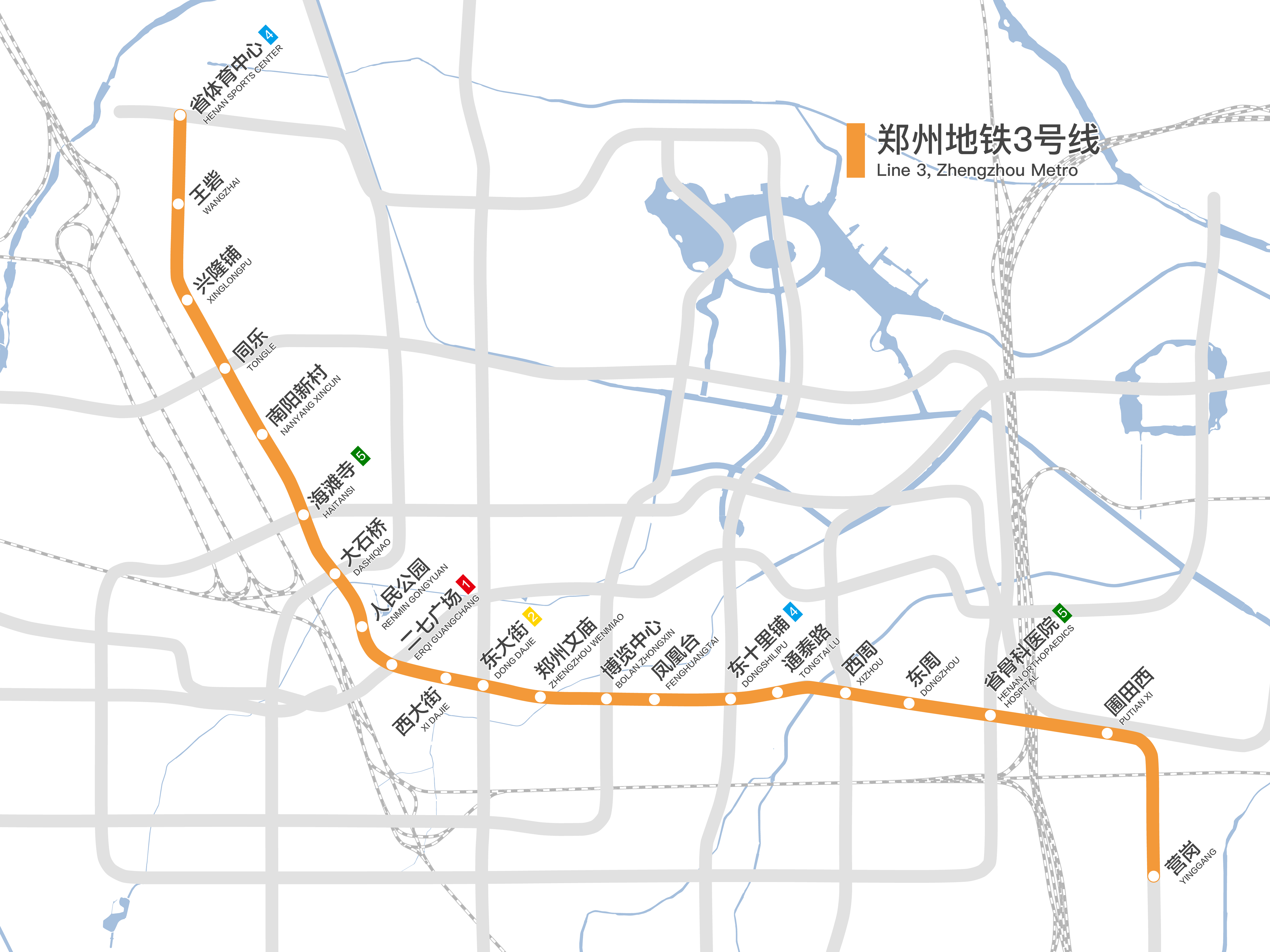
Map of Zhengzhou Metro Line 3 (outdated).

Station №	Station name		Connections	Distance km	Location
Station №	English	Chinese	Connections	Distance km	Location
0321	Henan Sports Center	省体育中心	4		Huiji
0322	Wangzhai	王砦			Huiji
0323	Xinglongpu	兴隆铺			Huiji
0324	Tongle	同乐	8		Jinshui
0325	Nanyang Xincun	南阳新村			Jinshui
0326	Haitansi	海滩寺	5		Jinshui
0327	Dashiqiao	大石桥	7		Jinshui
0328	Renmin Gongyuan	人民公园			Erqi
0329	Erqi Guangchang	二七广场	1		Erqi
0330	Xi Dajie	西大街			Guancheng
0331	Dong Dajie	东大街	2		Guancheng
0332	Zhengzhou Wenmiao	郑州文庙			Guancheng
0333	Bolan Zhongxin	博览中心	6		Guancheng
0334	Fenghuangtai	凤凰台			Jinshui
0335	Dongshilipu	东十里铺	4		Jinshui
0336	Tongtailu	通泰路			Jinshui
0337	Xizhou	西周	12		Guancheng
0338	Dongzhou	东周			Guancheng
0339	Henan Orthopaedics Hospital	省骨科医院	5		Guancheng
0340	Putian Xi	圃田西	8		Guancheng
0341	Yinggang	营岗			Guancheng
0342	Chaohe	潮河			Guancheng
0343	Binhe Xincheng	滨河新城			Guancheng
0344	Sizhao	司赵			Guancheng
0345	Binhe Xincheng Nan	滨河新城南			Guancheng
