= Zhengzhou Renminyiyuan station =

Metro station in Zhengzhou, China

Zhengzhou Renminyiyuan 郑州人民医院
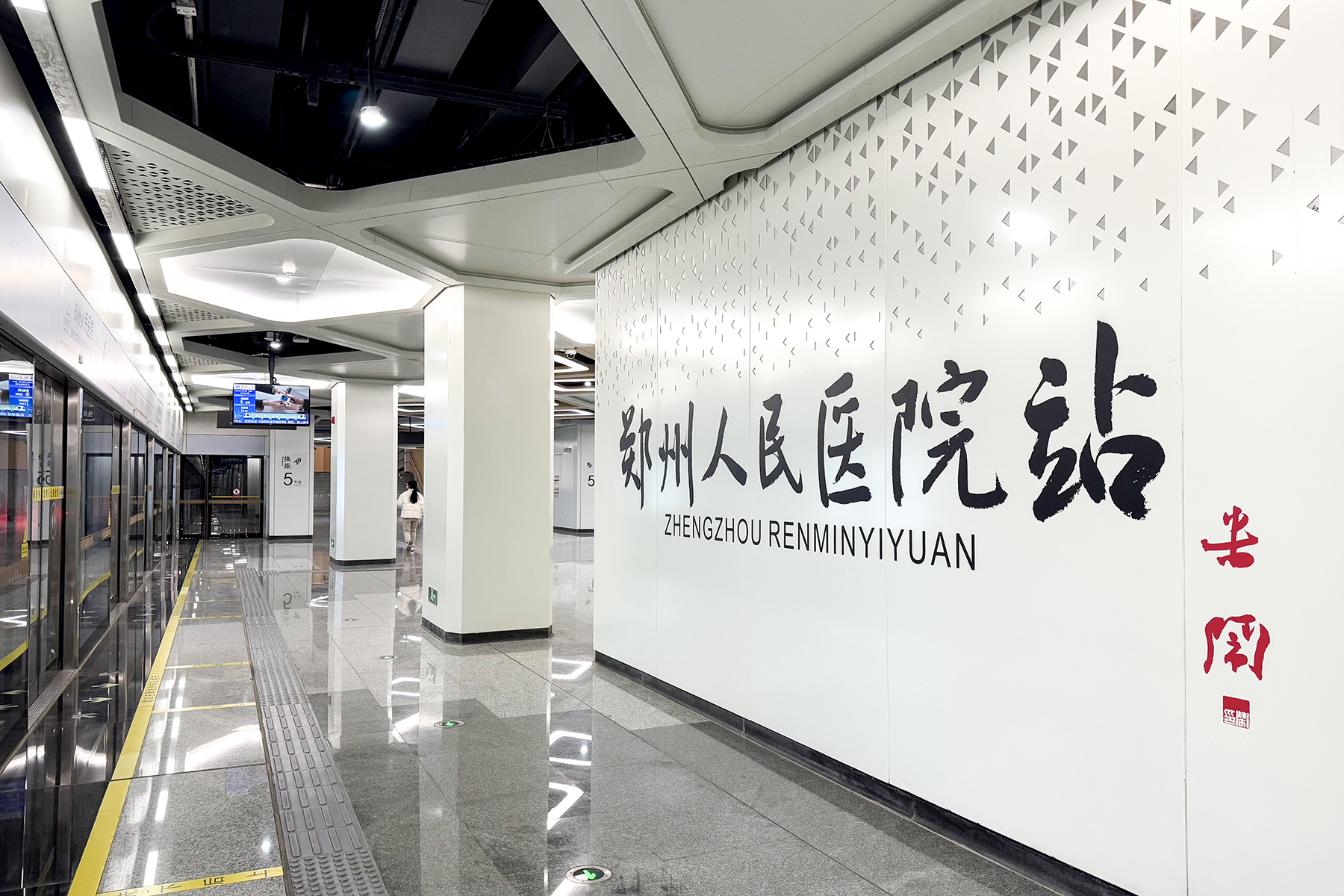
- Platform of Line 7

Chinese name
- Simplified Chinese: 郑州人民医院站
- Traditional Chinese: 鄭州人民醫院站
Transcriptions
Standard Mandarin
- Hanyu Pinyin: Zhèngzhōu Rénmínyīyuàn Zhàn

General information
- Location: Huanghe Road × Wenhua Road; Jinshui District, Zhengzhou, Henan; China
- Coordinates: 34°46′32.5″N 113°39′39.2″E
- System: Zhengzhou Metro
- Lines: Line 5 Line 7
- Platforms: 4 (2 island platforms)
- Tracks: 4

Construction
- Structure type: Underground
- Platform levels: 2
- Accessible: Yes

History
- Opened: 20 May 2019 (Line 5); 29 December 2024 (Line 7)
- Former names: Zhengzhou People's Hospital (before Line 7 opened)

Services
Preceding station	Zhengzhou Metro	Following station
Huanghelu inner loop	Line 5	Haitansi outer loop
Nongye Daxue towards Dongzhao	Line 7	Dashiqiao towards Nangangliu
Location

Zhengzhou Renminyiyuan (Chinese: 郑州人民医院), formerly known as Zhengzhou People's Hospital, is an underground metro station on Line 5 and Line 7 of Zhengzhou Metro. It is located on the intersection of Huanghe Road and Wenhua Road in Jinshui District, Zhengzhou, China. It was opened on 20 May 2019, together with the rest of the stations on Line 5. The Line 7 began its service on 29 December 2024.

== Structure ==
The station has three levels underground. The basement 1 is for the concourse. The island platform for Line 5 is on basement 2 and the island platform for Line 7 is on basement 3. Stairs directly connecting two platforms is provided.

=== Entrances/exits ===
- A: south side of Huanghe Road, east side of Wenhua Road, Jingba Road (经八路)
- C: north side of Huanghe Road, Zhengzhou People's Hospital
- D: south side of Huanghe Road, Fengcai Street (丰彩街)
- E: east side of Wenhua Road, Hongqi Road, Zhengzhou People's Hospital (Wenhua Road Campus)

== Gallery ==
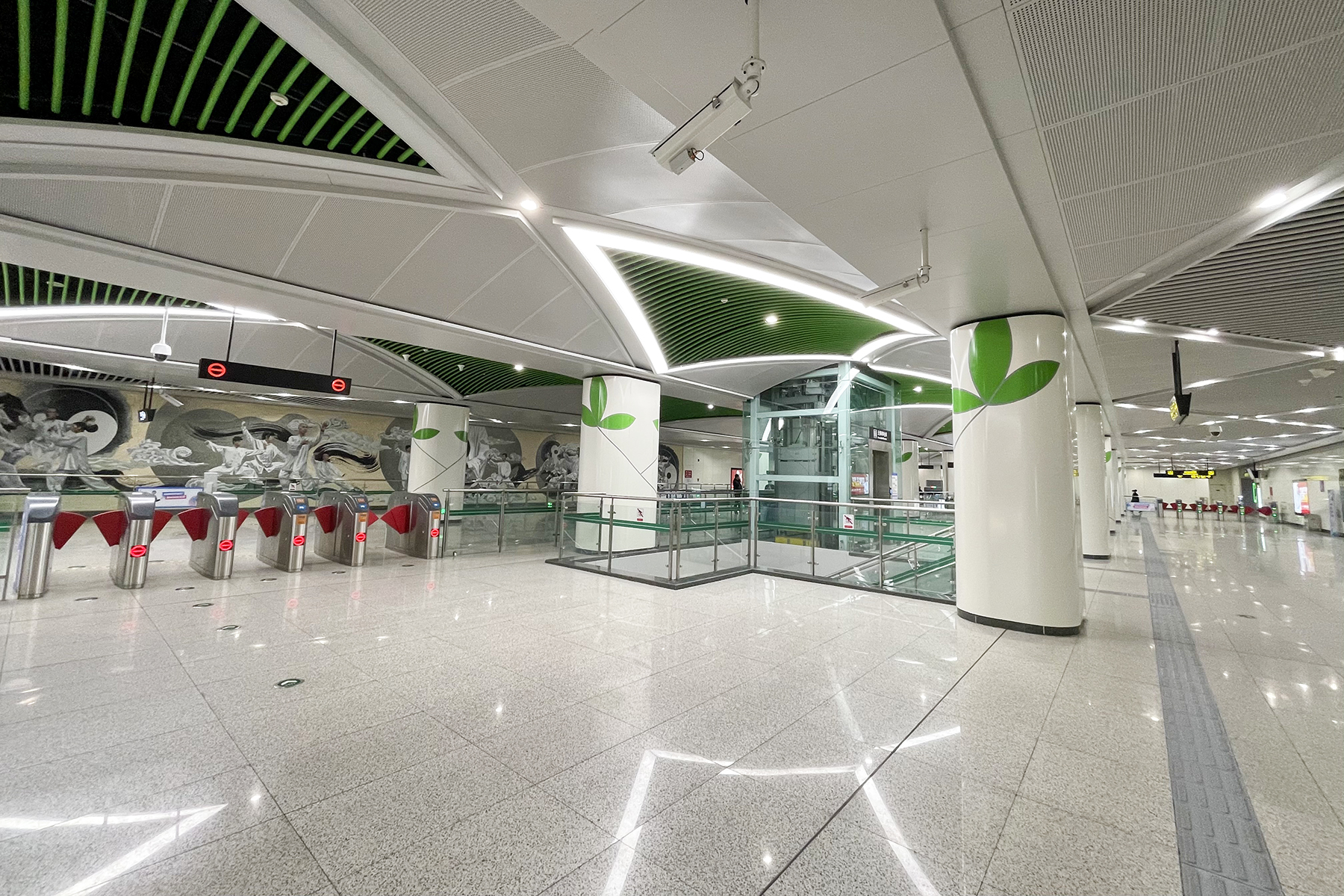
Line 5 concourse

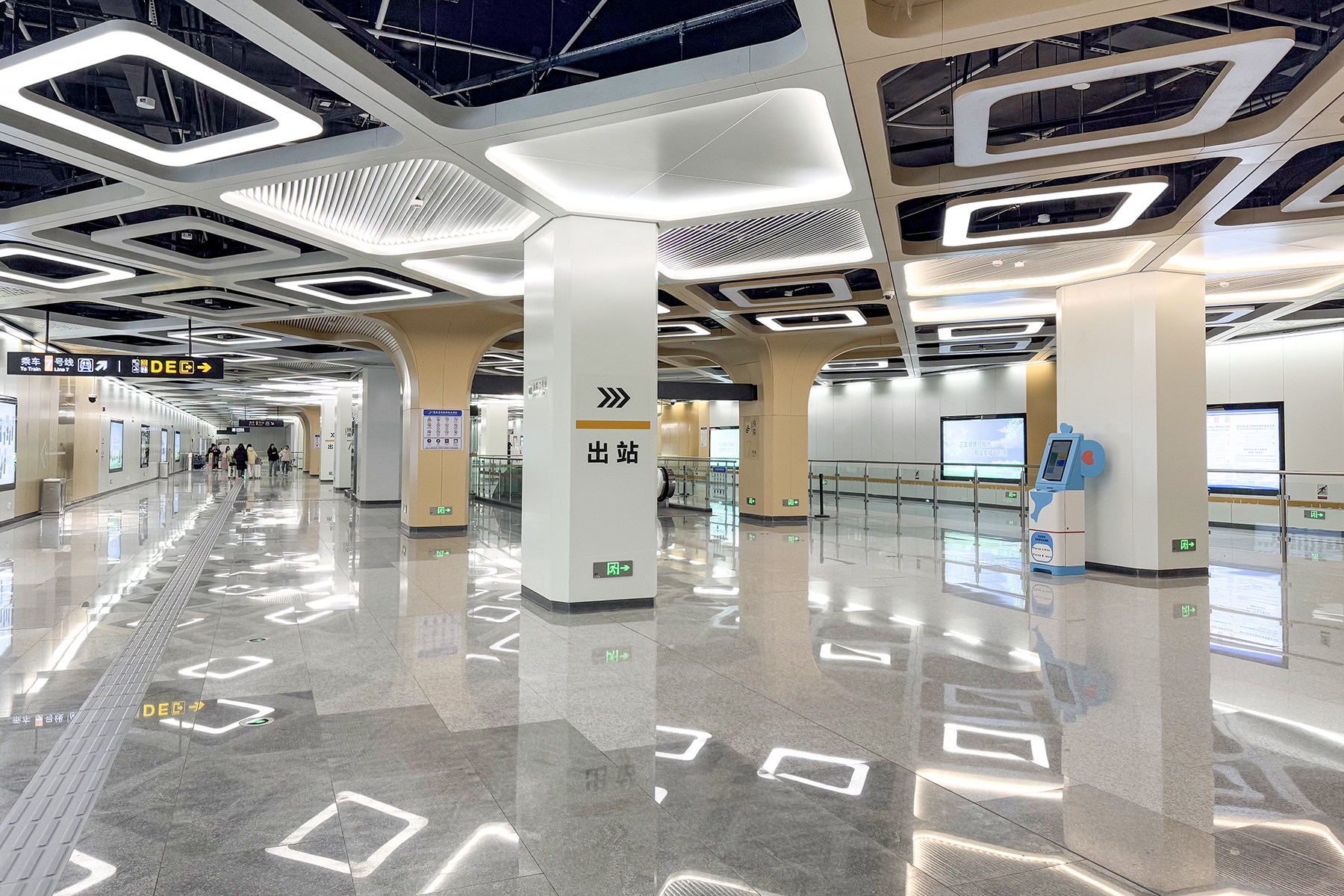
Line 7 concourse

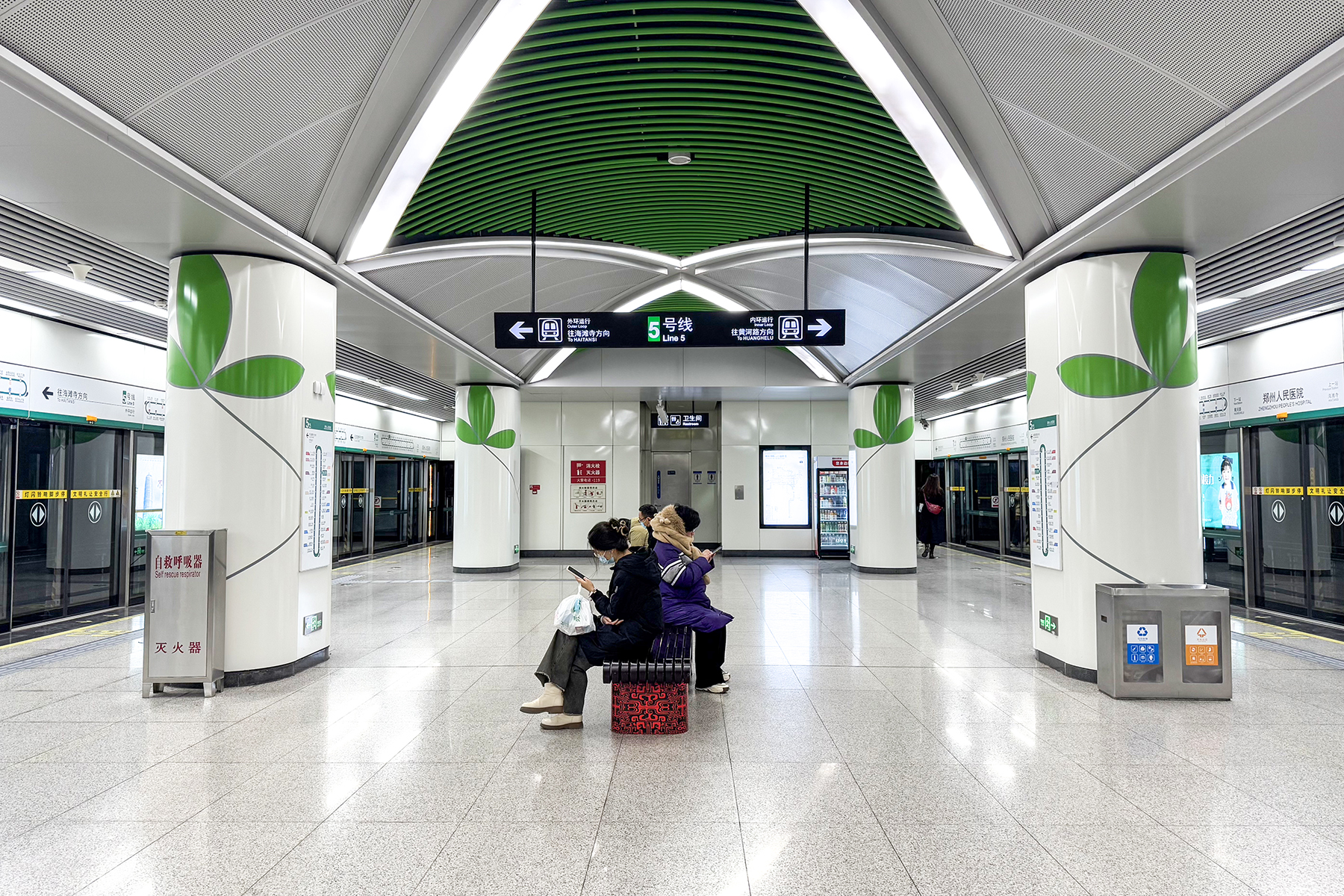
Line 5 platform

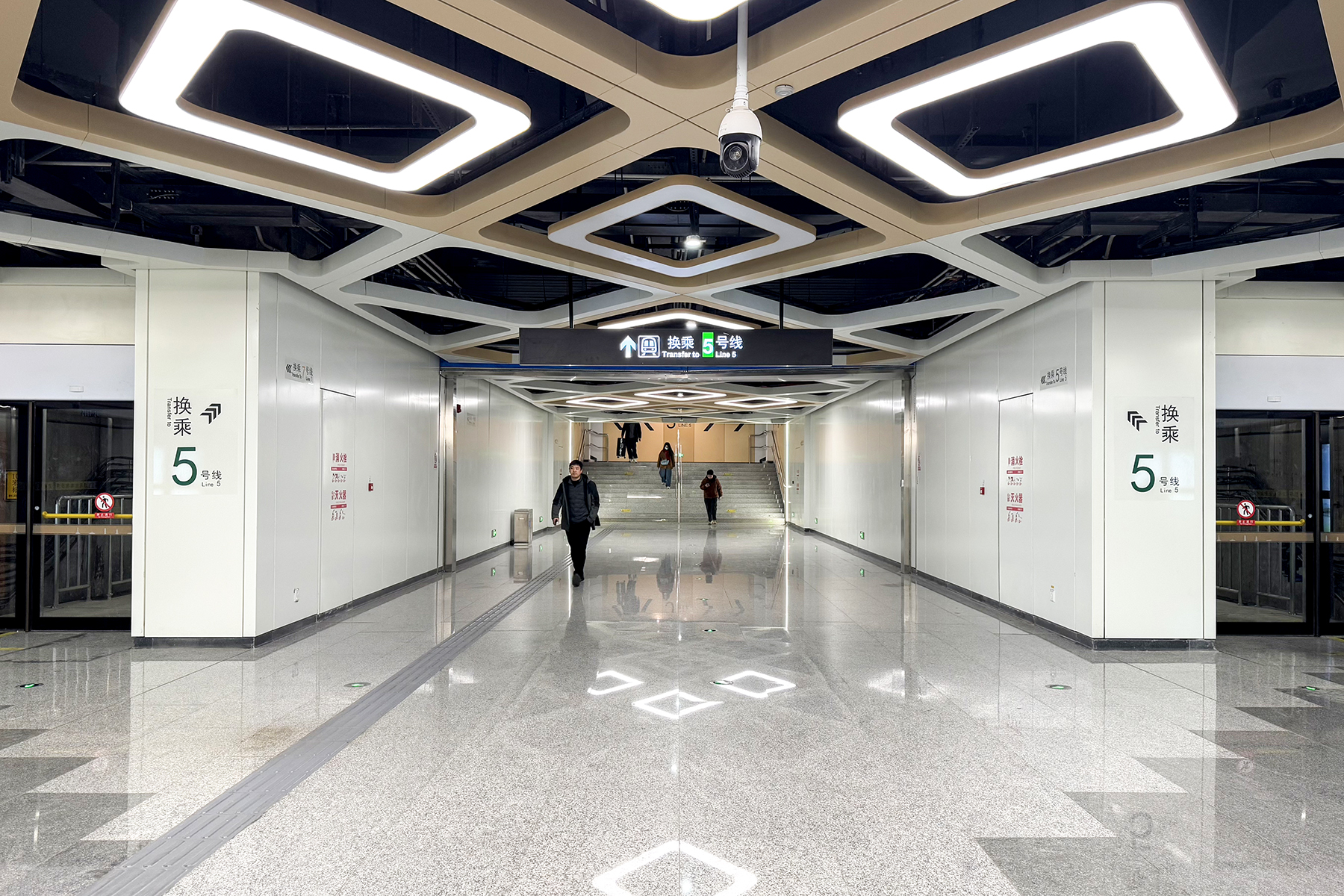
Transfer stairs on Line 7 platform
