= Henan People's Hospital station =

Metro station in Zhengzhou, China

Henan People's Hospital 省人民医院
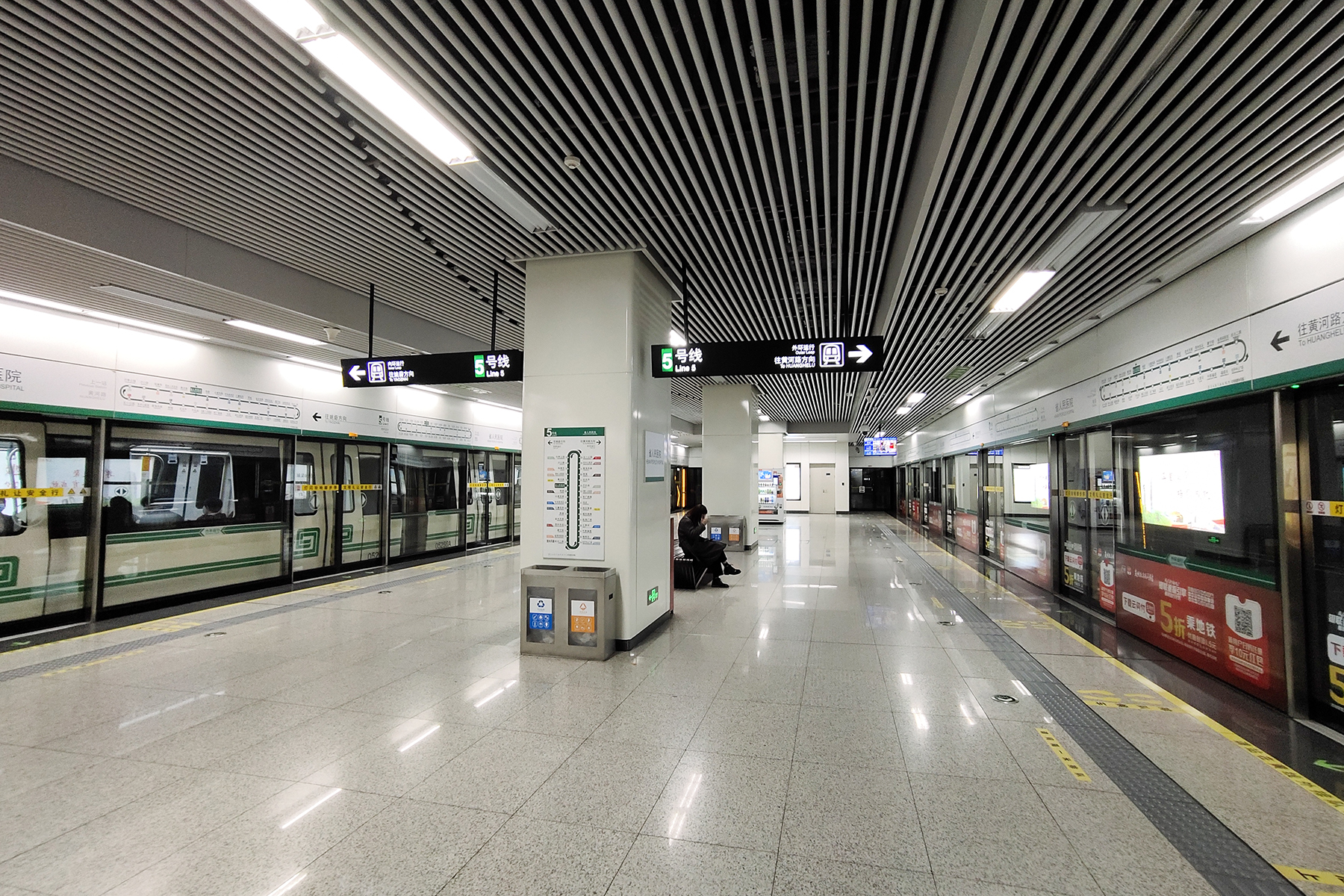
- Platform in 2020

General information
- Location: Huanghe Road × Jingsan Road; Jinshui, Zhengzhou; China
- Coordinates: 34.7746°N 113.6932°E
- System: Zhengzhou Metro rapid transit station
- Operator: Zhengzhou Metro
- Line: Line 5
- Platforms: 2 (1 island platform)
- Connections: Bus

Construction
- Structure type: Underground

Other information
- Status: Operational
- Station code: 506

History
- Opened: 20 May 2019

Services
Preceding station	Zhengzhou Metro	Following station
Yaozhai inner loop	Line 5	Huanghelu outer loop
Location
- Location within Zhengzhou

Henan People's Hospital (Chinese: 省人民医院) is a metro station of Zhengzhou Metro Line 5.

== History ==
The station was opened on 20 May 2019.

== Station layout ==
The station has two levels underground, The B1 level is for the concourse and the B2 level is for the single island platform of Line 5.

G	-	Exits
B1	Concourse	Customer Service, vending machines
B2; Platforms		← Line 5 outer loop (Huanghelu)
B2; Platforms	Island platform, doors will open on the left
B2; Platforms		Line 5 inner loop (Yaozhai) →

== Exits ==
The station currently has 5 exits.

No.	Sign	Destinations	Bus connections
A1	Huanghe Lu (S)	Henan Provincial People's Hospital	2, 23, 158, B15, B18, S128, S172
A2	Huanghe Lu (N) (Not in service)	North side of Huanghe Road, Jing'er Road	
B	Huanghe Lu (S)	South side of Huanghe Road	{47, 64, 77, 903, Y23, S172
C	Jingsan Lu (W)	North side of Huanghe Road	47, 64, 77, 903, Y23
D	Jingsan Lu (E)	North side of Huanghe Road.	2, 23, B15, B18, S128, S172
