= Luboyuan station =

Metro station in Zhengzhou, China

Luboyuan 绿博园
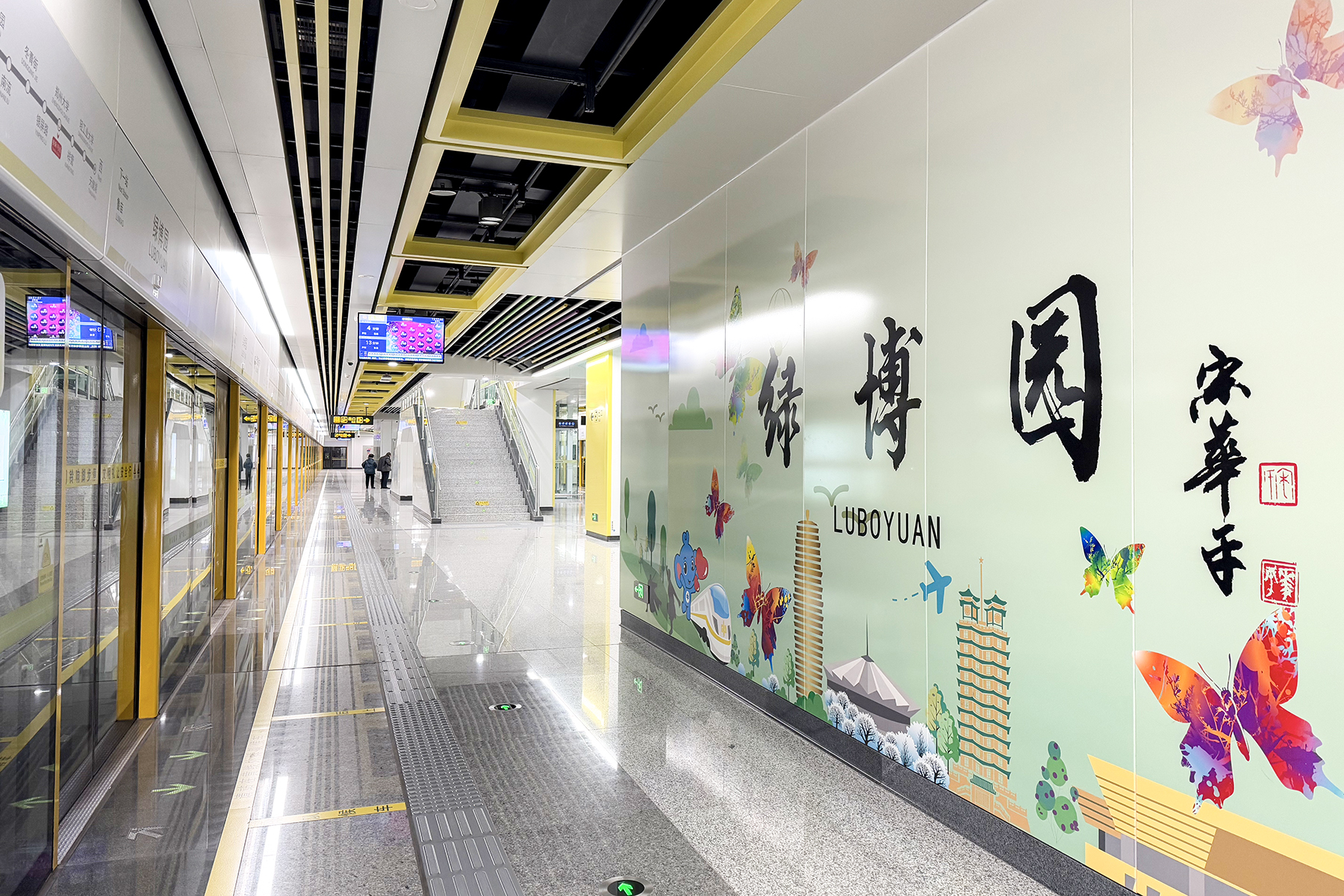
- Platform

General information
- Location: Zhengzhou–Kaifeng Logistics Corridor; Zhongmu County, Zhengzhou, Henan; China
- Coordinates: 34°45′44″N 113°55′29″E
- System: Zhengzhou Metro station
- Operator: Zhengzhou Metro
- Line: Line 8
- Platforms: 2 (1 island platform)
- Tracks: 2

Construction
- Structure type: Underground
- Platform levels: 1
- Accessible: Yes

History
- Opened: 29 December 2024

Services
Preceding station	Zhengzhou Metro	Following station
Longwangmiao towards Tianjianhu	Line 8	Lumiao Terminus
Location

Lubuyuan (simplified Chinese: 绿博园; traditional Chinese: 綠博園; lit. 'Green Expo Park') is a station on Line 8 of the Zhengzhou Metro. The station is located at Zhengzhou–Kaifeng Logistics Corridor in the Zhongmu County, between Longwangmiao and Lumiao. This station opened with the rest of Line 8 on 29 December 2024.

== Description ==
The station is located underground beneath of Zhengzhou–Kaifeng Logistics Corridor, in the Zhongmu County of Zhengzhou. An underground station, the station consists of two floors. From street level, passengers descend a concourse level with fare gates, ticket machines, and a customer service center. The platforms are located one level beneath the concourse level.

Like all stations on Line 8, the station is fully accessible, with three elevators. Two elevators connect the street level to the concourse level at Exits A and D, on the south and north side of Zhengzhou–Kaifeng Logistics Corridor respectively. A third elevator connects the concourse to the platform within the fare-paid zone.

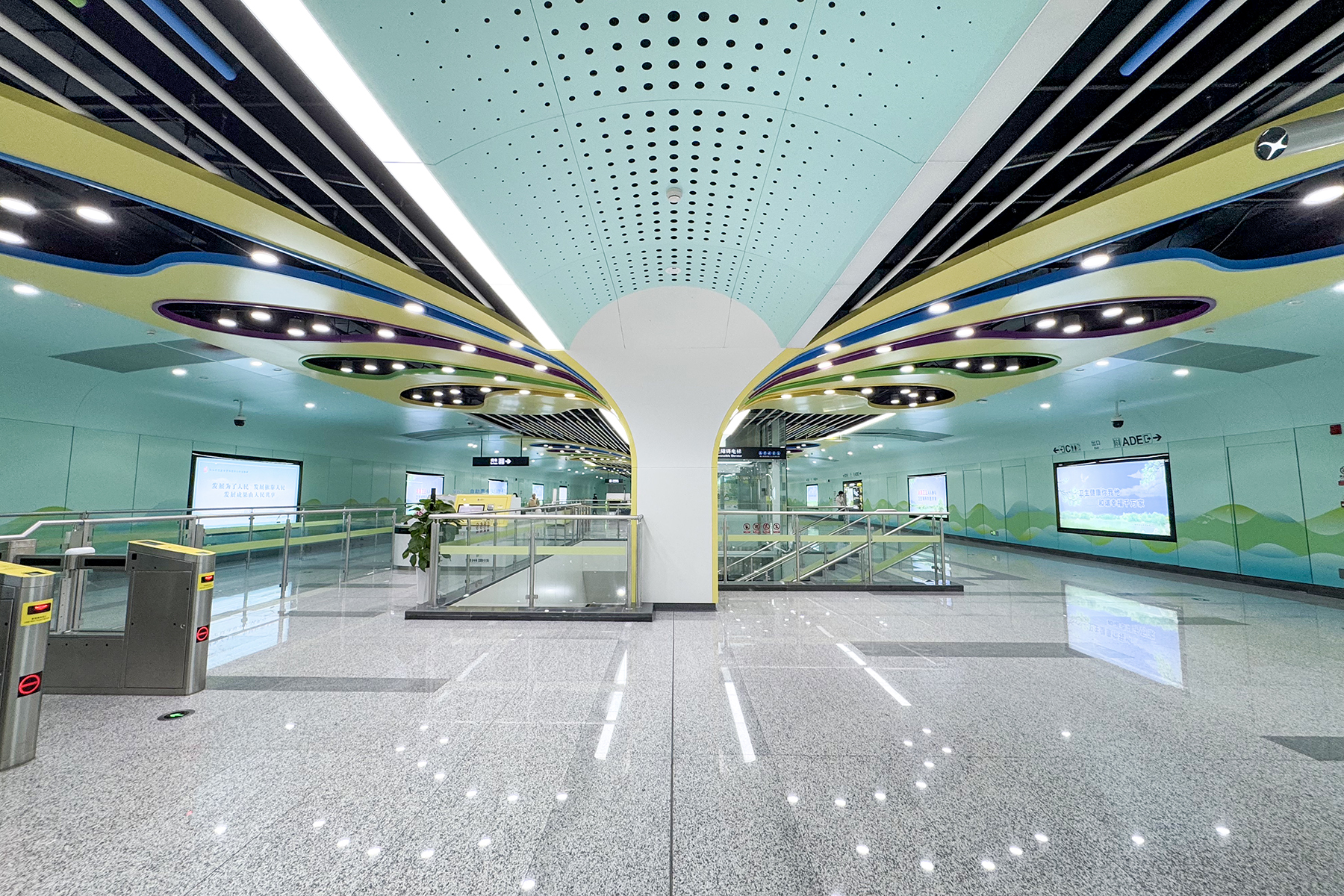
Concourse

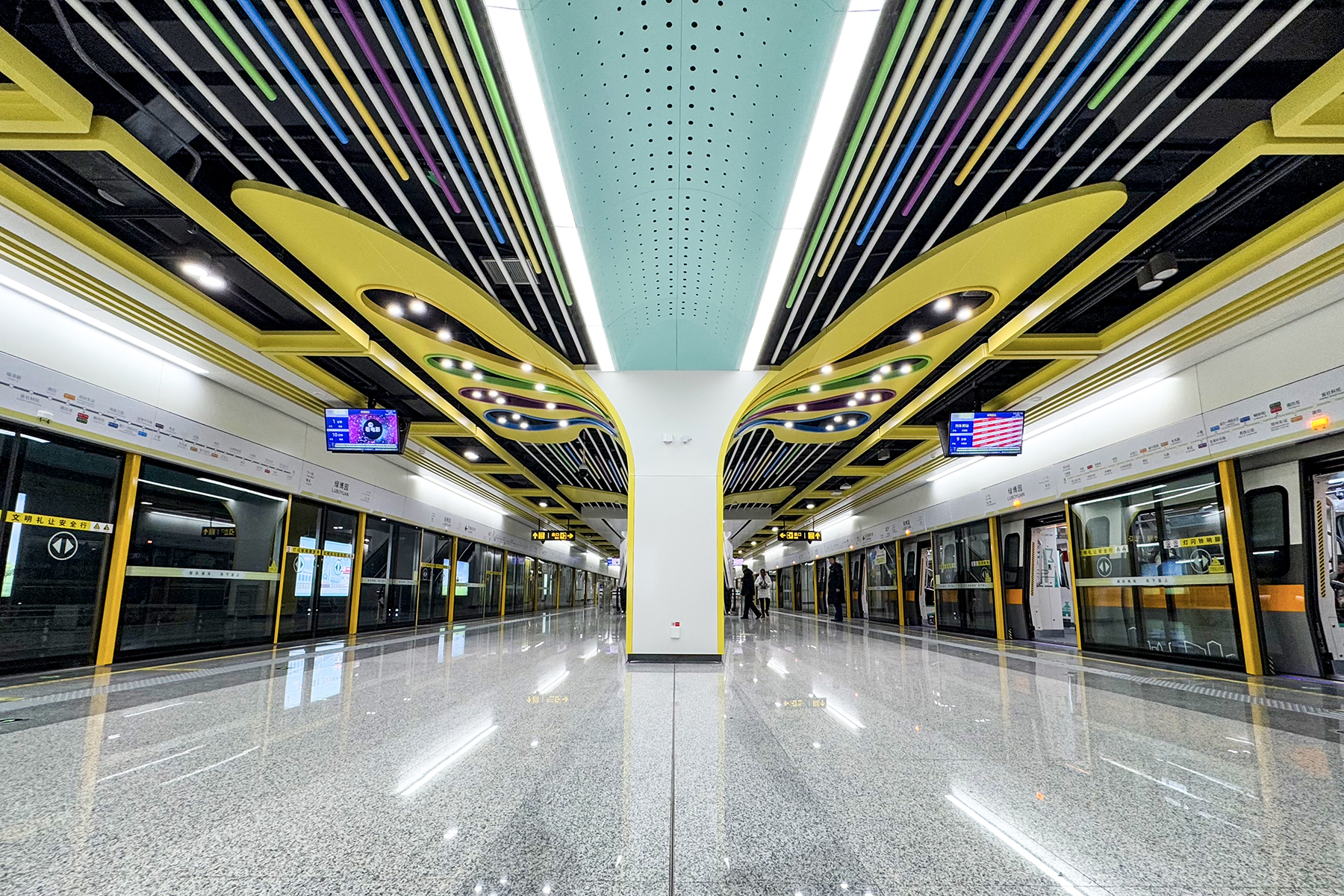
Platforms

=== Entrances/exits ===
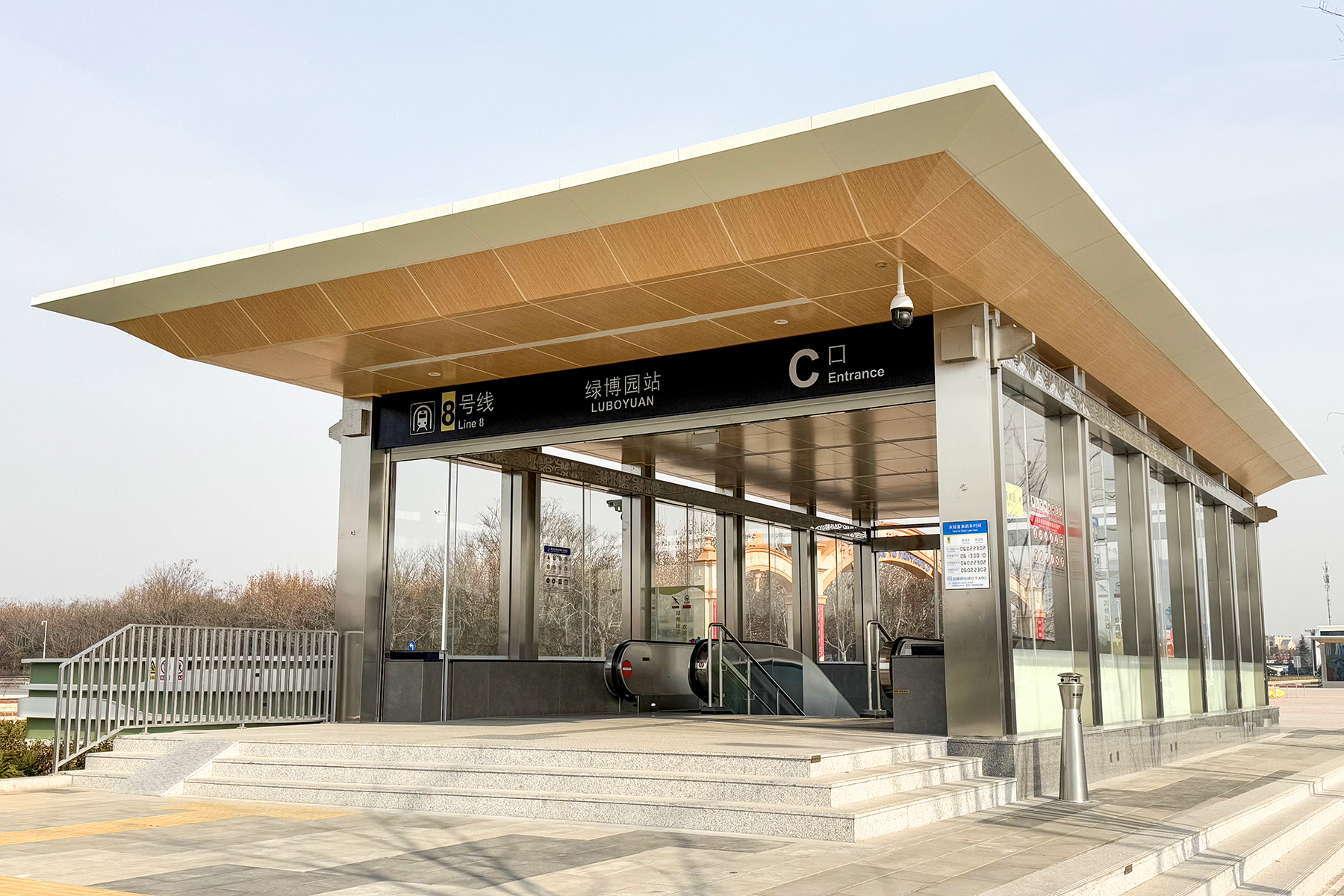
Entrance C

- A: Green Expo Park, Zhengzhou
- C: Zhengzhou Fantawild Resort
- D: Zhengzhou Fantawild Resort
- E1: Green Expo Park, Zhengzhou
