= Yaozhai station =

Metro station in Zhengzhou, China

Yaozhai 姚砦
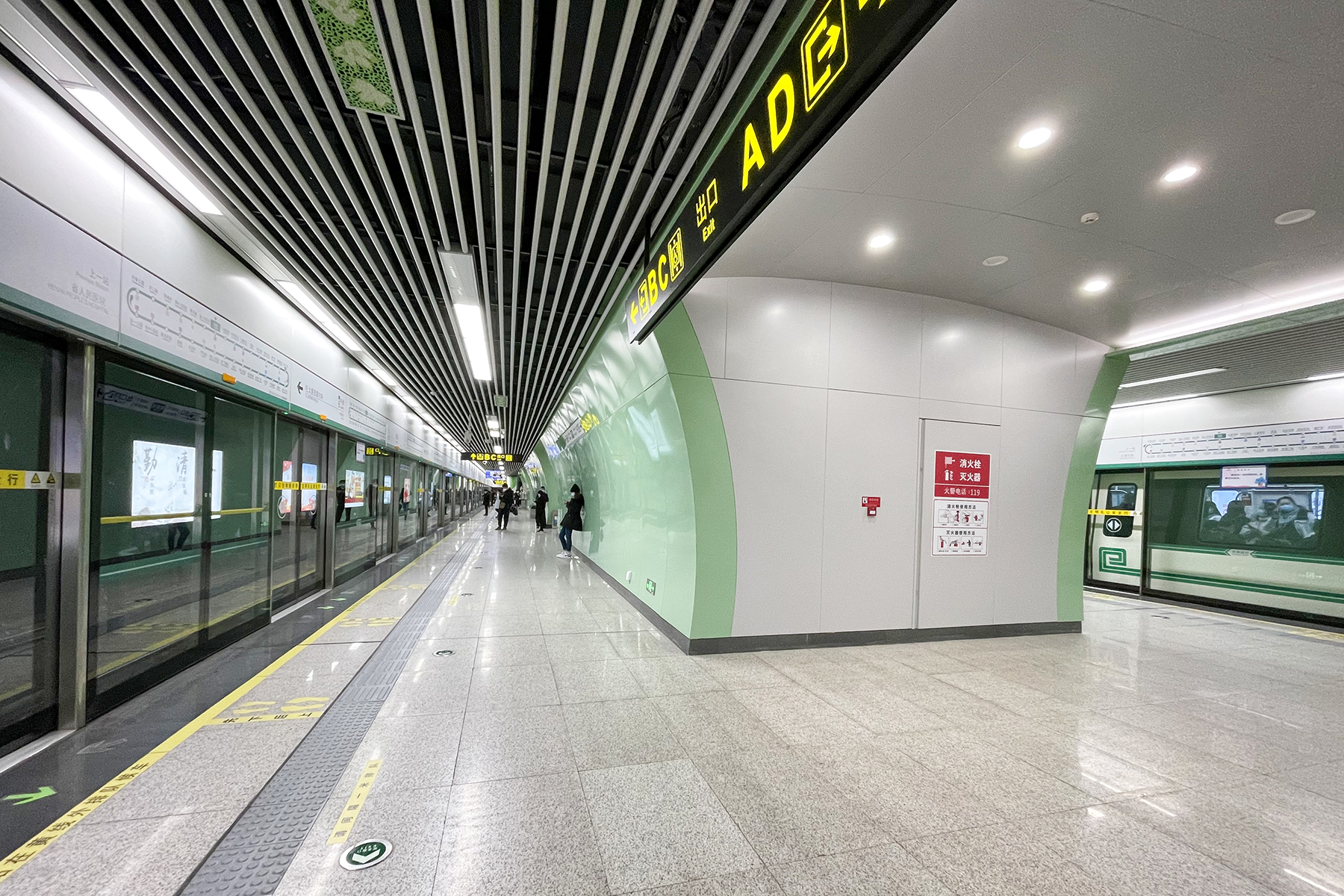
- Platforms of Line 5

General information
- Location: To the south of the interchange between Zhongzhou Avenue and Huanghe Road; Jinshui, Zhengzhou; China
- Coordinates: 34.7758°N 113.7022°E
- System: Zhengzhou Metro rapid transit station
- Operator: Zhengzhou Metro
- Lines: Line 5; Line 6
- Platforms: 2 (1 island platform)
- Connections: Bus

Construction
- Structure type: Underground

Other information
- Status: Operational
- Station code: 507

History
- Opened: 20 May 2019

Services
Preceding station	Zhengzhou Metro	Following station
Zhongyixilu inner loop	Line 5	Henan People's Hospital outer loop
Yanzhuang towards Jiayu	Line 6	Jinhuiqiao towards Qinghua Fuzhong
Location
- Location within Zhengzhou

Yaozhai (Chinese: 姚砦) is a metro station of Zhengzhou Metro Line 5 and Line 6.

== History ==
The station was opened on 20 May 2019.

== Station layout ==
The station has two levels underground, The B1 level is for the concourse and the B2 level is for the single island platform of Line 5. The station has two separated concourses.

G	-	Exits
B1	Concourse	Customer Service, vending machines
B2; Platforms		← Line 5 outer loop (Henan People's Hospital)
B2; Platforms	Island platform, doors will open on the left
B2; Platforms		Line 5 inner loop (Zhongyixilu) →

== Exits ==
The station currently has 5 exits.

Exit	Sign	Destinations	Bus connections
A1	Zhongzhou Dadao (W)	Zhongzhou International Hotel	
A2	Weilai Lu (E)	Zhongzhou International Hotel	206, B15, B18, B1, B25, B6, 65, 265; Night service: Y1
B	Huanghe Lu (S)	Yaozhai Community, Tianyi Building	23, S128, 48; Night service: Y2
C	Huanghe Lu (N)	Jincheng Time Square	23, S128; Night service: Y23
D	Zhongzhou Dadao (W)	Niezhuang Community	188, 312, 47, 75
