= Zhongyixilu station =

Metro station in Zhengzhou, China

Zhongyixilu 众意西路
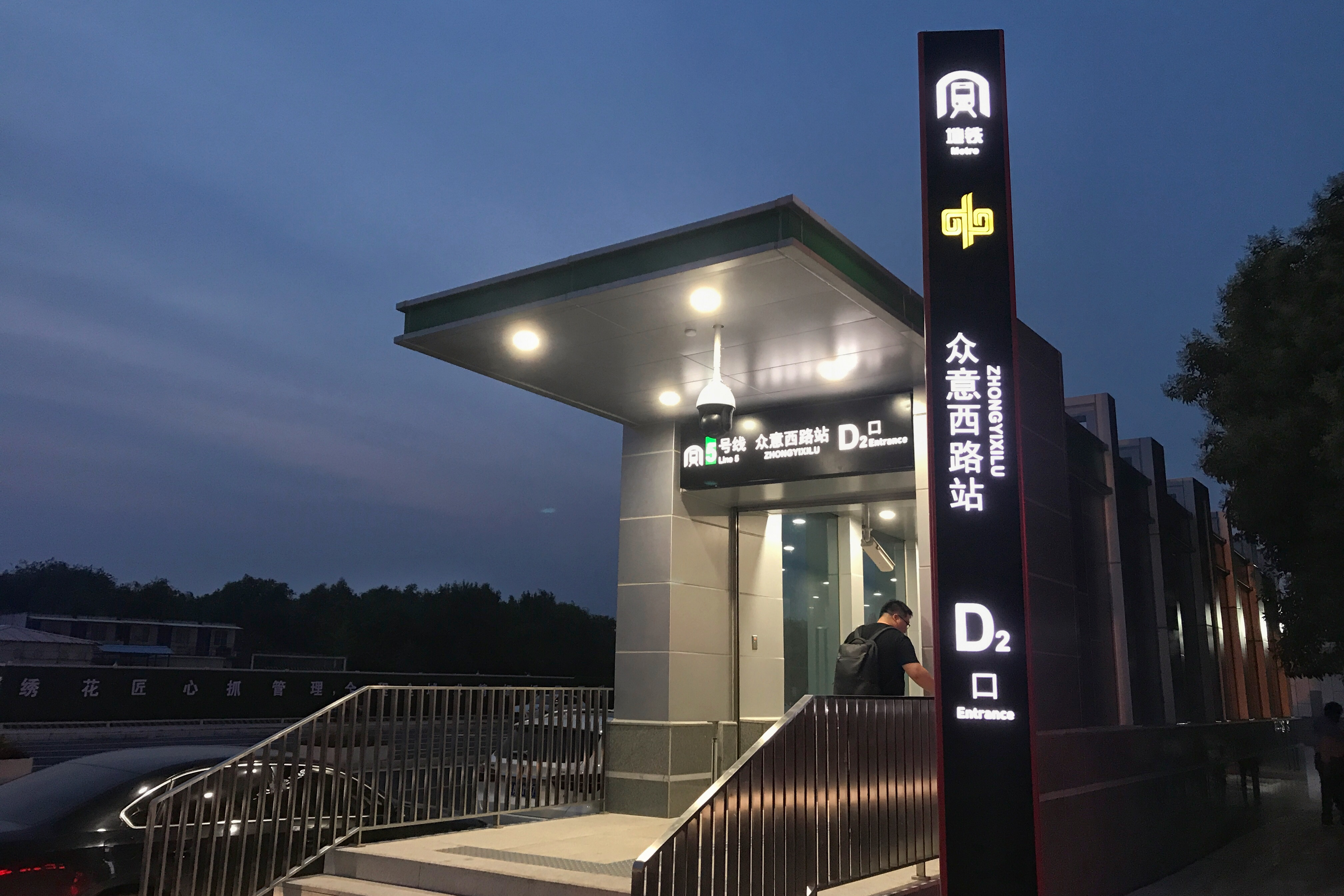

General information
- Location: Shangwu Outer Ring Road × Zhongyi W. Road; Jinshui, Zhengzhou; China
- Coordinates: 34.7773°N 113.7127°E
- System: Zhengzhou Metro rapid transit station
- Operator: Zhengzhou Metro
- Line: Line 5
- Platforms: 2 (1 island platform)
- Connections: Bus

Construction
- Structure type: Underground

Other information
- Status: Operational
- Station code: 508

History
- Opened: 20 May 2019

Services
Preceding station	Zhengzhou Metro	Following station
Central Business District inner loop	Line 5	Yaozhai outer loop
Location
- Location within Zhengzhou

Zhongyixilu (Chinese: 众意西路) is a metro station of Zhengzhou Metro Line 5. The station is located in the western part of Zhengdong New Area CBD.

== History ==
The station was opened on 20 May 2019.

== Station layout ==
The station has two levels underground, The B1 level is for the concourse and the B2 level is for the single island platform of Line 5.

G	-	Exits
B1	Concourse	Customer Service, vending machines
B2; Platforms		← Line 5 outer loop (Yaozhai)
B2; Platforms	Island platform, doors will open on the left
B2; Platforms		Line 5 inner loop (Central Business District) →

== Exits ==
The station currently has 4 exits.

Exit	Sign	Destinations	Bus connections
B	Zhongyixi Lu (W)	Zhengzhou Forest	23, 162, 206, 186, S168; Night services: Y30, Y23
C	Shangwu Waihuan Lu (N)	Car park No. 2 of Zhengzhou New Area CBD	162, 186, S168
D1	Shangwu Waihuan Lu (S)	Dennis Midtown Seven (5-6)	23, 26, 186, S129, 206; Night services: Y23
D2	Shangwu Waihuan Lu (S)	Dennis Midtown Seven (5-6)	23, 26, 186, S129, 206; Night services: Y23
