= Line 5 (Zhengzhou Metro) =

Metro line in Zhengzhou, China

- 5
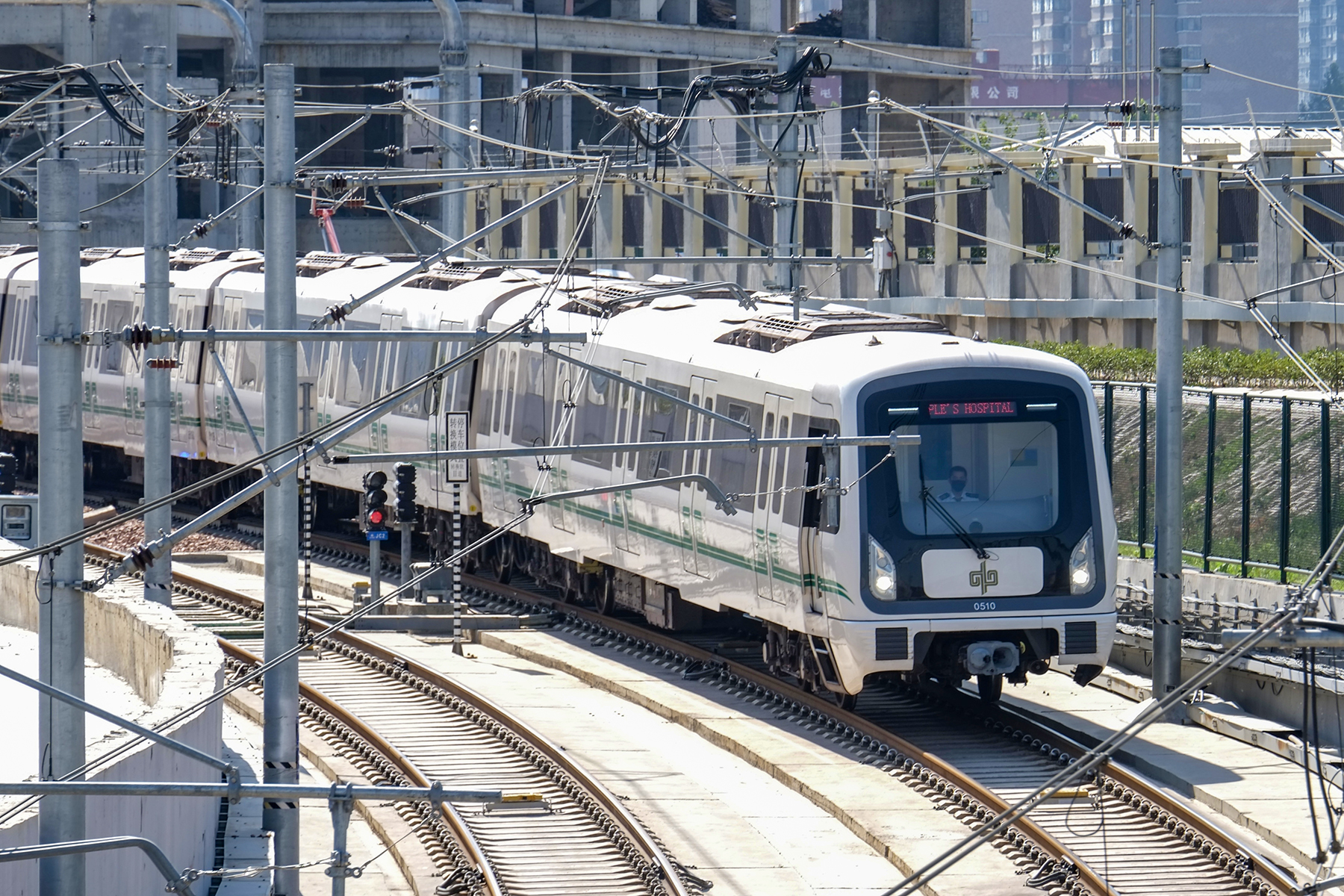
- A train of Zhengzhou Metro Line 5

Overview
- Status: Operational
- Owner: Zhengzhou
- Locale: Zhengzhou, Henan, China
- Stations: 32

Service
- Type: Rapid transit
- System: Zhengzhou Metro
- Operator: Zhengzhou Metro Group Corporation
- Depot(s): Zhongzhou Avenue Depot; Wulongkou Depot

History
- Opened: 20 May 2019; 7 years ago

Technical
- Line length: 40.4 km (25.10 mi)
- Number of tracks: 2
- Character: Underground
- Track gauge: 1,435 mm (4 ft 8 1/2 in)
- Electrification: Overhead lines (1500 volts)

Line 5 of Zhengzhou Metro (Chinese: 郑州地铁5号线; pinyin: zhèngzhōu dìtiě wǔhào xiàn) is a rapid transit line in Zhengzhou that runs in a loop around the city center. It is the only loop-line planned in the Zhengzhou Metro system. The line opened on 20 May 2019.

This line is the first rapid transit line to use the "A size" trains in Zhengzhou. "A size" trains are longer and have larger capacity than "B size" trains, which are used on other operational lines of Zhengzhou Metro.

== History ==
Construction of this line began on 18 December 2014. Trial operations (without passengers) started from 29 December 2018 and formal operations started on 20 May 2019. An infill station, Jingbeierlu station opened on 15 May 2021.

=== Incidents ===
On July 20, 2021, parts of the line were flooded during the 2021 Henan floods. Rainwater filled a subway classification yard, which was located within a goods station (Zhengzhou North railway station) 2.8 km (1.7 mi) away from the distressed site and connected to the mainline between Haitansi station and Shakoulu station with a branch tunnel, and eventually broke the water-resistant retaining wall between the yard and the connection part, flooding into the mainline tunnel and a train was trapped around 18:00. The conductor tried to operate the train back to the previous station but failed due to the activated ATS device. The water level in the car rose from the ankle to the position of chest, and the passengers, including children, elders and pregnant women, stranded in the car were trapped as the symptom of hypoxia and hypothermia began to appear while the flood outside and within preventing them from leaving. One passenger in the fore part of the train, where the water level was lower, broke the window glass to let the oxygen flow inward, by doing which the severe oxygen-lacking situation inside the carriage was relieved shortly before they were rescued. Four hours later, rescuers managed to make a hole on the ceiling of the train and the trapped people, especially those who were in danger, were able to leave the carriage. Then they got out of the tunnel in a row through the emergency evacuating platform alongside the subway rail. Rescuers were able to evacuate 500 people from the train, but 14 were killed. Line 5 reopened on September 15.
Six involved cars (05011A-05016A) were retired from the service, stripped and scrapped. Some of the undamaged parts and equipments were retained and CRRC Zhuzhou Locomotive used them to build cars 05501A-05506A as the replacement.

== Stations ==
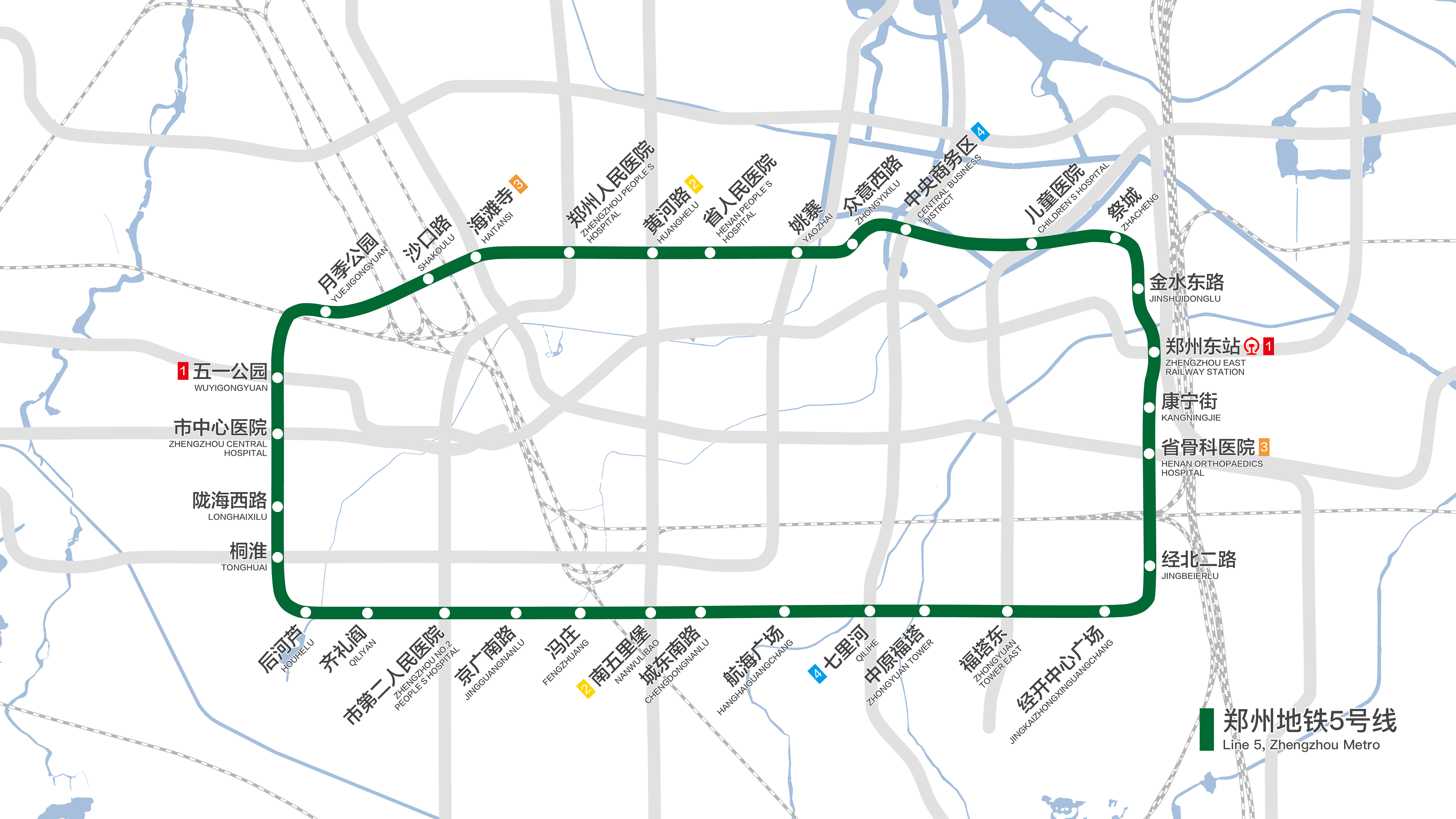
Map of Zhengzhou Metro Line 5

Station №	Station name		Connections	Distance km	Location
Station №	English	Chinese	Connections	Distance km	Location
	— ↑ Loop line - towards Wuyigongyuan ↑ —				
0501	Yueji Gongyuan	月季公园			Zhongyuan
0502	Shakou Lu	沙口路			Jinshui
0503	Haitansi	海滩寺	3		Jinshui
0504	Zhengzhou People's Hospital	郑州人民医院	7		Jinshui
0505	Huanghelu	黄河路	2		Jinshui
0506	Henan People's Hospital	省人民医院			Jinshui
0507	Yaozhai	姚砦	6		Jinshui
0508	Zhongyixilu	众意西路			Jinshui
0509	Central Business District	中央商务区	4		Jinshui
0510	Children's Hospital	儿童医院	12		Jinshui
0511	Zhacheng	祭城			Jinshui
0512	Jinshuidonglu	金水东路			Jinshui
0513	Zhengzhoudong Railway Station	郑州东站	1 8 ZAF; Zhengzhou BRT Route B5, B6, B7		Jinshui
0514	Kangning Jie	康宁街			Guancheng
0515	Henan Orthopaedics Hospital	省骨科医院	3		Guancheng
0516	Jingbei Erlu	经北二路			Guancheng
0517	Jingkai Zhongxin Guangchang	经开中心广场			Guancheng
0518	Futa Dong	福塔东	12		Guancheng
0519	Zhongyuan Tower	中原福塔			Guancheng
0520	Qilihe	七里河	4		Guancheng
0521	Hanghai Guangchang	航海广场			Guancheng
0522	Chengdongnanlu	城东南路			Guancheng
0523	Nanwulibao	南五里堡	2		Guancheng
0524	Fengzhuang	冯庄			Erqi
0525	Jingguang Nanlu	京广南路			Erqi
0526	ZHENGZHOU No.2 People's Hospital	市第二人民医院	7		Erqi
0527	Qiliyan	齐礼阎			Erqi
0528	Houhelu	后河芦			Zhongyuan
0529	Tonghuai	桐淮	6		Zhongyuan
0530	Longhai Xilu	陇海西路	Zhengzhou BRT Route B5		Zhongyuan
0531	Zhengzhou Central Hospital	市中心医院	10		Zhongyuan
0532	Wuyigongyuan	五一公园	1		Zhongyuan
	— ↓ Loop line - towards Yuejigongyuan ↓ —				
