= Line 8 (Zhengzhou Metro) =

Metro line in Zhengzhou, China

- 8
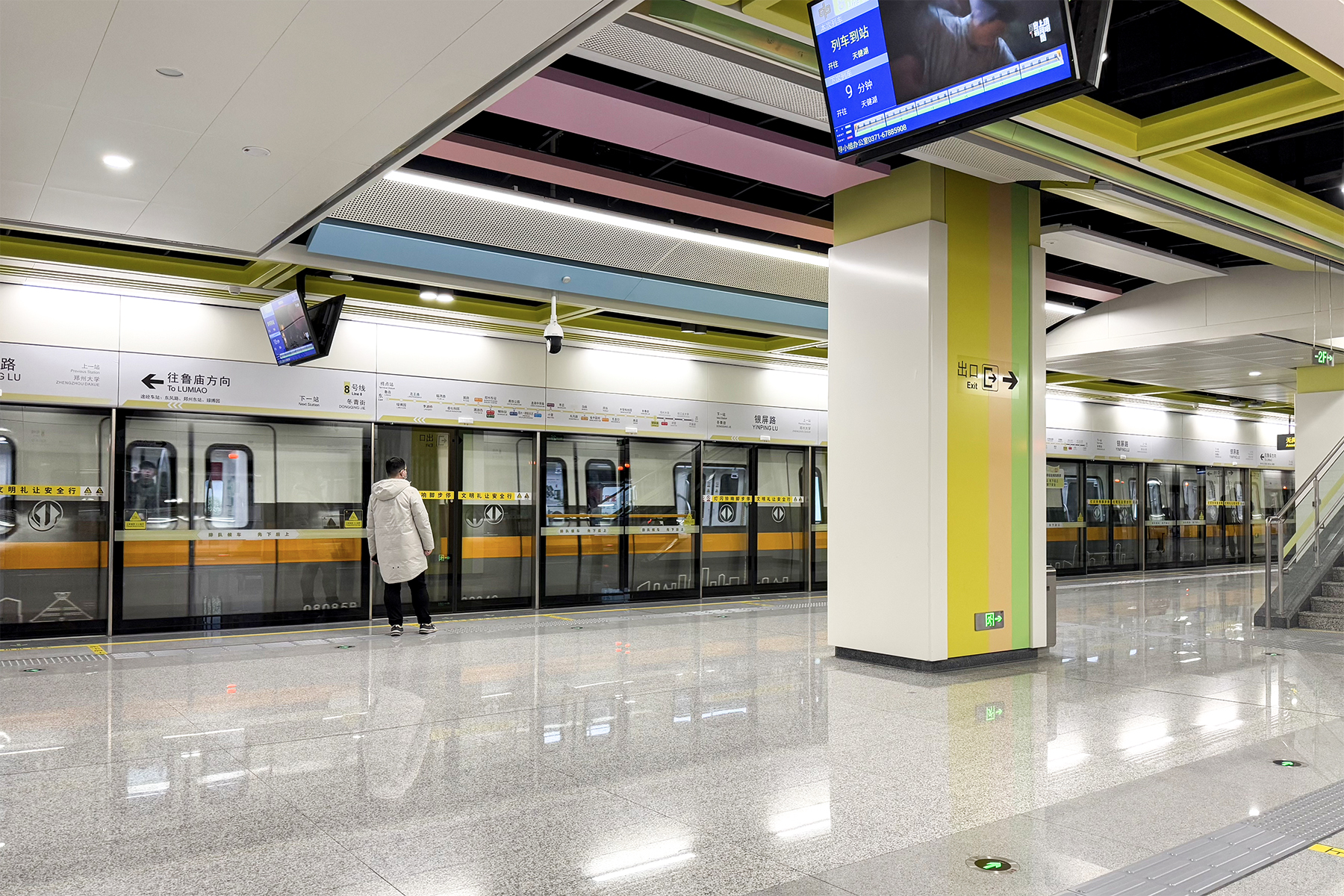
- A train at Yinping Lu station

Overview
- Status: In operation
- Owner: Zhengzhou
- Locale: Zhengzhou, Henan, China
- Termini: Tianjianhu; Lumiao
- Stations: 28 (Phase 1)

Service
- Type: Rapid transit
- System: Zhengzhou Metro
- Operator: Zhengzhou Metro Group Corporation

History
- Opened: 29 December 2024; 17 months ago

Technical
- Line length: 51.78 km (32.17 mi)
- Number of tracks: 2
- Character: Underground
- Track gauge: 1,435 mm (4 ft 8 1/2 in)
- Electrification: Overhead lines (1500 volts)

Line 8 of Zhengzhou Metro (Chinese: 郑州地铁8号线; pinyin: Zhèngzhōu Dìtiě Bāhào Xiàn) is a rapid transit line in Zhengzhou that runs in an east - west direction. The line uses four and six car (six car only in the future) Type A trains. The line was opened on 29 December 2024.

== Stations ==
Station No.	Station name		Connections	Distance km	Location
Station No.	English	Chinese	Connections	Distance km	Location
0801	Tianjianhu	天健湖			Zhongyuan (Zhengzhou National High and New Technology Industries Development Zone)
0802	Qinggongye Daxue	轻工业大学			Zhongyuan (Zhengzhou National High and New Technology Industries Development Zone)
0803	Xiangying	祥营			Zhongyuan (Zhengzhou National High and New Technology Industries Development Zone)
0804	Zhengzhou University	郑州大学	1		Zhongyuan (Zhengzhou National High and New Technology Industries Development Zone)
0805	Yinping Lu	银屏路			Zhongyuan (Zhengzhou National High and New Technology Industries Development Zone)
0806	Dongqing Jie	冬青街			Zhongyuan (Zhengzhou National High and New Technology Industries Development Zone)
0807	Nanliu	南流			Zhongyuan (Zhengzhou National High and New Technology Industries Development Zone)
0808	Daxue Kejiyuan	大学科技园			Zhongyuan (Zhengzhou National High and New Technology Industries Development Zone)
0809	Wulongkou	五龙口			Zhongyuan (Zhengzhou National High and New Technology Industries Development Zone)
0810	Tongle	同乐	3		Jinshui
0811	Sheng Zhongyiyuan	省中医院			Jinshui
0812	Baimiao	白庙	7		Jinshui
0813	Dongfeng Lu	东风路	2		Jinshui
0814	Zaozhuang	枣庄			Jinshui
0815	Xiaoying	小营	6		Jinshui
0816	Longhu Zhonghuan Nan	龙湖中环南	4		Jinshui
0817	Zhengda Yifuyuan Dongqu	郑大一附院东区			Jinshui
0818	Gaotie Gongyuan	高铁公园	12		Jinshui
0819	Changhe Jie	畅和街			Jinshui
0820	Zhengzhoudong Railway Station	郑州东站	1 5 ZAF; Zhengzhou BRT Route B5, B6, B7		Jinshui
0821	Putian Xi	圃田西	3		Guancheng
0822	Putian	圃田			Guancheng
0823	Sheng Shekeyuan	省社科院			Zhongmu
0824	Fuze Lu	福泽路			Zhongmu
0825	Lihuqiao	李湖桥			Zhongmu
0826	Longwangmiao	龙王庙			Zhongmu
0827	Luboyuan	绿博园			Zhongmu
0828	Lumiao	鲁庙			Zhongmu
