= Chengjiao line =

Line of the Zhengzhou Metro

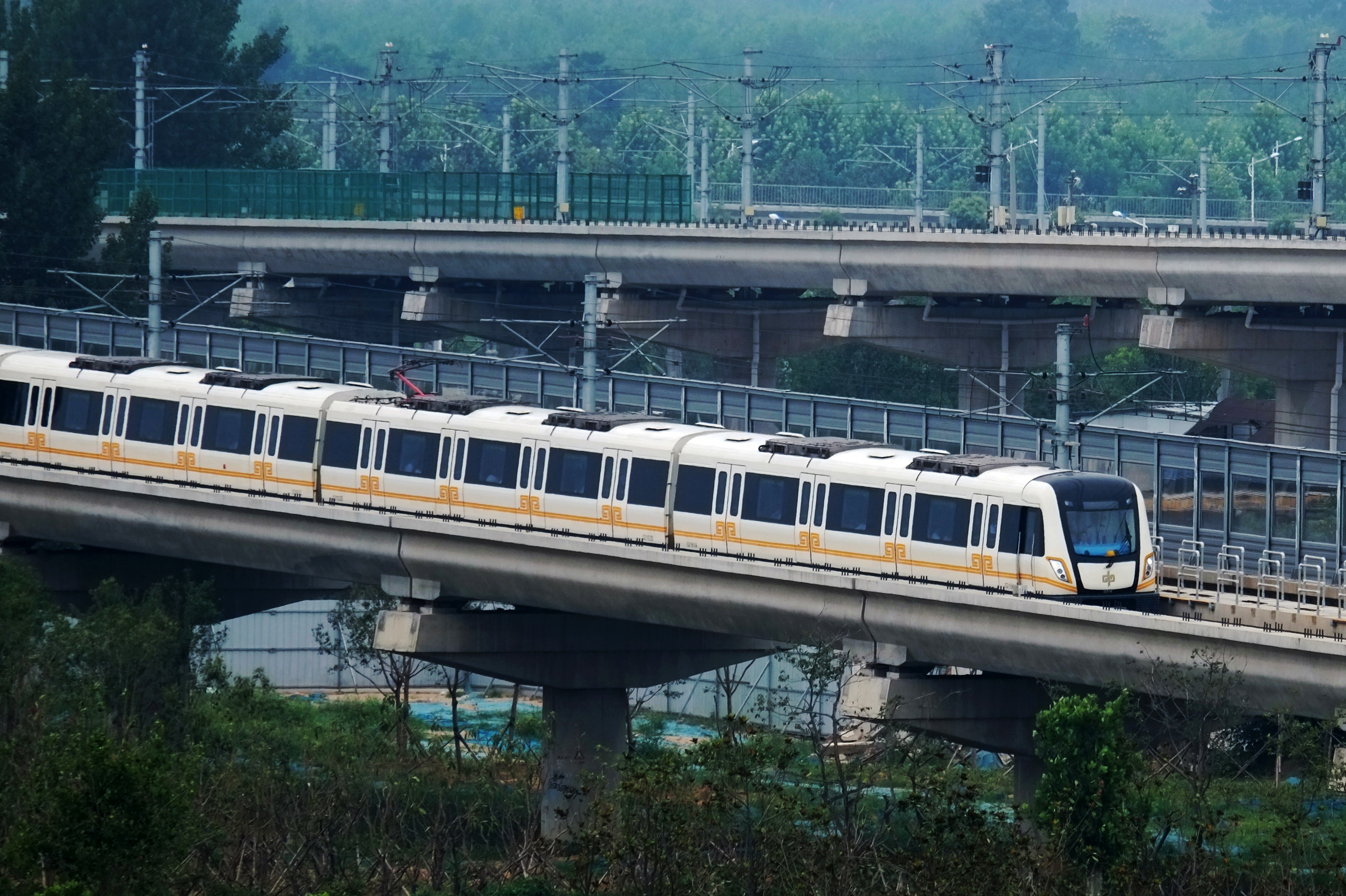
- A train of Zhengzhou Metro running on Chengjiao line

Overview
- Other name(s): Line 9 Suburban line
- Status: Operational
- Locale: Zhengzhou, Henan, China
- Termini: Nansihuan (through service Jiahe); Zhengzhou Hangkonggang Railway Station
- Stations: 19 (18 in operation)

Service
- Type: Rapid transit, Airport rail link
- System: Zhengzhou Metro
- Operator: Zhengzhou Metro Group Corporation
- Depot: Mengzhuang Depot

History
- Opened: 12 January 2017; 9 years ago

Technical
- Line length: 40.84 km (25.38 mi)
- Number of tracks: 2
- Character: Underground and elevated
- Track gauge: 1,435 mm (4 ft 8 1/2 in)

The Chengjiao line of the Zhengzhou Metro (Chinese: 郑州地铁城郊线; pinyin: Zhèngzhōu Dìtiě Chéngjiāo Xiàn), planned to be part of Line 9 in the future, is a rapid transit line in Zhengzhou. It was opened on 12 January 2017. This line is 40.84 km (25.38 mi) long with 19 stations (16 stations in operation).

Through services are operated on Line 2 and Chengjiao line, although they are classified as separate lines.

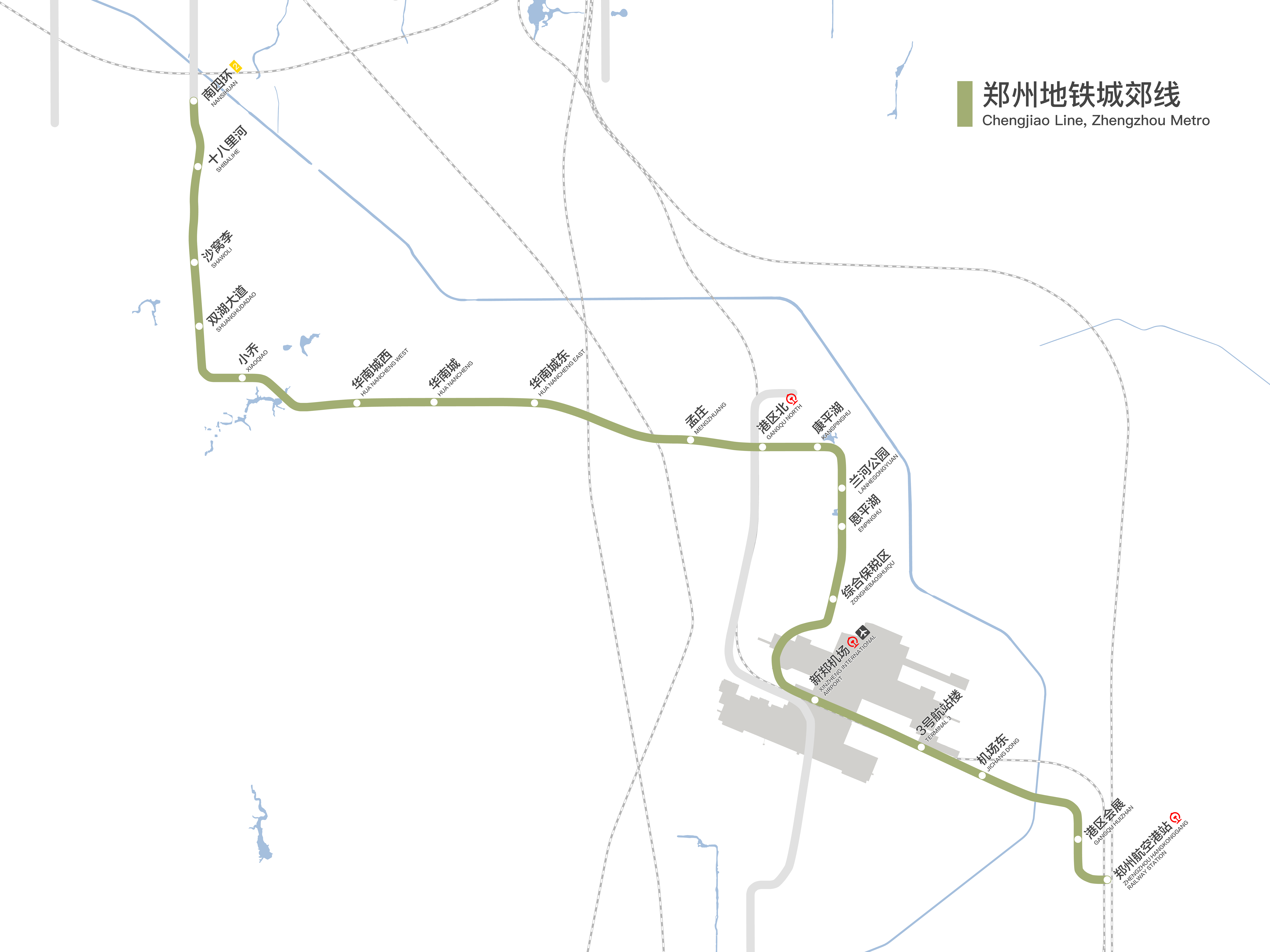
Map of Zhengzhou Metro Chengjiao Line

== Opening timeline ==
Segment	Commencement	Length	Station(s)	Name
Nansihuan — Xinzheng International Airport	12 January 2017	31.7 km (19.70 mi)	11	Phase 1
Kangpinghu	16 November 2017	Infill station	1	
Gangqu North	12 December 2020	Infill station	1	
Xinzheng International Airport — Zhengzhou Hangkonggang Railway Station	20 June 2022	8.98 km (5.58 mi)	3	Phase 2
Xiaoqiao & Hua'nancheng Dong	22 September 2023	Infill stations	2	

== Stations ==
Line name	Service Route		Station №	Station name		Connections	Location
Line name	Local	Rapid	Station №	English	Chinese	Connections	Location
Line 2	●	●	0215	Jiahe	贾河		Huiji
Line 2	●	●	0216	Huijiquzhengfu	惠济区政府		Huiji
Line 2	●	●	0217	Maozhuang	毛庄		Huiji
Line 2	●	●	0218	Huangheyingbinguan	黄河迎宾馆	7	Huiji
Line 2	●	●	0219	Jinwa	金洼		Huiji
Line 2	●	●	0220	Jindalu	金达路		Huiji
Line 2	●	●	0221	Liuzhuang	刘庄		Jinshui
Line 2	●	●	0222	Liulin	柳林		Jinshui
Line 2	●	●	0223	Shamen	沙门	4	Jinshui
Line 2	●	●	0224	Beisanhuan	北三环	Zhengzhou BRT Route B3, B6	Jinshui
Line 2	●	●	0225	Dongfenglu	东风路	8	Jinshui
Line 2	●	●	0226	Guanhutun	关虎屯	Zhengzhou BRT Route B2	Jinshui
Line 2	●	●	0227	Huanghelu	黄河路	5	Jinshui
Line 2	●	●	0228	Zijingshan	紫荆山	1	Jinshui
Line 2	●	●	0229	Dongdajie	东大街	3	Guancheng
Line 2	●	●	0230	Longhaidonglu	陇海东路	Zhengzhou BRT Route B5	Guancheng
Line 2	●	●	0231	Erligang	二里岗	6	Guancheng
Line 2	●	●	0232	Nanwulibao	南五里堡	5	Guancheng
Line 2	●	●	0233	Huazhai	花寨		Guancheng
Line 2	●	●	0234	Nansanhuan	南三环		Guancheng
Line 2	●	●	0235	Zhanmatun	站马屯		Guancheng
Line 2	●	●	0236/0936	Nansihuan	南四环		Guancheng
Chengjiao line	●	｜	0937	Shibalihe	十八里河		Guancheng
Chengjiao line	●	｜	0938	Shawoli	沙窝李		Xinzheng
Chengjiao line	●	●	0939	Shuanghudadao	双湖大道		Xinzheng
Chengjiao line	●	｜	0940	Xiaoqiao	小乔		Xinzheng
Chengjiao line	●	｜	0941	Hua'nancheng West	华南城西		Xinzheng
Chengjiao line	●	｜	0942	Hua'nancheng	华南城		Xinzheng
Chengjiao line	●	｜	0943	Hua'nancheng Dong	华南城东		Xinzheng
Chengjiao line	●	｜	0944	Mengzhuang	孟庄		Xinzheng
Chengjiao line	●	●	0945	Gangqu Bei	港区北	ZXA Mengzhuang railway station Zhengxu	Xinzheng
Chengjiao line	●	｜	0946	Kangpinghu	康平湖		Xinzheng / Zhongmu Co.
Chengjiao line	●	｜	0947	Lanhegongyuan	兰河公园		Xinzheng
Chengjiao line	●	｜	0948	Enpinghu	恩平湖		Zhongmu Co.
Chengjiao line	●	｜	0949	Zonghebaoshuiqu	综合保税区		Zhongmu Co.
Chengjiao line	●	●	0950	Xinzheng International Airport	新郑机场	ZXA EZF; CGO; Zhengxu	Xinzheng
Chengjiao line	｜	｜	0951	Terminal 3	3号航站楼		Xinzheng
Chengjiao line	●	｜	0952	Jichang Dong	机场东		Zhongmu Co.
Chengjiao line	●	｜	0953	Gangqu Huizhan	港区会展		Zhongmu Co.
Chengjiao line	●	●	0954	Zhengzhou Hangkonggang Railway Station	郑州航空港站	ZXA ZIF	Zhongmu Co.
