= Hua'nancheng West station =

Metro station in Zhengzhou, China

Hua'nancheng West 华南城西
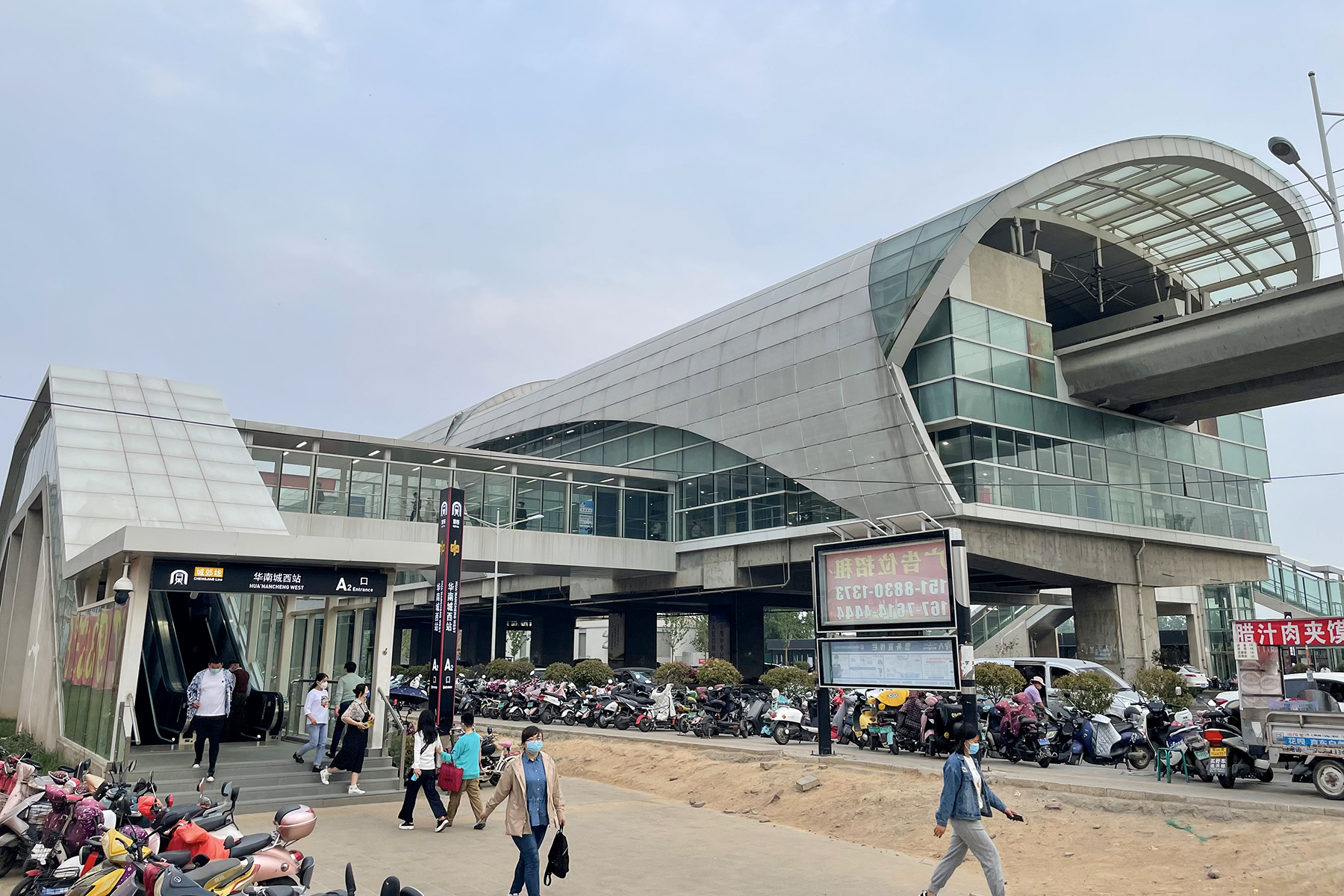

General information
- Location: Hua'nancheng Avenue; Xinzheng, Zhengzhou; China
- Coordinates: 34.5952°N 113.7192°E
- System: Zhengzhou Metro rapid transit station
- Operator: Zhengzhou Metro
- Line: Chengjiao line
- Platforms: 2
- Connections: Bus

Construction
- Structure type: Elevated

Other information
- Station code: 241

History
- Opened: 12 January 2017

Services
Preceding station	Zhengzhou Metro	Following station
Shuanghudadao towards Jiahe	Chengjiao line through services via Line 2	Hua'nancheng towards Zhengzhou Hangkonggang Railway Station
Location
- Location within Zhengzhou

Hua'nancheng West (Chinese: 华南城西) is a metro station of Zhengzhou Metro Chengjiao line.

== Station layout ==
The station is an elevated station with 3 levels. The ground level is for the entrances/exits and the 2nd level is for the station concourse and footbridges connecting Exit B. The 2 side platforms for Chengjiao line is on the 3rd level.

3F; Platforms	Side platform, doors will open on the right
3F; Platforms	Platform 2	← Chengjiao line towards Jiahe (Shuanghudadao)
3F; Platforms	Platform 1	Chengjiao line towards Zhengzhou Hangkonggang Railway Station (Hua'nancheng) →
3F; Platforms	Side platform, doors will open on the right
2F	Concourse	Customer service, Vending machines
G		Exits

== Exits ==
Exit	Destination
Exit A1 & A2	Hua'nancheng Avenue (north side)
Exit B1 & B2	Hua'nancheng Avenue (south side)
