= Shuanghudadao station =

Metro station in Zhengzhou, China

Shuanghudadao 双湖大道
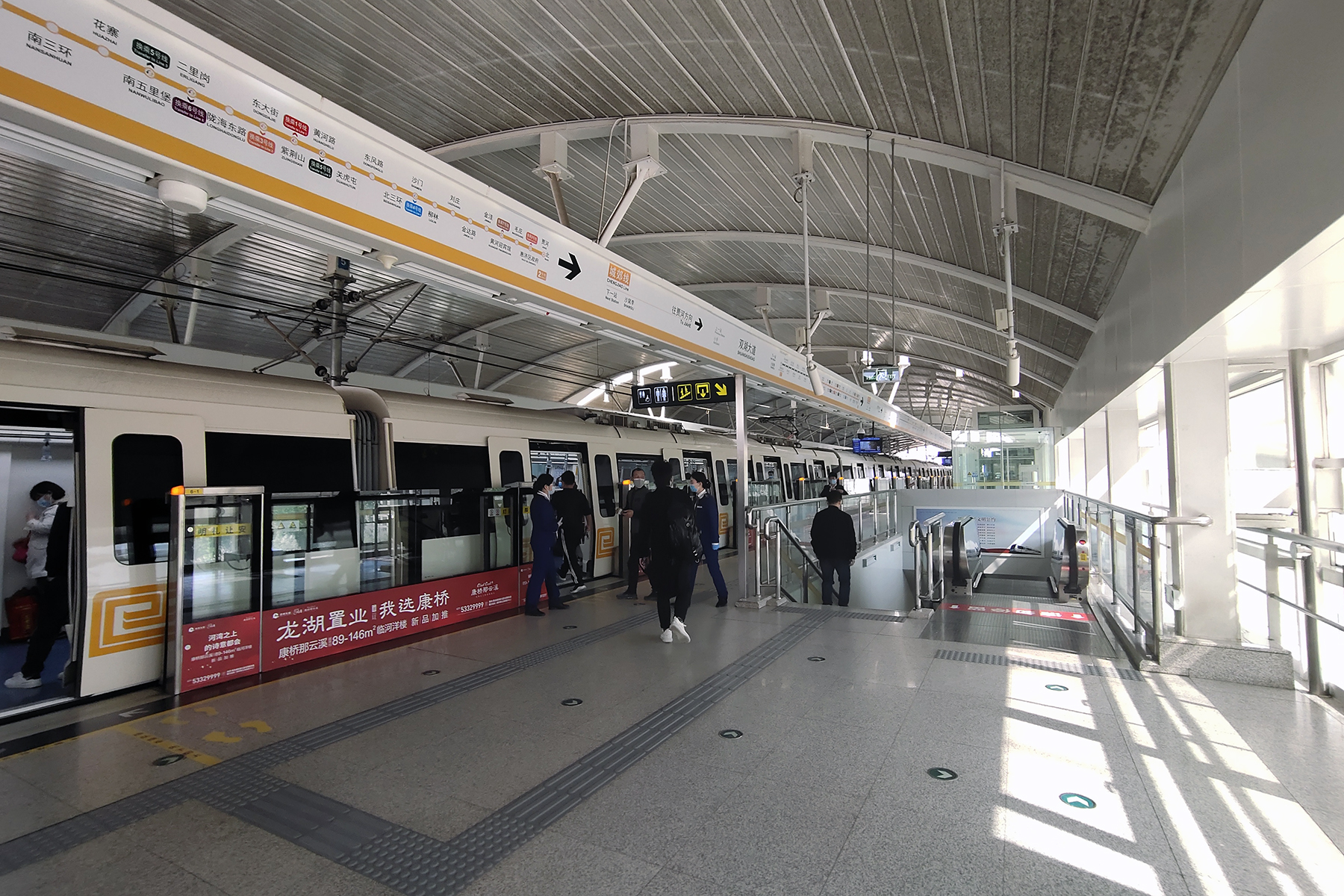

General information
- Location: Longhu Town, Xinzheng, Zhengzhou; China
- Coordinates: 34.6127°N 113.6769°E
- System: Zhengzhou Metro rapid transit station
- Operator: Zhengzhou Metro
- Line: Chengjiao line
- Platforms: 2
- Connections: Bus

Construction
- Structure type: Elevated

Other information
- Station code: 239

History
- Opened: 12 January 2017
- Former names: Houhu

Services
Preceding station	Zhengzhou Metro	Following station
Shawoli towards Jiahe	Chengjiao line through services via Line 2	Hua'nancheng West towards Zhengzhou Hangkonggang Railway Station
Location
- Location within Zhengzhou

Shuanghudadao (Chinese: 双湖大道) is a metro station of Zhengzhou Metro Chengjiao line.

== Station layout ==
The station is an elevated station with 3 levels. The ground level is for the entrances/exits and the 2nd level is for the station concourse and footbridges connecting Exit B. The 2 side platforms for Chengjiao line is on the 3rd level.

3F; Platforms	Side platform, doors will open on the right
3F; Platforms	Platform 2	← Chengjiao line towards Jiahe (Shawoli)
3F; Platforms	Platform 1	Chengjiao line towards Zhengzhou Hangkonggang Railway Station (Hua'nancheng West) →
3F; Platforms	Side platform, doors will open on the right
2F	Concourse	Customer service, Vending machines
G		Exits

== Exits ==
Exit	Destination
Exit A	Longhu Avenue (east side), Shuanghu Avenue (north side)
Exit B1	Longhu Avenue (west side)
Exit B2	Longhu Avenue (west side), Shuanghu Avenue (north side)
