= Enpinghu station =

Metro station in Zhengzhou, China

Enpinghu 恩平湖
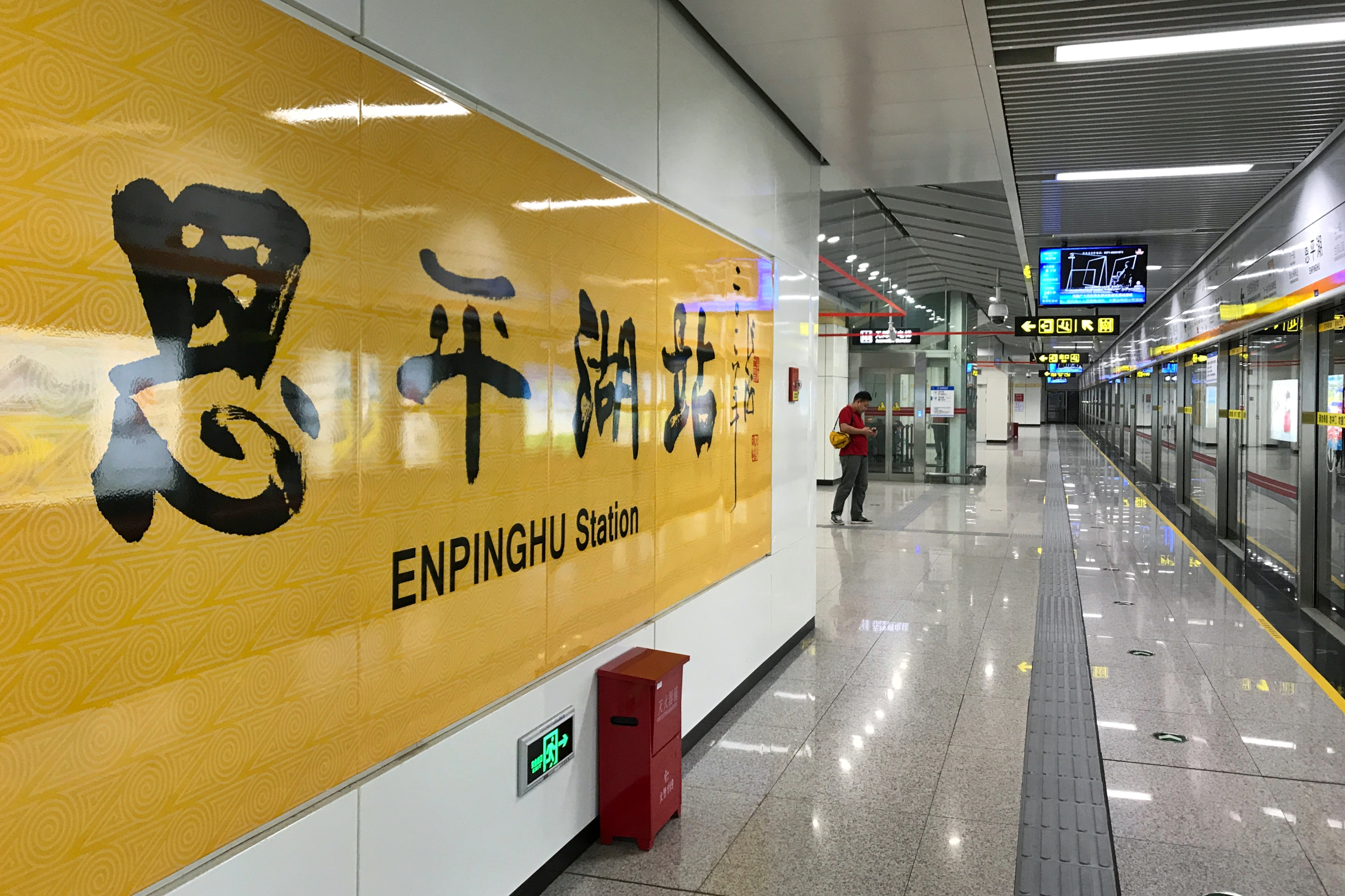

General information
- Location: Yongzhou Road × Poyanghu Road; Zhengzhou Airport Economy Zone, Zhengzhou; China
- Coordinates: 34.5686°N 113.8538°E
- System: Zhengzhou Metro rapid transit station
- Operator: Zhengzhou Metro
- Line: Chengjiao line
- Platforms: 2 (1 island platform)
- Connections: Bus

Construction
- Structure type: Underground

Other information
- Station code: 248

History
- Opened: 12 January 2017

Services
Preceding station	Zhengzhou Metro	Following station
Lanhegongyuan towards Jiahe	Chengjiao line through services via Line 2	Zonghebaoshuiqu towards Zhengzhou Hangkonggang Railway Station
Location
- Location within Zhengzhou

Enpinghu (Chinese: 恩平湖) is a metro station of Zhengzhou Metro Chengjiao line. The station is located beneath the crossing of Yongzhou Road and Poyanghu Road.

== Station layout ==
The 2-level underground station has a single island platform. The station concourse is on the B1 level and the B2 level is for the platforms.

G	-	Exits
B1	Concourse	Customer Service, Vending machines
B2; Platforms	Platform 2	← Chengjiao line towards Jiahe (Lanhegongyuan)
B2; Platforms	Island platform, doors will open on the left
B2; Platforms	Platform 1	Chengjiao line towards Zhengzhou Hangkonggang Railway Station (Zonghebaoshuiqu) →

== Exits ==
Exit	Destination
Exit C	Yongzhou Road (west side)
Exit D	Yongzhou Road (west side), Poyanghu Road (south side)

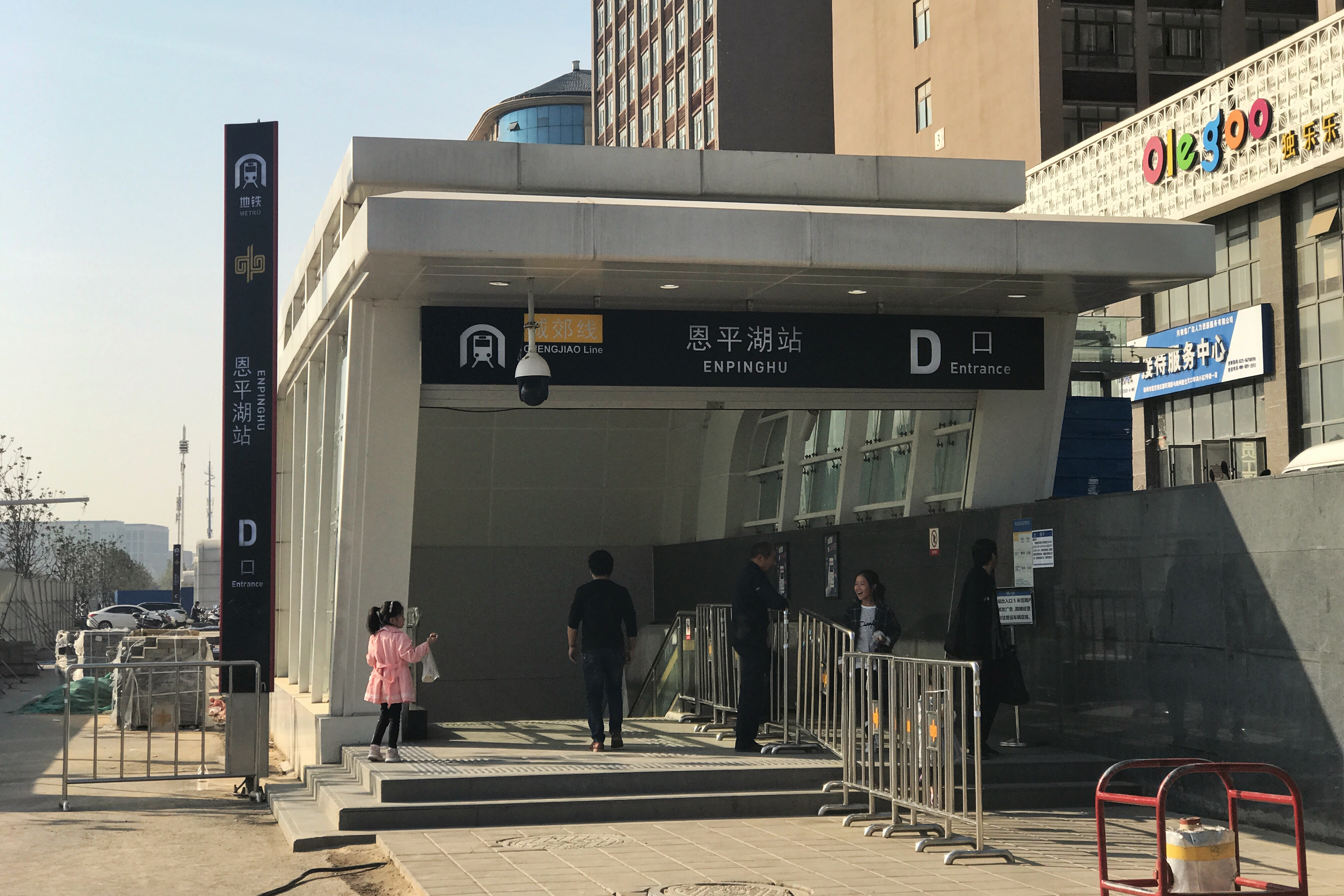
Exit D of the station
