= Kangpinghu station =

Metro station in Zhengzhou, China

Kangpinghu 康平湖
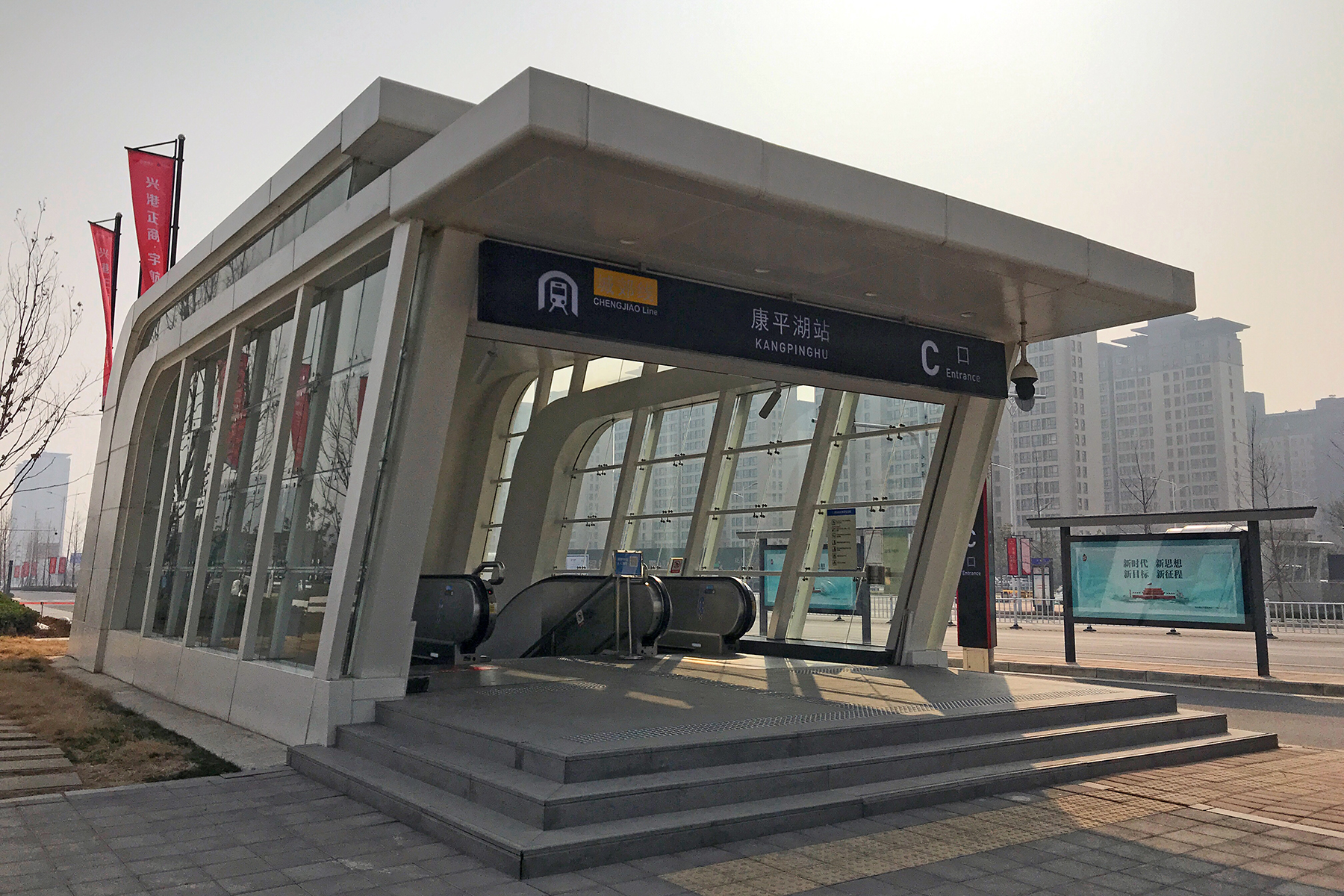

General information
- Location: Yongzhou Road × Dongtinghu Road; Zhengzhou Airport Economy Zone, Zhengzhou; China
- Coordinates: 34.5861°N 113.8472°E
- System: Zhengzhou Metro rapid transit station
- Operator: Zhengzhou Metro
- Line: Chengjiao line
- Platforms: 2 (1 island platform)
- Connections: Bus

Construction
- Structure type: Underground

Other information
- Station code: 246

History
- Opened: 16 November 2017

Services
Preceding station	Zhengzhou Metro	Following station
Gangqu Bei towards Jiahe	Chengjiao line through services via Line 2	Lanhegongyuan towards Zhengzhou Hangkonggang Railway Station
Location
- Location within Zhengzhou

Kangpinghu (Chinese: 康平湖) is a metro station of Zhengzhou Metro Chengjiao line. The station is located beneath the crossing of Taihu Road and Lingfeng Street.

== Station layout ==
The 2-level underground station has a single island platform. The station concourse is on the B1 level and the B2 level is for the platforms.

G	-	Exits
B1	Concourse	Customer service, Vending machines
B2; Platforms	Platform 2	← Chengjiao line towards Jiahe (Mengzhuang)
B2; Platforms	Island platform, doors will open on the left
B2; Platforms	Platform 1	Chengjiao line towards Zhengzhou Hangkonggang Railway Station (Lanhegongyuan) →

== Exits ==
Exit	Destination
Exit A	Lingfeng Street (east side), Taihu Road (south side)
Exit B	Lingfeng Street (west side), Taihu Road (south side)
Exit C	Lingfeng Street (west side), Taihu Road (north side)
Exit D	Lingfeng Street (east side), Taihu Road (north side)
