= Zonghebaoshuiqu station =

Metro station in Zhengzhou, China

Zonghebaoshuiqu 综合保税区
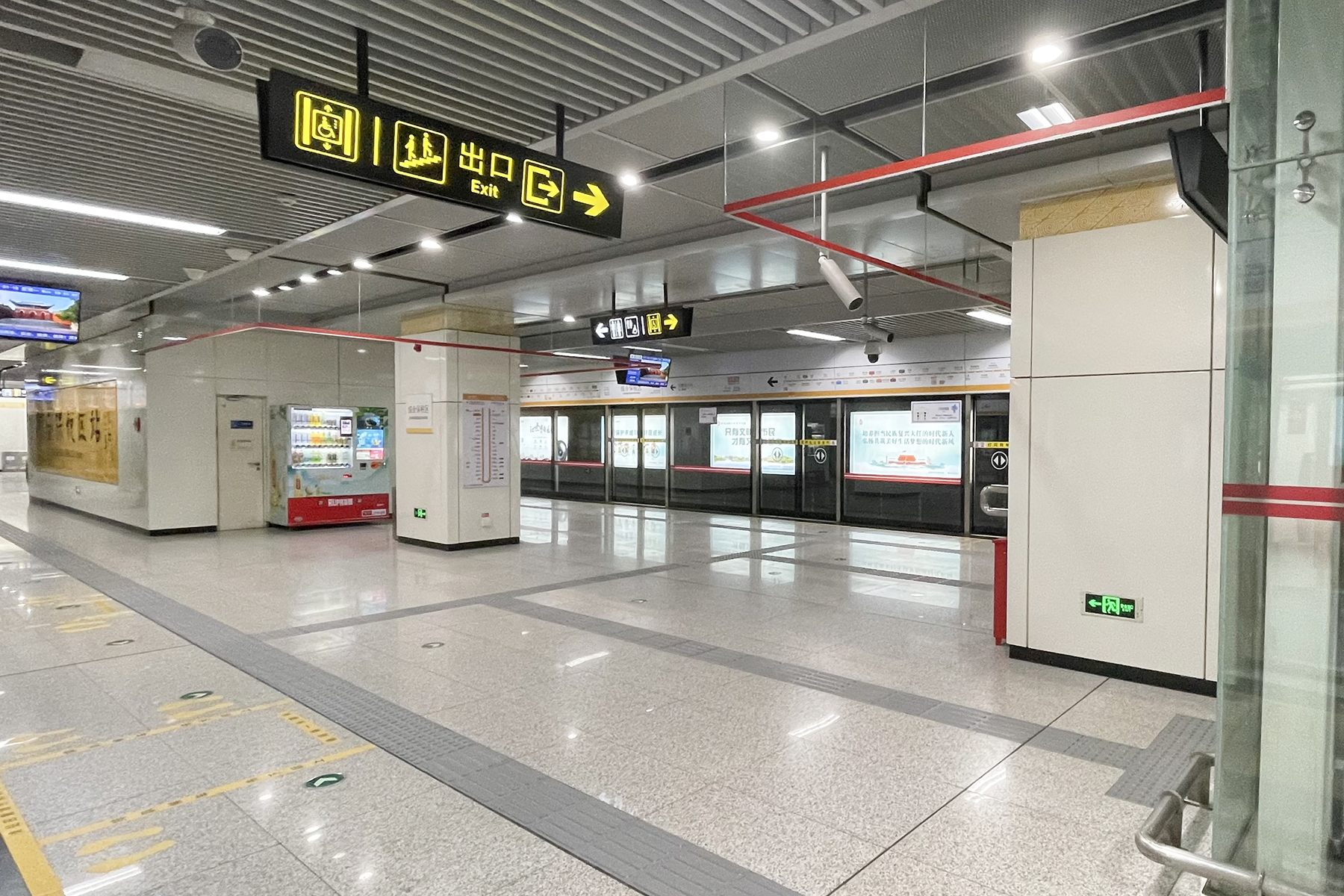

General information
- Location: Yongzhou Road; Zhengzhou Airport Economy Zone, Zhengzhou, Henan; China
- Coordinates: 34.5506°N 113.8513°E
- System: Zhengzhou Metro rapid transit station
- Operator: Zhengzhou Metro
- Line: Chengjiao line
- Platforms: 2 (1 island platform)
- Connections: Bus

Construction
- Structure type: Underground

Other information
- Station code: 249

History
- Opened: 12 January 2017

Services
Preceding station	Zhengzhou Metro	Following station
Enpinghu towards Jiahe	Chengjiao line through services via Line 2	Xinzheng International Airport towards Zhengzhou Hangkonggang Railway Station
Location
- Location within Zhengzhou

Zonghebaoshuiqu (Chinese: 综合保税区; lit. 'Comprehensive Free Trade Zone' is a metro station of Zhengzhou Metro Chengjiao line. The station is close to the Zhengzhou Xinzheng Comprehensive Free Trade Zone.

== Station layout ==
The 2-level underground station has a single island platform. The station concourse is on the B1 level and the B2 level is for the platforms.

Since there is no crossover at Xinzheng International Airport station, trains of Chengjiao line traveling in both directions share the same platform at the station.

G	-	Exits
B1	Concourse	Customer Service, Vending machines
B2; Platforms	Platform 2	← Chengjiao line towards Jiahe (Enpinghu) → Chengjiao line towards Zhengzhou Hangkonggang Railway Station (Xinzheng International Airport)
B2; Platforms	Island platform
B2; Platforms	Platform 1	← Chengjiao line towards Jiahe (Enpinghu) → Chengjiao line towards Zhengzhou Hangkonggang Railway Station (Xinzheng International Airport)

== Exits ==
Exit	Destination
Exit A	Yongzhou Road (east side)
Exit C1	Yongzhou Road (west side)
Exit C2	Yongzhou Road (west side)
