= Nansanhuan station =

Metro station in Zhengzhou, China

Nansanhuan 南三环
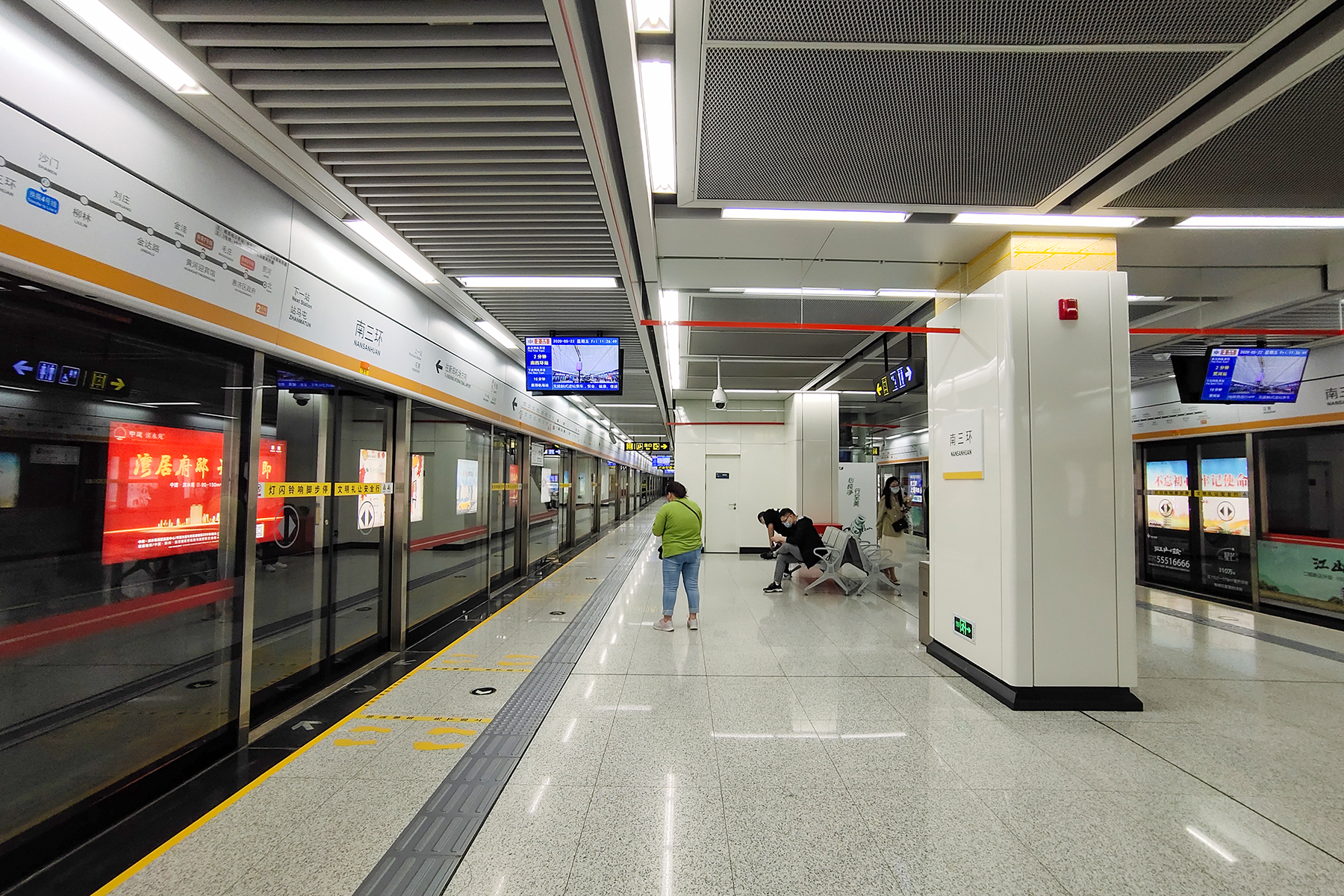

General information
- Location: Zijingshan South Road × South 3rd Ring Road; Guancheng, Zhengzhou; China
- Coordinates: 34.7002°N 113.6762°E
- System: Zhengzhou Metro rapid transit station
- Operator: Zhengzhou Metro
- Line: Line 2
- Platforms: 2 (1 island platform)
- Connections: Bus

Construction
- Structure type: Underground

Other information
- Station code: 234

History
- Opened: 19 August 2016

Services
Preceding station	Zhengzhou Metro	Following station
Huazhai towards Jiahe	Line 2	Zhanmatun towards Zhengzhou Hangkonggang Railway Station
Location
- Location within Zhengzhou

Nansanhuan (Chinese: 南三环) is a metro station of Zhengzhou Metro Line 2.

"Nansanhuan" refers to the South 3rd Ring Road, which is a long road. Just like Xisanhuan, the naming of this station is controversial on some local forums.

== Station layout ==
The 2-level underground station has a single island platform. The station concourse is on the B1 level and the B2 level is for the platforms.

G	-	Exits
B1	Concourse	Customer service center, Vending machines
B2; Platforms	Platform 2	← Line 2 towards Jiahe (Huazhai)
B2; Platforms	Island platform, doors will open on the left
B2; Platforms	Platform 1	Line 2 towards Nansihuan (Zhanmatun) →

== Exits ==
Exit	Destination
Exit A	Zijingshan South Road (south)
Exit B	South 3rd Ring Road (west)
Exit C	Zijingshan South Road (north)
Exit D	South 3rd Ring Road (east)
