= Huazhai station =

Metro station in Zhengzhou, China

Huazhai 花寨
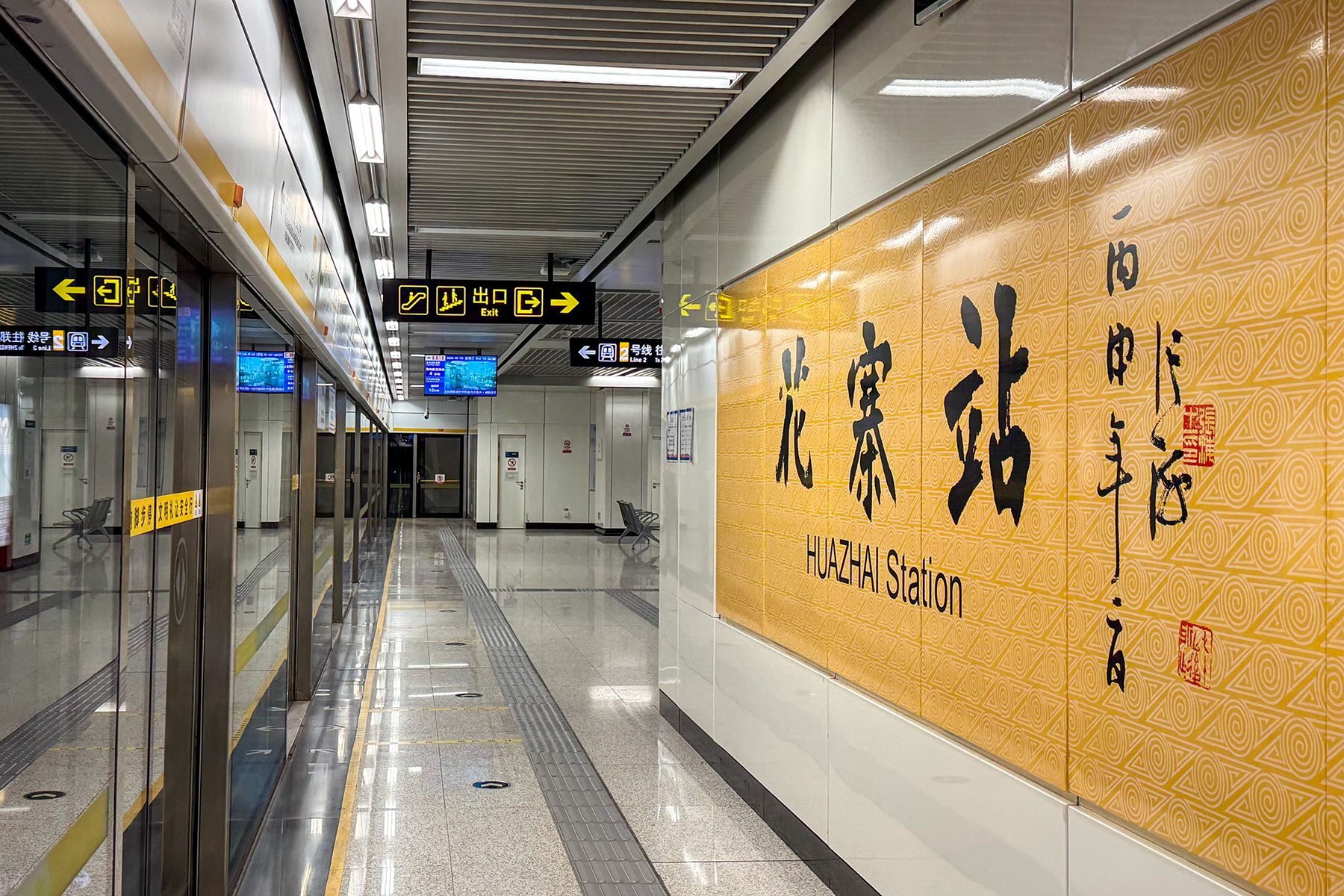
- Platform

General information
- Location: Zijingshan South Road (between Changjiang Road and Duanwu Road); Guancheng, Zhengzhou; China
- Coordinates: 34.7064°N 113.6761°E
- System: Zhengzhou Metro rapid transit station
- Operator: Zhengzhou Metro
- Line: Line 2
- Platforms: 2 (1 island platform)

Construction
- Structure type: Underground

Other information
- Station code: 233

History
- Opened: 19 August 2016

Services
Preceding station	Zhengzhou Metro	Following station
Nanwulibao towards Jiahe	Line 2	Nansanhuan towards Zhengzhou Hangkonggang Railway Station
Location
- Location within Zhengzhou

Huazhai (Chinese: 花寨) is a metro station of Zhengzhou Metro Line 2.

== Station layout ==
The 2-level underground station has a single island platform. The station concourse is on the B1 level and the B2 level is for the platforms.

G	-	Exits
B1	Concourse	Customer Service, Vending machines
B2; Platforms	Platform 2	← Line 2 towards Jiahe (Nanwulibao)
B2; Platforms	Island platform, doors will open on the left
B2; Platforms		Line 2 towards Nansihuan (Nansanhuan) →

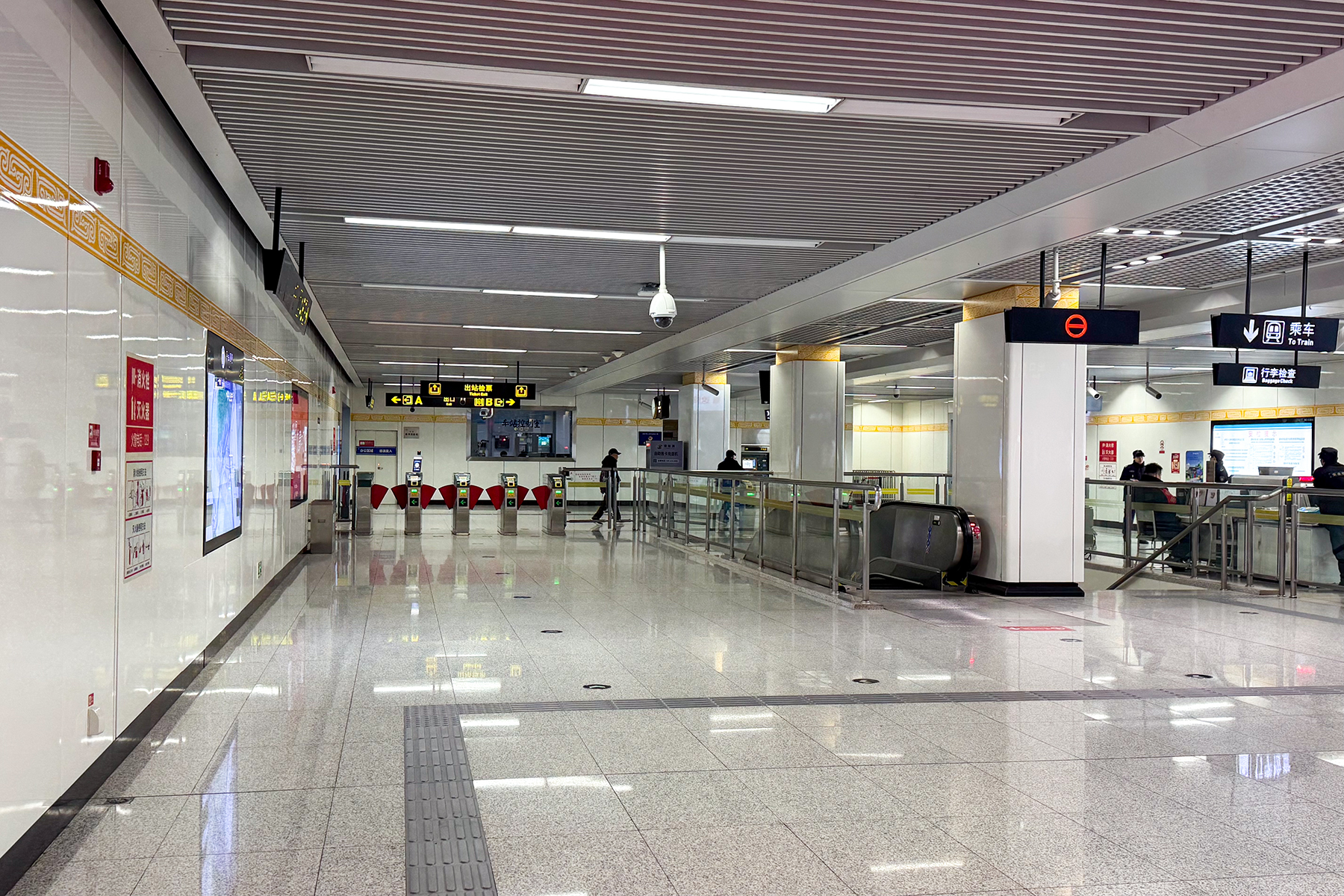
Concourse

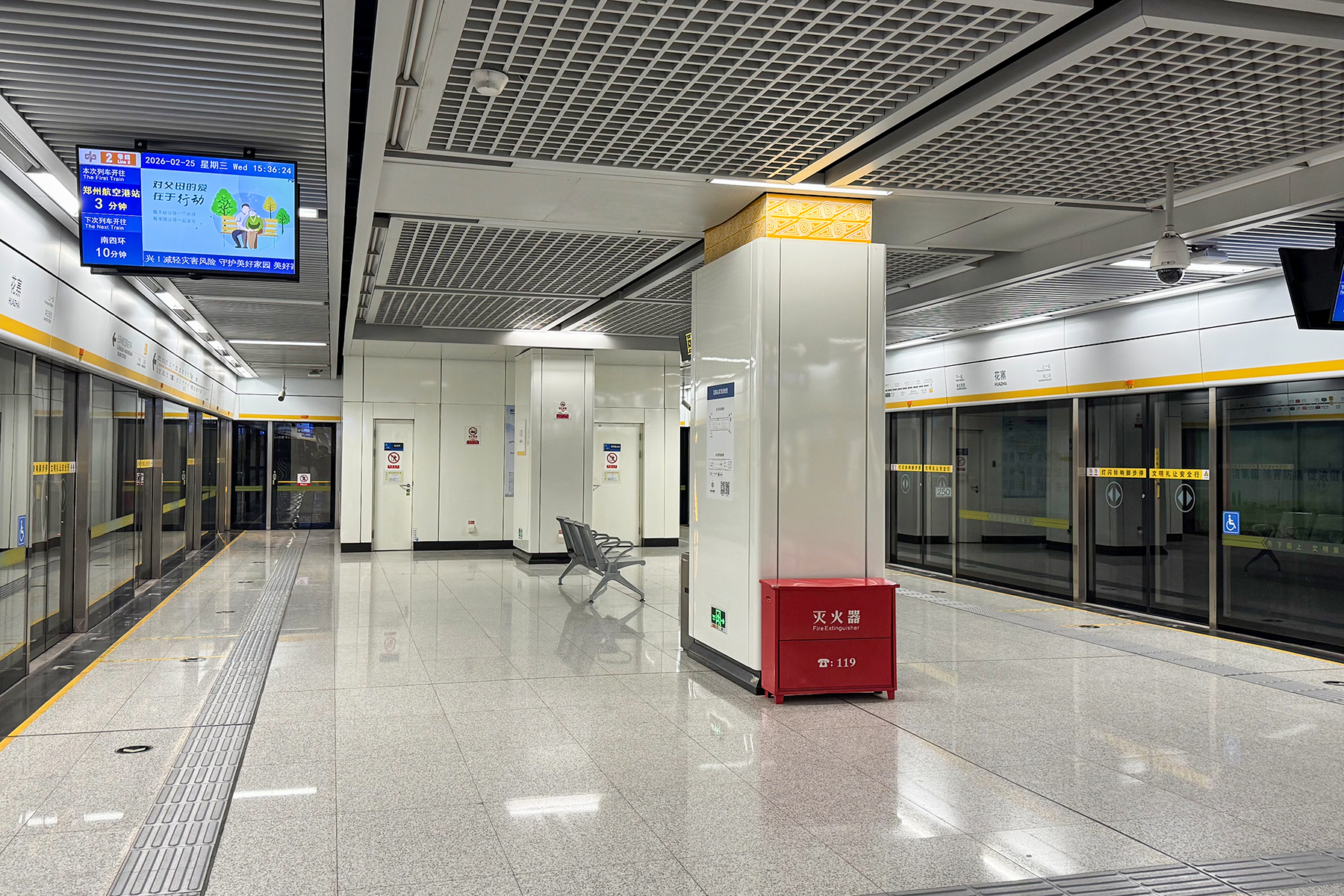
Platforms

== Exits ==
- A: Duanwu Road (east), Zijingshan South Road
- B: Duanwu Road (west), Zijingshan South Road
