= Nanwulibao station =

Metro station in Zhengzhou, China

Nanwulibao 南五里堡
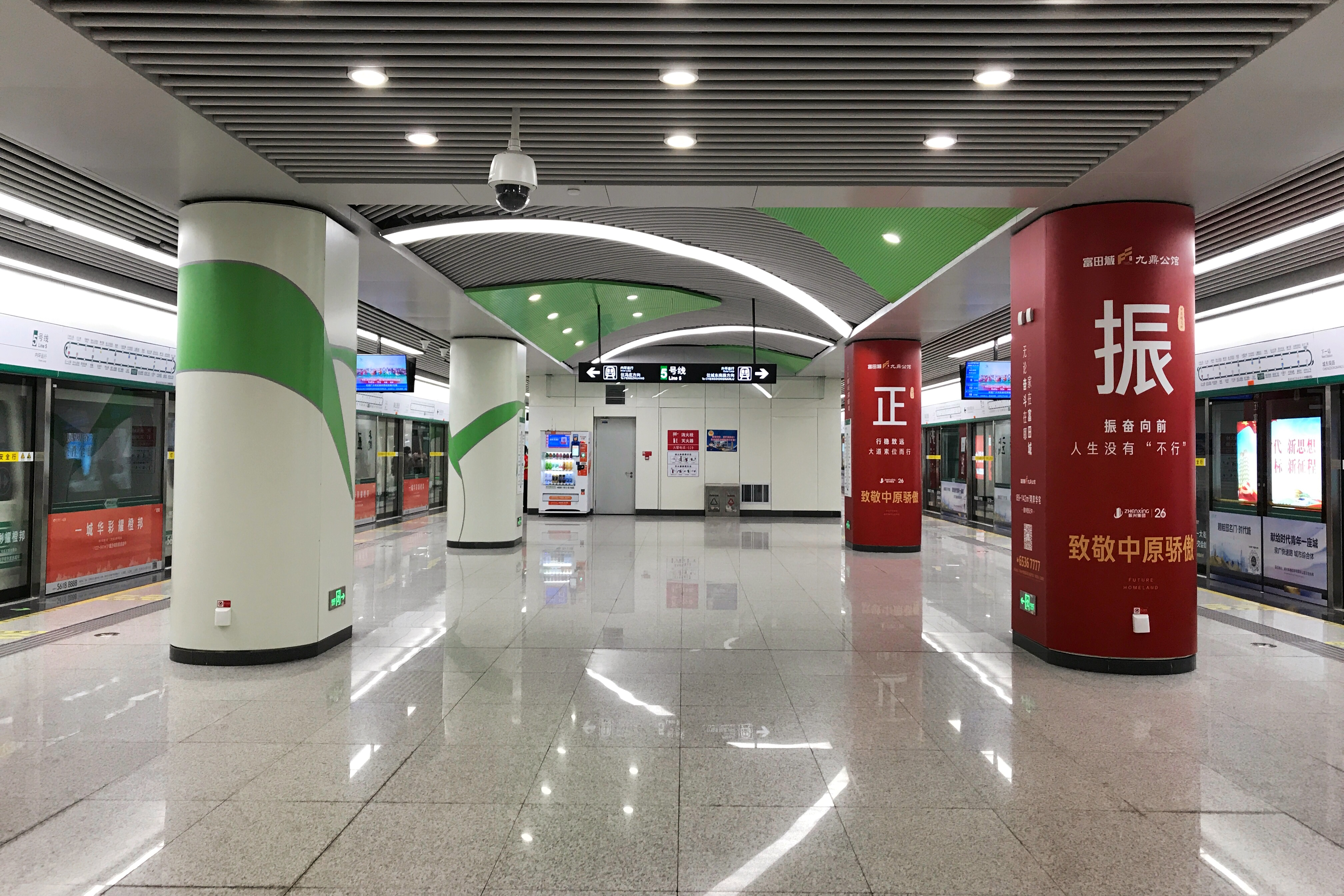
- Platform for Line 5

General information
- Location: Zijingshan Road × Hanghai East Road; Guancheng, Zhengzhou; China
- Coordinates: 34.7216°N 113.6751°E
- System: Zhengzhou Metro rapid transit station
- Operator: Zhengzhou Metro
- Lines: Line 2; Line 5
- Platforms: 4 (2 island platforms)
- Connections: Bus; Zhengzhou BRT

Construction
- Structure type: Underground

Other information
- Station code: 232

History
- Opened: 19 August 2016

Services
Preceding station	Zhengzhou Metro	Following station
Erligang towards Jiahe	Line 2	Huazhai towards Zhengzhou Hangkonggang Railway Station
Fengzhuang inner loop	Line 5	Chengdongnanlu outer loop
Location
- Location within Zhengzhou

Nanwulibao (Chinese: 南五里堡) is a metro station of Zhengzhou Metro. This station is an interchange station between Line 2 and Line 5 after Line 5 started operation on 20 May 2019.

== Station layout ==
G	-	Exits
-1F	Concourse	Customer service, Vending machines
-2F; Platforms	Platform 2	← Line 2 towards Jiahe (Erligang)
-2F; Platforms	Island platform, doors will open on the left
-2F; Platforms	Platform 1	Line 2 towards Nansihuan (Huazhai) →
-3F; Platforms	Platform 3	← Line 5 inner loop (Fengzhuang)
-3F; Platforms	Island platform, doors will open on the left
-3F; Platforms	Platform 4	Line 5 outer loop (Chengdongnanlu) →

== Exits ==
Exit	Destination
Exit A	
Exit D1	
