= Zhanmatun station =

Metro station in Zhengzhou, China

Zhanmatun 站马屯
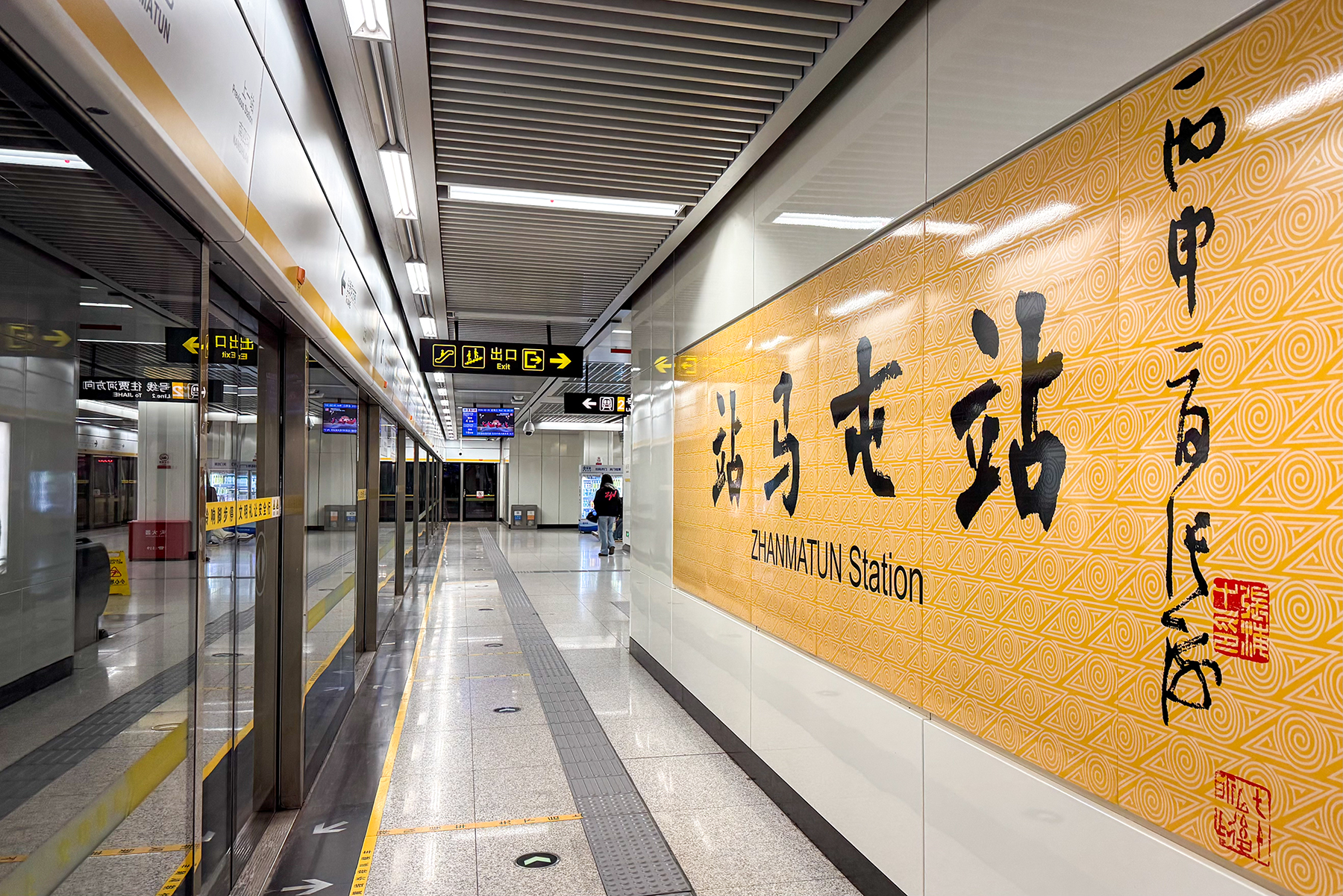
- Platform

General information
- Location: Zijingshan South Road × Yutong Road; Guancheng, Zhengzhou; China
- Coordinates: 34.68581°N 113.6764°E
- System: Zhengzhou Metro rapid transit station
- Operator: Zhengzhou Metro
- Line: Line 2
- Platforms: 2 (1 island platform)
- Connections: Bus

Construction
- Structure type: Underground

Other information
- Station code: 235

History
- Opened: 19 August 2016

Services
Preceding station	Zhengzhou Metro	Following station
Nansanhuan towards Jiahe	Line 2	Nansihuan towards Zhengzhou Hangkonggang Railway Station
Location
- Location within Zhengzhou

Zhanmatun (Chinese: 站马屯) is a metro station of Zhengzhou Metro Line 2.

== Station layout ==
The 2-level underground station has a single island platform. The station concourse is on the B1 level and the B2 level is for the platforms.

G	-	Exits
B1	Concourse	Customer Service, Vending machines
B2; Platforms	Platform 2	← Line 2 towards Jiahe (Nansanhuan)
B2; Platforms	Island platform, doors will open on the left
B2; Platforms	Platform 1	Line 2 towards Nansihuan (Nansihuan) →

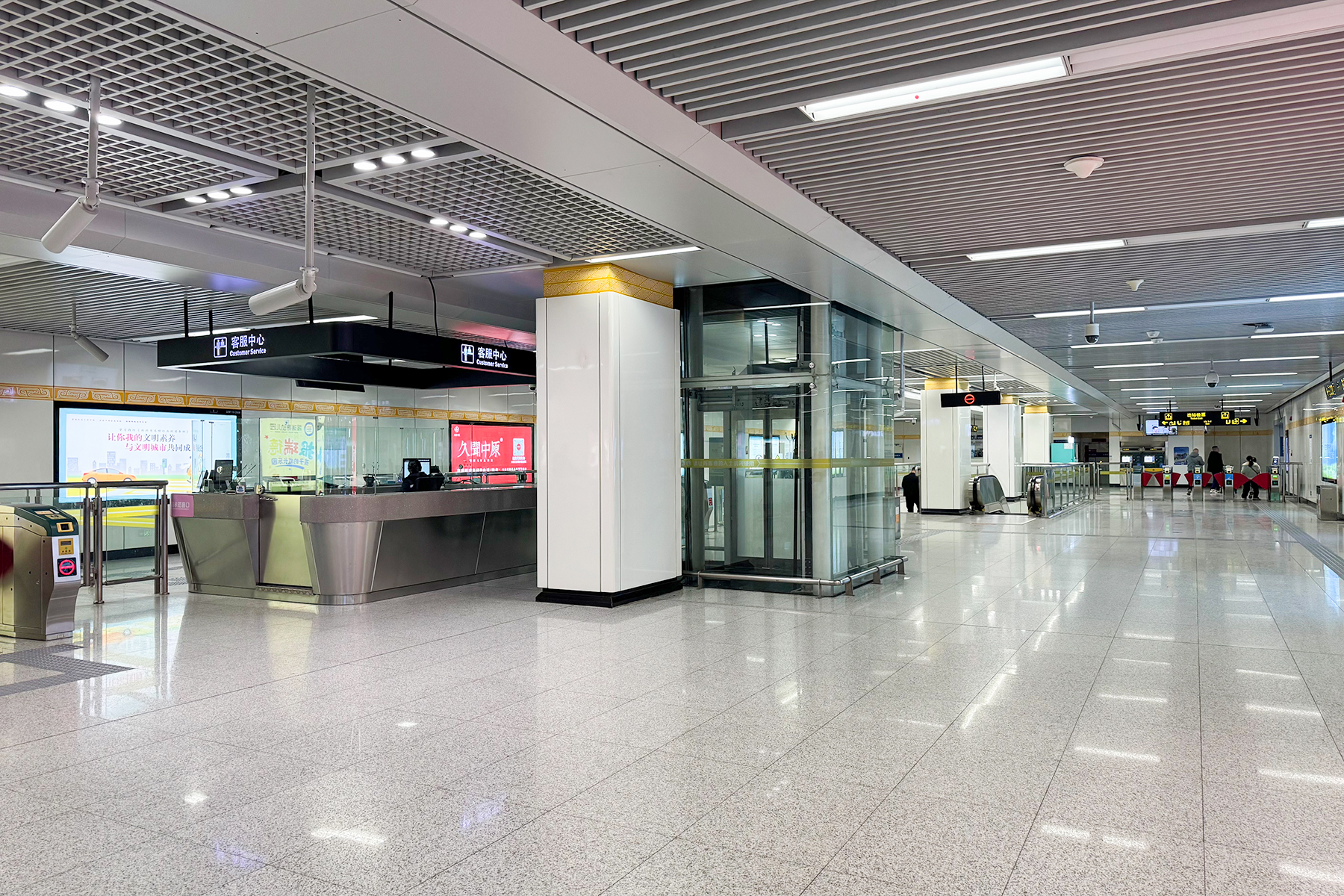
Concourse

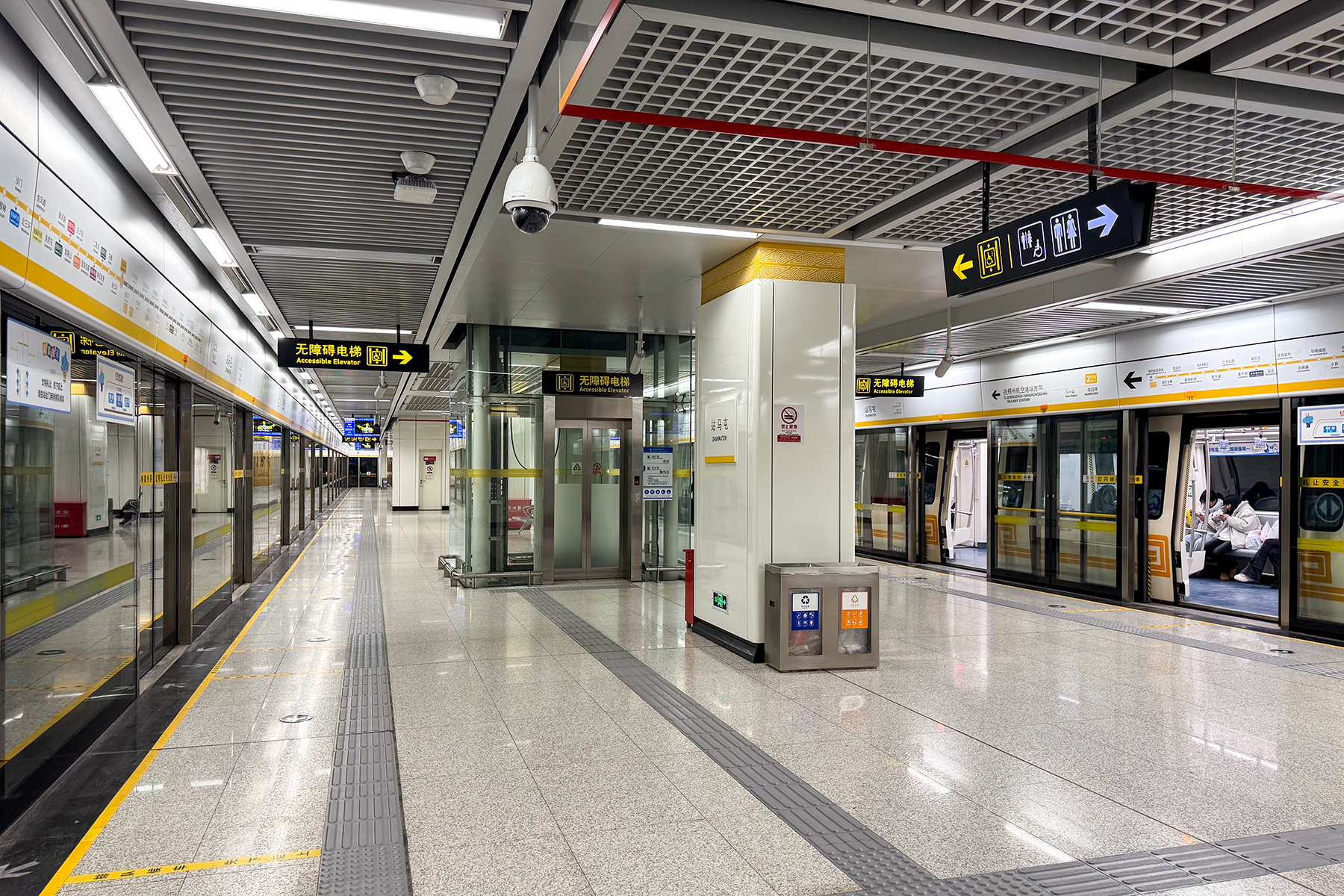
Platforms

== Exits ==
- B: Yutong Road (north side)
- C: Huanghe S&T College
- D: Zijingshan South Road (east side)
