= Xiaoqiao station =

Metro station in Zhengzhou, China

Xiaoqiao 小乔
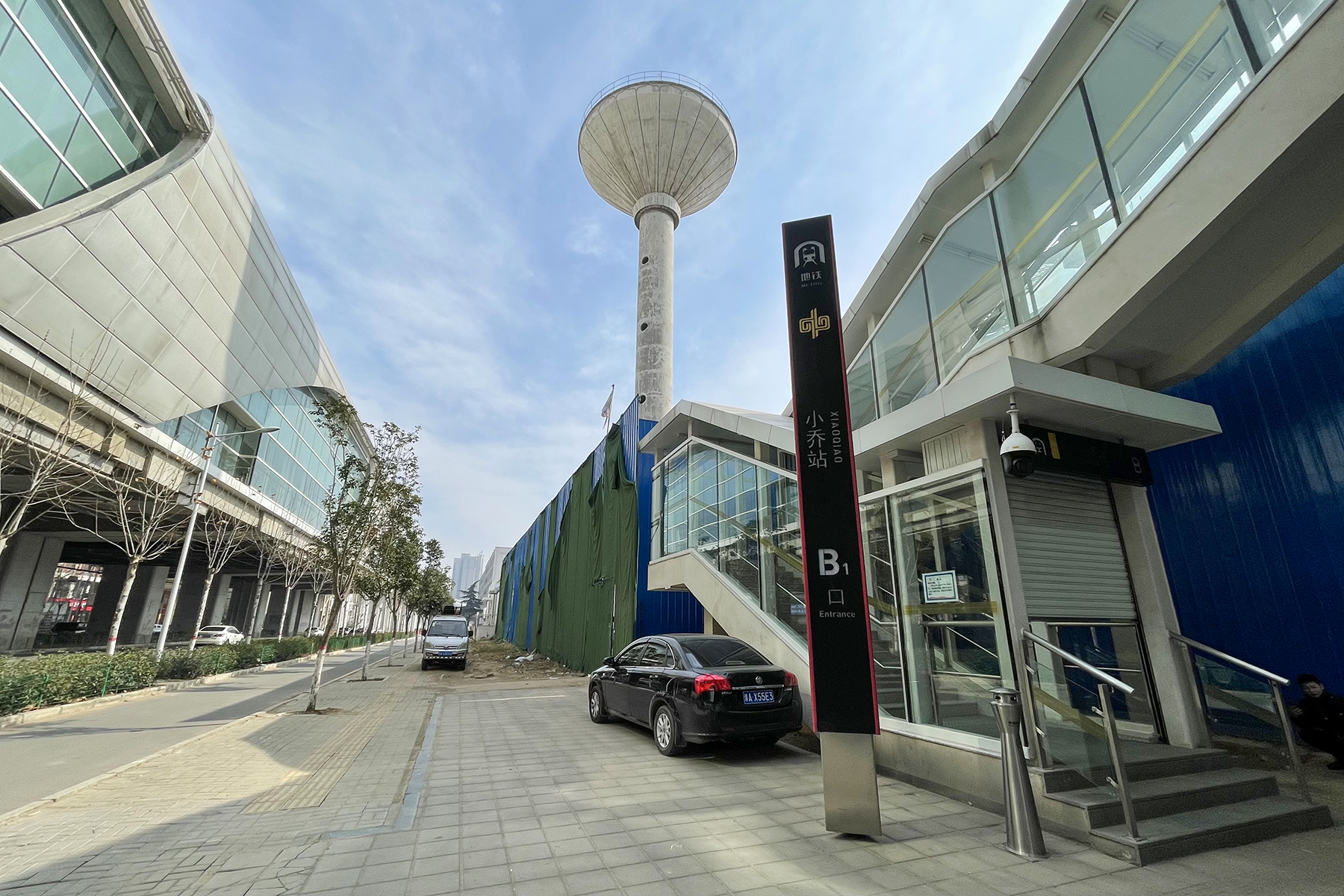
- Exit B1

General information
- Location: Longhu Town, Xinzheng, Zhengzhou, Henan; China
- Coordinates: 34.6017°N 113.6885°E
- System: Zhengzhou Metro rapid transit station
- Operator: Zhengzhou Metro
- Line: Chengjiao line
- Platforms: 2

Construction
- Structure type: Elevated

Other information
- Status: Operational
- Station code: 240

History
- Opened: 22 September 2023
Location
- Location within Zhengzhou

Xiaoqiao (Chinese: 小乔) is a metro station of Zhengzhou Metro Chengjiao line. The station opened on 22 September 2023.

== History ==
The station was planned to open with other stations on Chengjiao line. However, a store called "Old Mr. Liu's Supermarket" (老刘超市), a building with three floors, stands on the planned site of an exit of the station and the owner refused to accept the compensation for expropriation. As a result, the exit could not be built. Due to insufficient exits, the station failed to meet the requirement of fire control acceptance.

The metro station opened on 22 September 2023.
