= Nansihuan station =

Metro station in Zhengzhou, China

Nansihuan 南四环
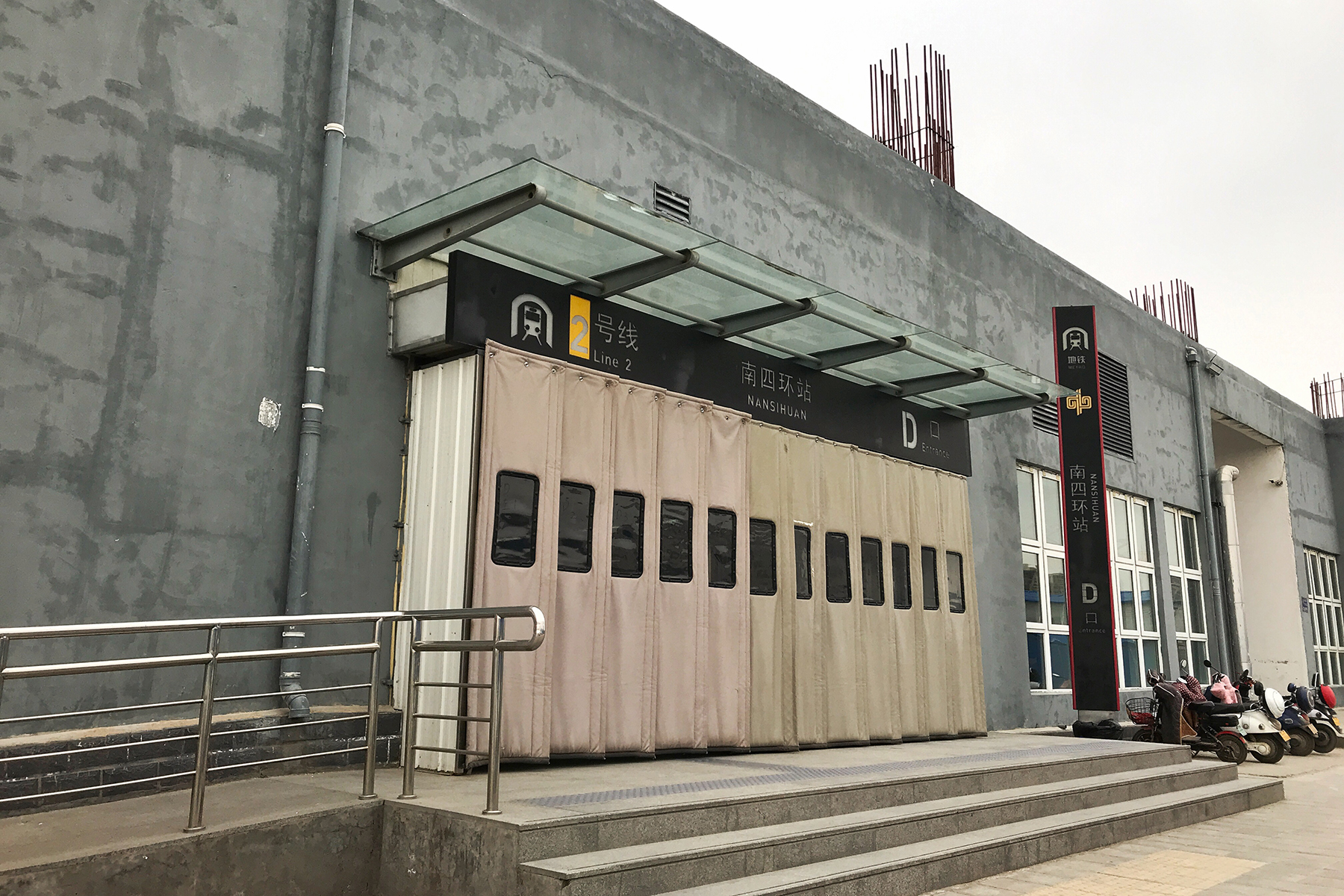

General information
- Location: South 4th Ring Road; Guancheng, Zhengzhou; China
- Coordinates: 34.6637°N 113.6757°E
- System: Zhengzhou Metro rapid transit station
- Operator: Zhengzhou Metro
- Lines: Line 2; Chengjiao line
- Platforms: 2 (1 island platform)
- Connections: Bus

Construction
- Structure type: Underground

Other information
- Station code: 236

History
- Opened: 19 August 2016

Services
Preceding station	Zhengzhou Metro	Following station
Zhanmatun towards Jiahe	Line 2	Terminus
through to Line 2	Chengjiao line through services via Line 2	Shibalihe towards Zhengzhou Hangkonggang Railway Station
Location
- Location within Zhengzhou

Nansihuan (Chinese: 南四环) is a metro station of Zhengzhou Metro. The station currently serves as the southern terminus of Line 2 trains and an interchange station to Chengjiao line towards Xinzheng International Airport.

== Station layout ==
The station concourse is located on the ground level while the single island platform is underground on the B1 level.

G
Concourse

Exits, Customer Service, Vending machines
B1
Platforms
Platform 2
← Line 2 towards Jiahe (Zhanmatun)

← Chengjiao line through services via Line 2

Island platform
Platform 1
Line 2 termination platform →

Chengjiao line towards Zhengzhou Hangkonggang Railway Station (Shibalihe) →

B2
Equipment

== Exits ==
Exit	Destination
Exit A	Zhongzhou Avenue
Exit B	Zhongzhou Avenue
Exit C	4th Ring Road (South)
Exit D	4th Ring Road (South)
