= Xinzheng =

Xinzheng 新郑市 Sincheng
- County-level city
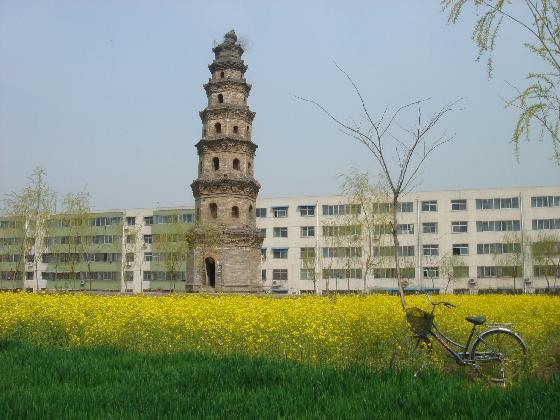
- Pagoda in Xinzheng with Soviet architecture in the background

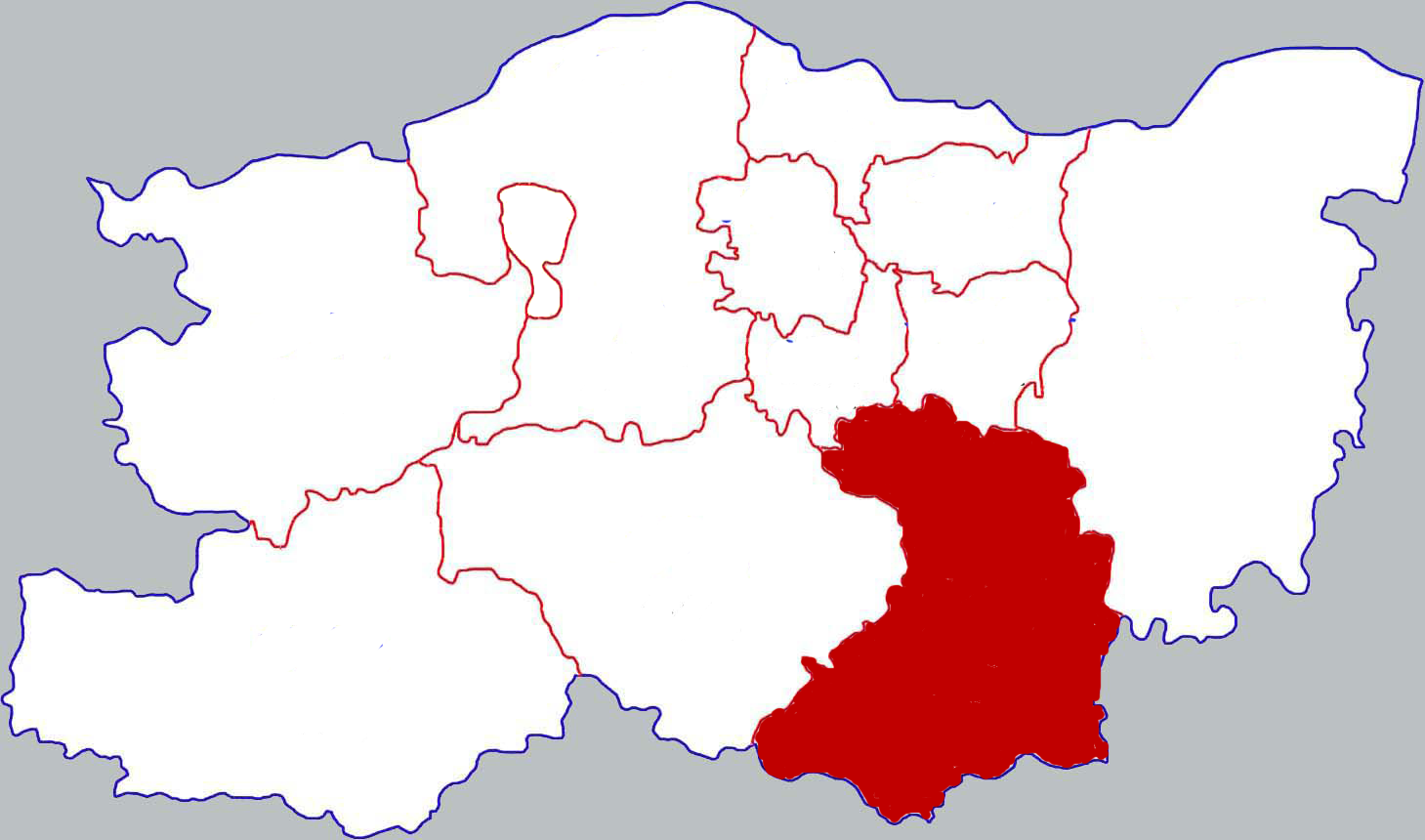
- Location in Zhengzhou

- Location in Henan
- Coordinates (Xinzheng municipal government): 34°23′47″N 113°44′25″E
- Country: People's Republic of China
- Province: Henan
- Prefecture-level city: Zhengzhou

Area
  - Total: 873 km^{2} (337 sq mi)
- Elevation: 114 m (374 ft)

Population (2019)
  - Total: 989,900
  - Density: 1,130/km^{2} (2,940/sq mi)
- Time zone: UTC+8 (China Standard)
- Postal code: 451100
- Website: www.xinzheng.gov.cn

Xinzheng (simplified Chinese: 新郑; traditional Chinese: 新鄭; pinyin: Xīnzhèng; Zhengzhou dialect: sin²⁴ ʈ͡ʂəŋ³¹²/) is a county-level city of Henan Province, China. It is under the administration of the prefecture-level city of Zhengzhou, the provincial capital. The city has a population of 600,000 people and covers an area of 873 km^{2} (337 sq mi), 15 km^{2} (5.8 sq mi) of which is urban.

== History ==
Xinzheng is considered one of the birthplaces of the Chinese nation. More than 8000 years ago, Neolithic people of Peiligang culture lived in the vicinity. The legendary Yellow Emperor was said to have been born in Xinzheng 5000 years ago. During the Zhou dynasty it was the capital of the state of Zheng and later, the state of Han, after the conquest of the former by the latter. It was the seat of government for the Qin dynasty, from about 221 BCE, which is considered the beginning of a unified China. The word qin (秦), which is pronounced similar to "chin", is thought to be the basis for the word "China."

Historically, this prefecture was an integrated part of Zhengzhou. However, in 1994, the Henan Provincial Council authorized the incorporation of Xinzheng into a separate municipality.

== Administrative divisions ==
As of 2012, this city is divided to three subdistricts, nine towns and three townships.

Subdistricts

- Xinjianlu Subdistrict (新建路街道)
- Xinhualu Subdistrict (新华路街道)
- Xinyan Subdistrict (新烟街道)

Towns

- Xincun (新村镇)
- Xindian (辛店镇)
- Guanyinsi (观音寺镇)
- Lihe (梨河镇)
- Hezhuang (和庄镇)
- Xuedian (薛店镇)
- Mengzhuang (孟庄镇)
- Guodian (郭店镇)
- Longhu (龙湖镇)

Townships

- Chengguan Township (城关乡)
- Baqian Township (八千乡)
- Longwang Township (龙王乡)

== Climate ==
Climate data for Xinzheng, elevation 117 m (384 ft), (1991–2020 normals, extremes 1981–2010)
Month	Jan	Feb	Mar	Apr	May	Jun	Jul	Aug	Sep	Oct	Nov	Dec	Year
Record high °C (°F)	21.0 (69.8)	24.2 (75.6)	27.7 (81.9)	35.5 (95.9)	38.5 (101.3)	39.7 (103.5)	41.0 (105.8)	38.5 (101.3)	38.6 (101.5)	36.8 (98.2)	28.1 (82.6)	23.9 (75.0)	41.0 (105.8)
Mean daily maximum °C (°F)	5.8 (42.4)	9.2 (48.6)	16.0 (60.8)	22.0 (71.6)	27.7 (81.9)	32.0 (89.6)	31.9 (89.4)	30.6 (87.1)	26.7 (80.1)	21.8 (71.2)	14.5 (58.1)	8.2 (46.8)	20.5 (69.0)
Daily mean °C (°F)	0.6 (33.1)	3.8 (38.8)	10.2 (50.4)	16.1 (61.0)	21.9 (71.4)	26.3 (79.3)	27.3 (81.1)	26.0 (78.8)	21.4 (70.5)	16.0 (60.8)	9.0 (48.2)	2.8 (37.0)	15.1 (59.2)
Mean daily minimum °C (°F)	−3.3 (26.1)	−0.4 (31.3)	5.2 (41.4)	10.7 (51.3)	16.3 (61.3)	21.0 (69.8)	23.5 (74.3)	22.5 (72.5)	17.3 (63.1)	11.6 (52.9)	4.7 (40.5)	−1.3 (29.7)	10.7 (51.2)
Record low °C (°F)	−14.8 (5.4)	−17.9 (−0.2)	−6.2 (20.8)	−1.3 (29.7)	4.9 (40.8)	10.4 (50.7)	17.0 (62.6)	12.5 (54.5)	6.3 (43.3)	−0.5 (31.1)	−10.4 (13.3)	−13.6 (7.5)	−17.9 (−0.2)
Average precipitation mm (inches)	11.0 (0.43)	13.7 (0.54)	23.3 (0.92)	38.0 (1.50)	57.7 (2.27)	74.4 (2.93)	148.3 (5.84)	121 (4.8)	78.3 (3.08)	44.0 (1.73)	30.8 (1.21)	9.5 (0.37)	650 (25.62)
Average precipitation days (≥ 0.1 mm)	3.9	4.2	5.3	5.9	6.9	7.5	11.4	10.3	8.7	6.1	5.4	3.5	79.1
Average snowy days	4.0	3.2	1.1	0.2	0	0	0	0	0	0	1.2	2.8	12.5
Average relative humidity (%)	60	60	60	62	62	62	76	78	74	67	66	61	66
Mean monthly sunshine hours	118.5	127.5	167.1	193.7	208.5	194.7	172.7	171.5	150.2	151.2	138.7	132.0	1,926.3
Percentage possible sunshine	38	41	45	49	48	45	40	42	41	44	45	43	43
Source: China Meteorological Administration

== Education ==
Xinzheng has one of the largest concentrations of foreign teachers in central China due to the presence of Sias International University. The school has over 27,000 students and over 120 foreign teachers and their 40 dependent family members. Along with Sias University, the city is also home to another university: ShengDa.

== Economy ==
Xinzheng has a diversified economy, though agriculture and heavy industry dominate the economic landscape.

=== Agriculture ===
Xinzheng's agriculture involves the cultivation of maize, cotton, tobacco and other industrial crops. The city is well known for its jujube or Chinese Date. At harvest time, large quantities of these fruits are sold in markets, as well as on the side of the roads into the town.

=== Industry ===
Xinzheng is home to several industrial factories, namely cigarette factories, which are located near the center of town. In 2006, more than US$2 billion was invested in a nearby industrial project, although the status of this investment is currently unknown. Mining coal locally has also been an important source of income.

=== Impact of educational institutions ===
Two large private universities, ShengDa University and Sias International University play a major role in the local economy as well. ShengDa has 14,000 students, and Sias University has over 27,000 students. Service industries (restaurants, hotels, banks, retail shops, etc.) to accommodate the students have sprung out around the universities in abundance. At Sias, the administration tacitly allows students to live off campus, creating a large community of landlords around the university. The presence of 40,000 students has had an undeniable and long lasting impact on the community.

=== Tourism ===
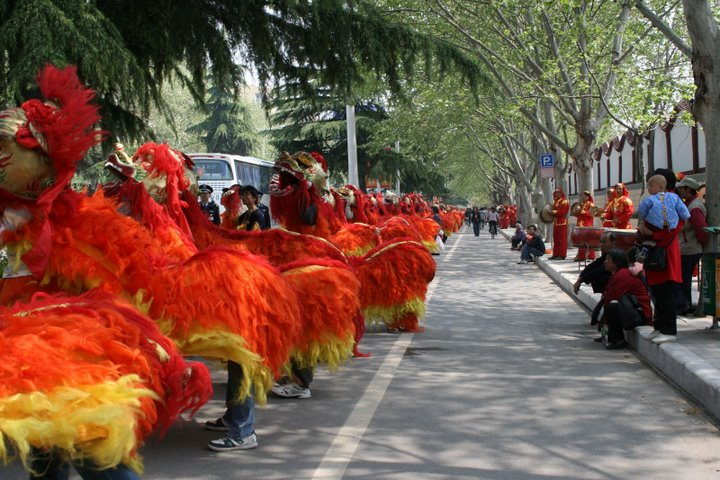
Yellow Emperor Celebrations on the streets of Henan

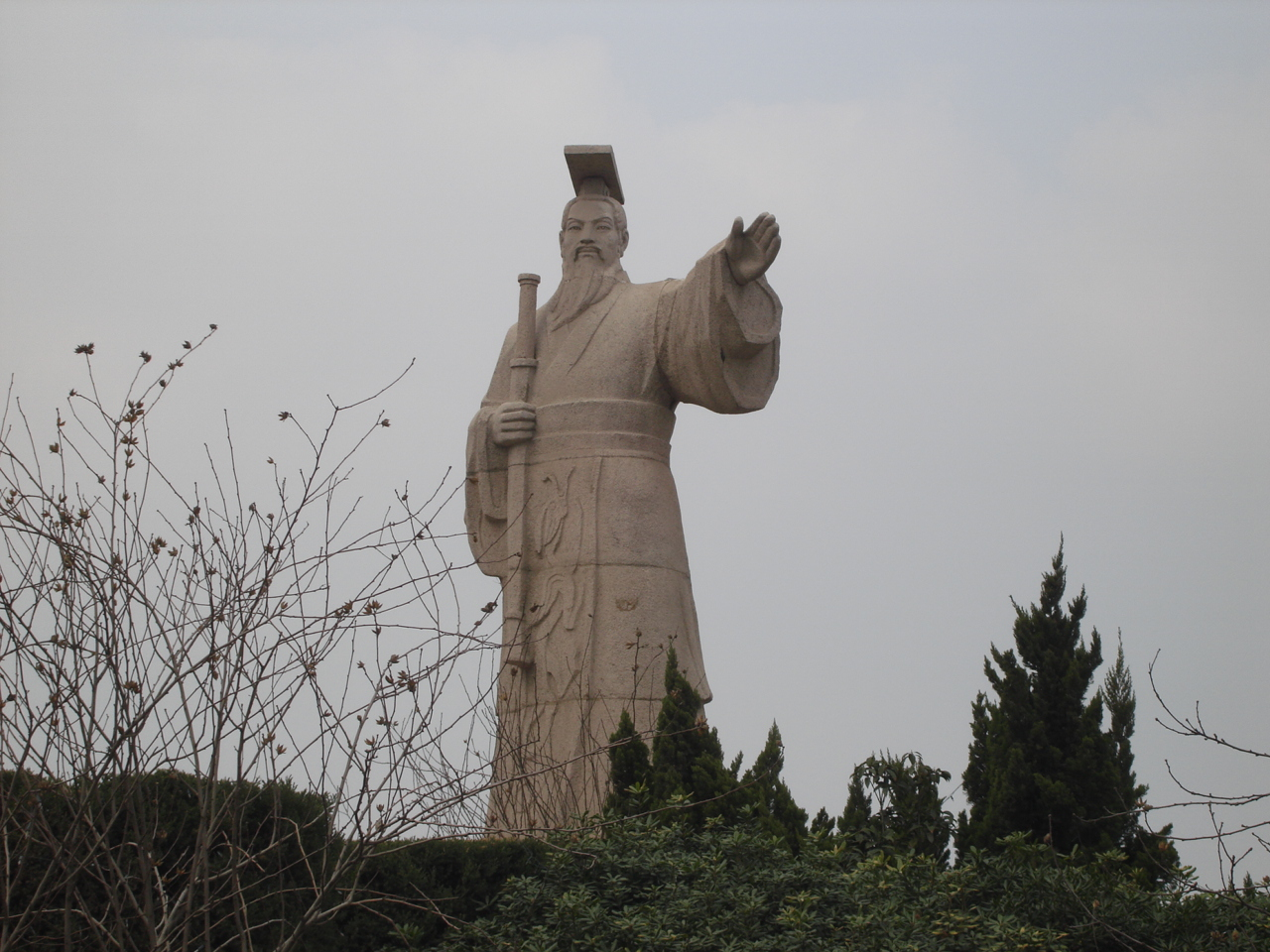
Huangdi Statue on Renmin Lu, Xinzheng

Due to limited accommodation, lack of infrastructure, pollution and other factors, tourism has been slow to take off in Xinzheng. Every Spring, the city hosts a ceremony honoring the Yellow Emperor, the legendary ancestor of the Chinese nation. In 2009, this celebration attracted over 10,000 Chinese people from within the People's Republic of China, as well as many Overseas Chinese.

However, many of these guests find accommodations in nearby Zhengzhou, and the economic impact to the city is minimal. Xinzheng is said to be an 'open-air' museum, and the nearby Shizu mountain is said to be the exact birthplace of the Yellow Emperor. The Zhengzhou Dragon realization company began construction at the turn of the 21st century of a large concrete dragon that would straddle the mountain.

A giant dragon was being constructed by private investors near the city out of concrete and marble with a 29.9m tall head and a body that would have stretched 21 km (13 mi) along the ridge line of Shizu Mountain. The hollow body of the dragon was slated to be 9m high and 6m wide and would have contained a light rail system along with facilities for sight seeing and leisure, such as shops, restaurants and luxury clubs. The project was expected to be completed before October 1, 2009, to celebrate the 60th anniversary of the founding of the People's Republic of China. However, lack of funding, and a general lack of interest, left the project unfinished.

== Transportation ==
=== Air ===
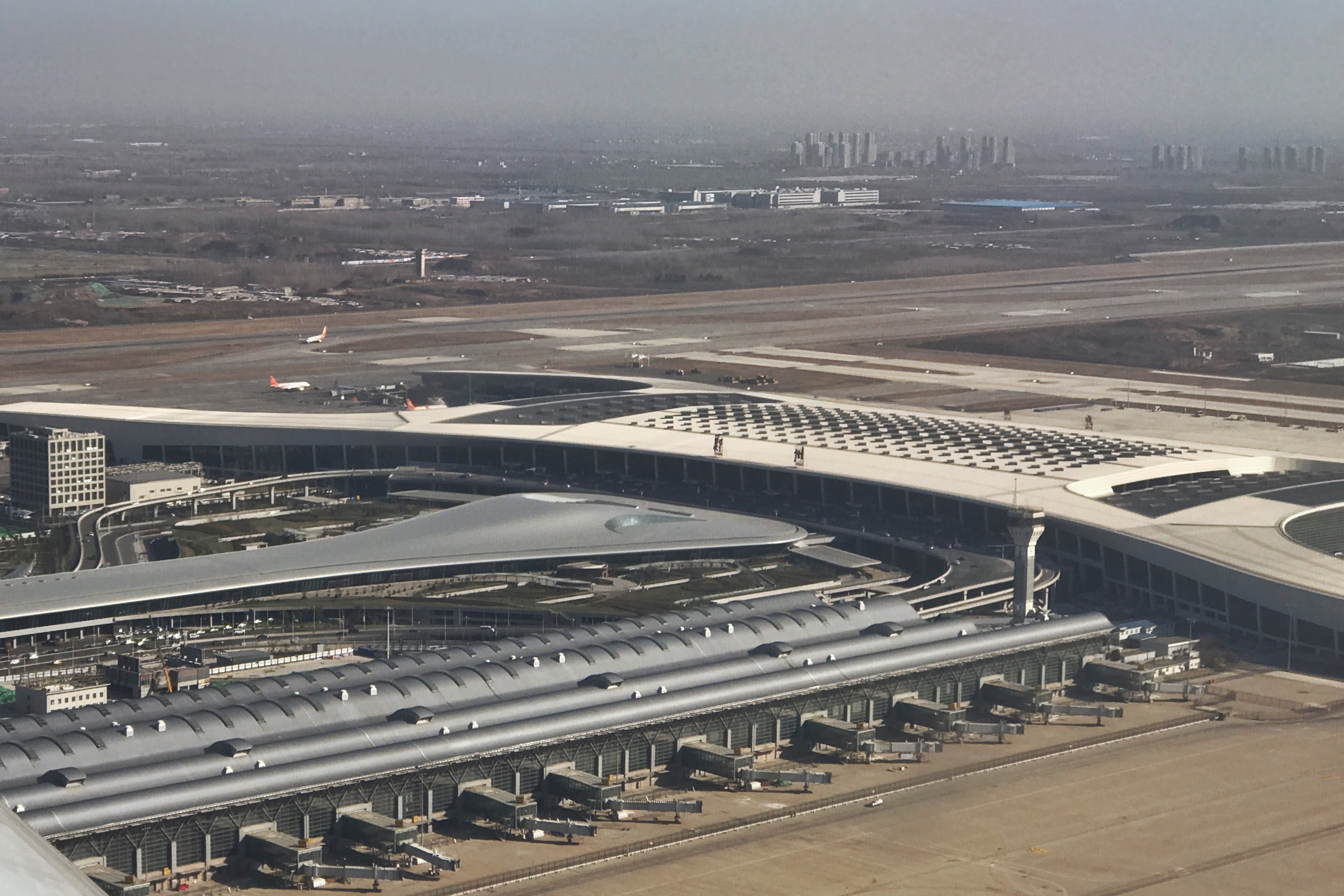
Aerial View of Zhengzhou Xinzheng Airport

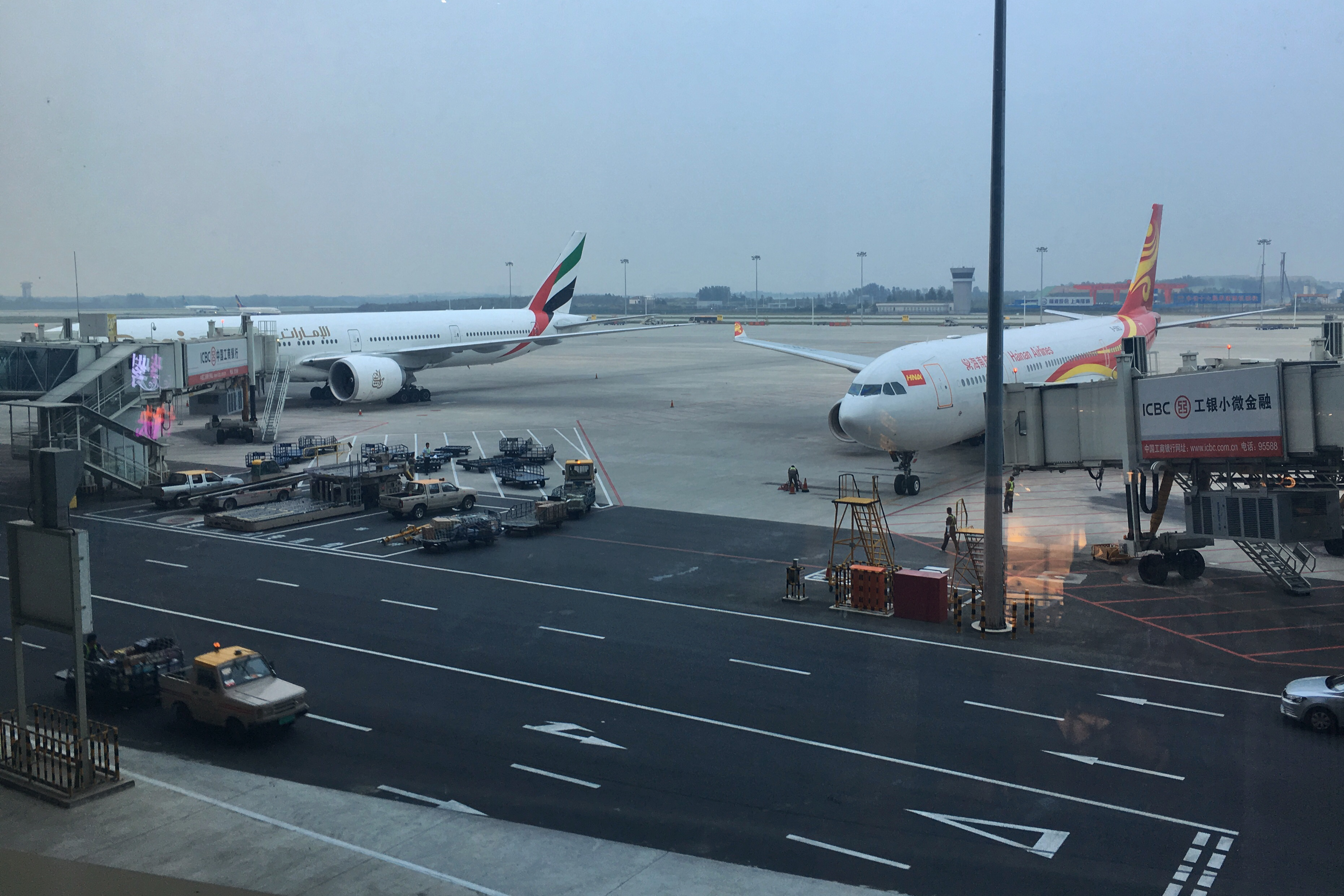
Zhengzhou Xinzheng International Airport (CGO)

The airport that serves the provincial capital, Zhengzhou Xinzheng International Airport (IATA: CGO, ICAO: ZHCC), is located in Xinzheng. This is of particular importance not only because it is an airport for a large urban center, but because it is the only international airport for the province of 100 million. On February 8, 2009, a nonstop air route between Zhengzhou and Taipei–Taoyuan was launched; this route was initially operated by Shenzhen Airlines.

=== Rail ===
As in the rest of China, rail transport in Xinzheng is handled by the China Railway Corporation. Xinzheng itself had a small railroad station, Xinzheng railway station, at the edge of town that used to accommodate trains on the Beijing–Guangzhou railway, as well as to and from Zhengzhou. It is no longer open.

However, nearby Zhengzhou is a major railway hub, with services radiating in all directions nationally. As of 2007, high-speed rail service began between Zhengzhou and Beijing. To do any travel beyond the Zhengzhou immediate area, most residents travel to Zhengzhou, then onward.

=== Mass transit ===
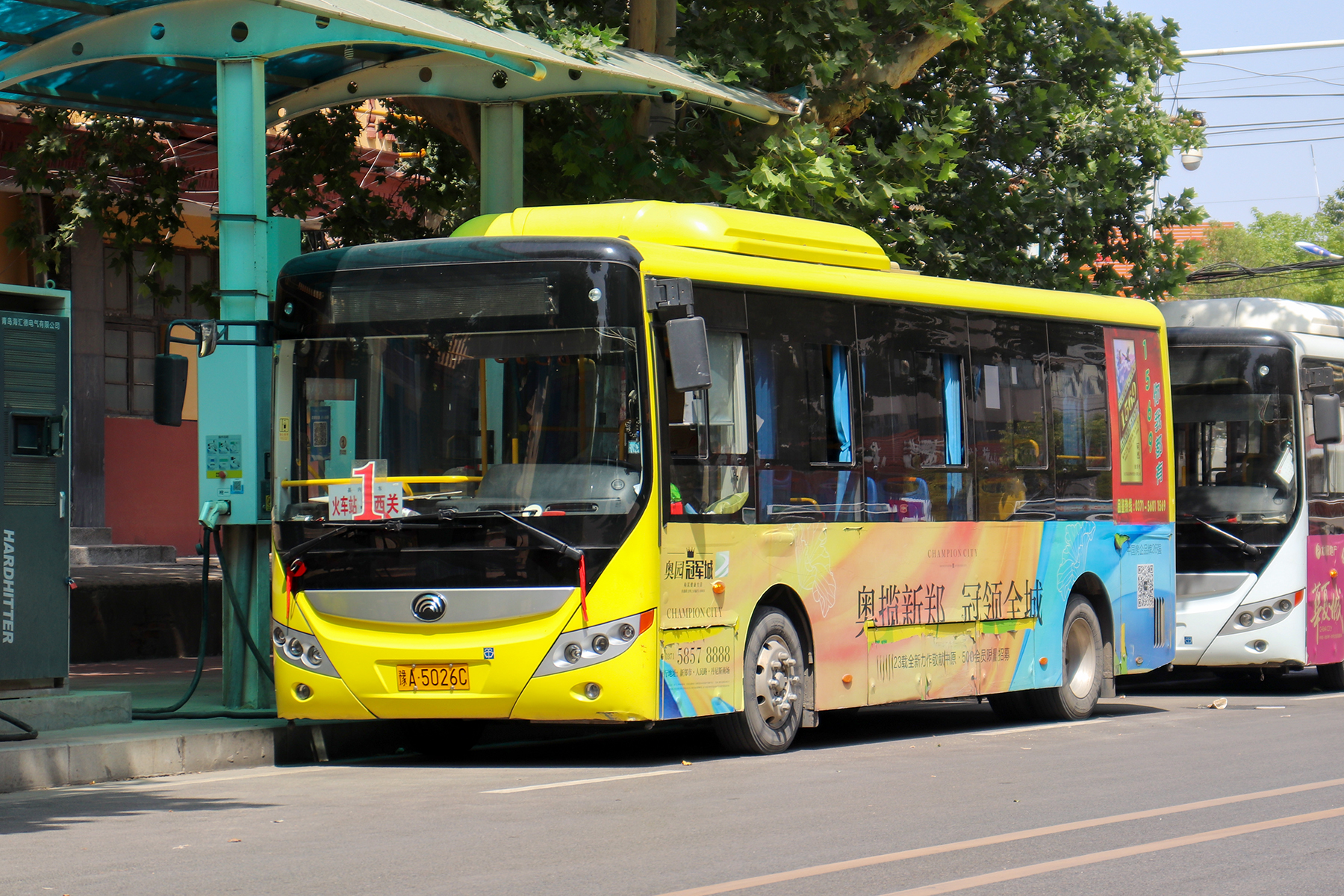
Xinzheng Bus Route 1 Yutong E8

The regional bus station to the north of the town's city center (34°26′12″N 113°45′21″E) serves buses destined for Zhengzhou, Xinmi, Kaifeng, and Luoyang.

=== Taxi ===
All Xinzheng taxis belong to the same local company, with a starting fare of 6 renminbi.

=== Roads ===
Xinzheng is well connected to Zhengzhou and points south by China National Highway 107. All inter-city roads are well maintained. Within the city limits, as in the rest of many small Chinese cities, many residential roads remain in a serious state of disrepair.

== Image gallery ==
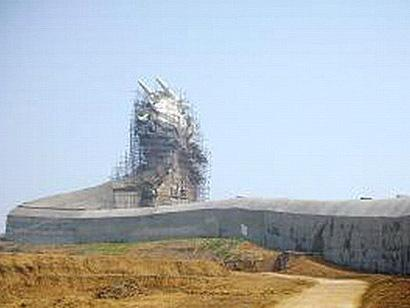
Construction of the Dragon on Shizu Mountain in Xinzheng

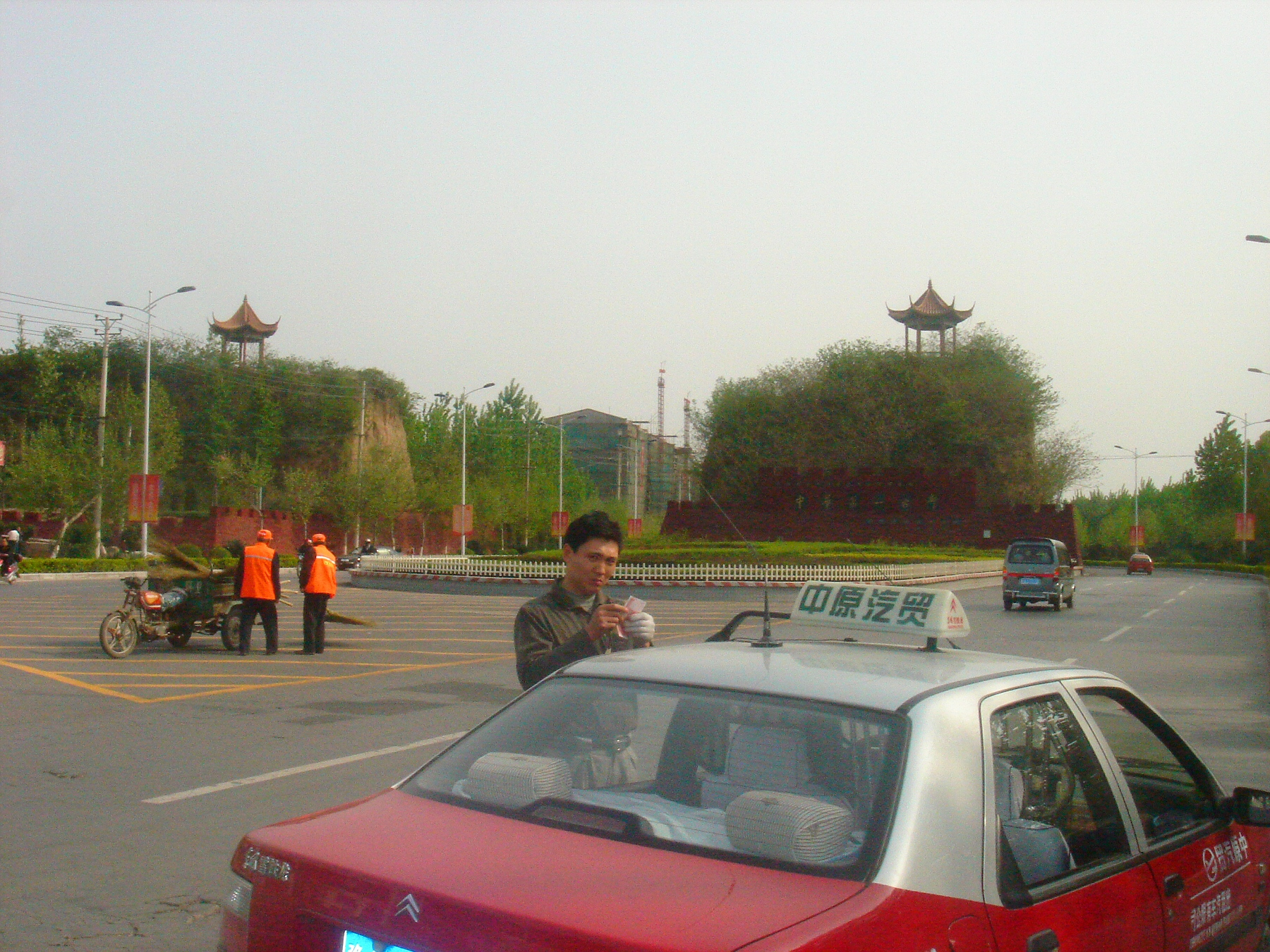
Entrance into West Xinzheng

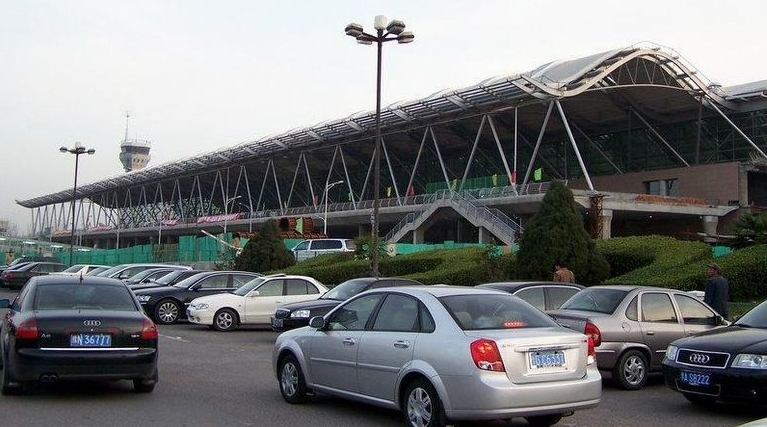
Zhengzhou Xinzheng International Airport
