= Jiahe station =

Metro station in Zhengzhou, China

Jiahe 贾河
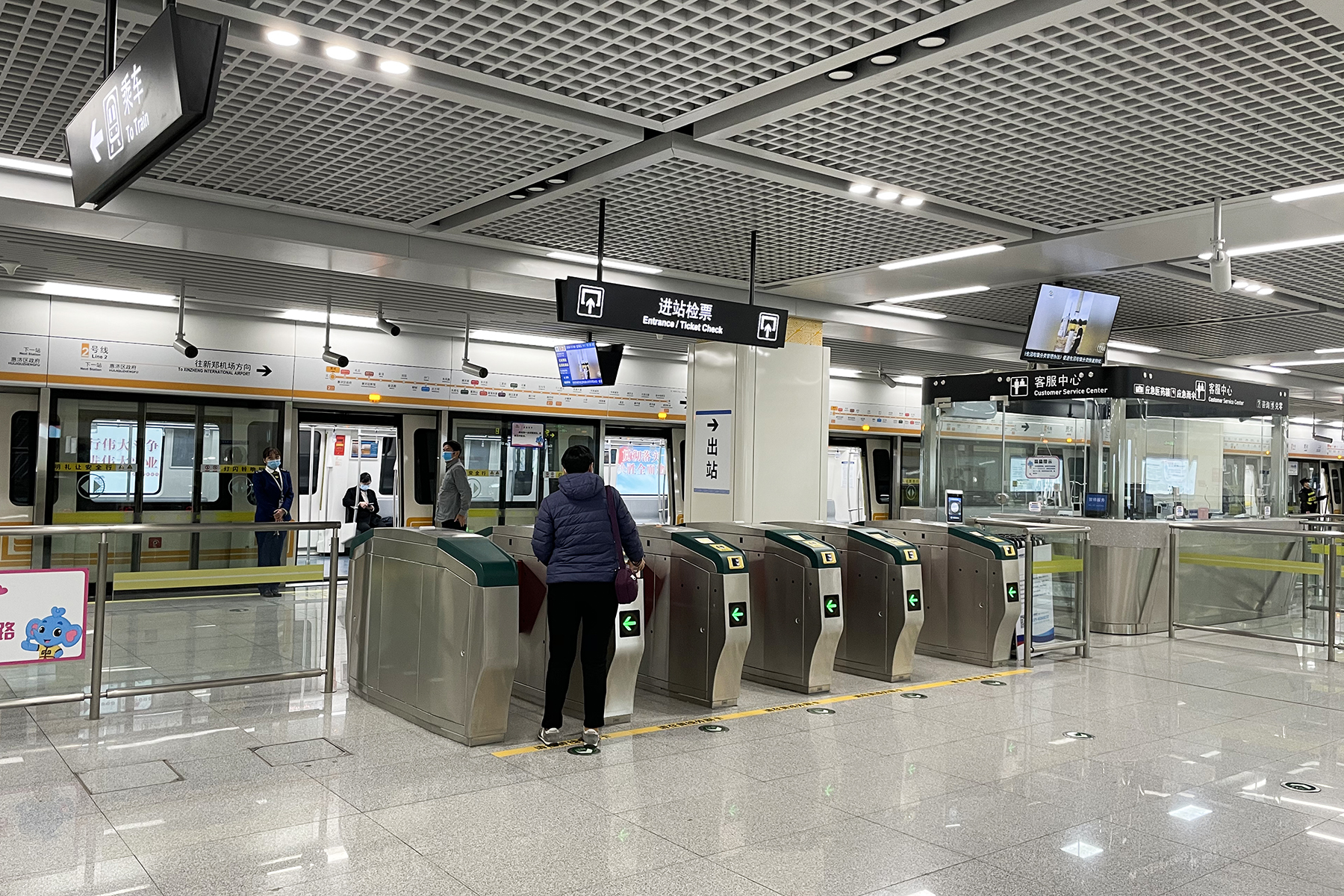

General information
- Location: Kaiyuan Road × Mojie Road; Huiji District, Zhengzhou; China
- Coordinates: 34.86848°N 113.58710°E
- System: Zhengzhou Metro rapid transit station
- Operator: Zhengzhou Metro
- Line: Line 2
- Platforms: 2 side platforms
- Connections: Bus

Construction
- Structure type: Underground

Other information
- Station code: 0215

History
- Opened: 28 December 2019

Services
Preceding station	Zhengzhou Metro	Following station
Terminus	Line 2	Huijiquzhengfu towards Zhengzhou Hangkonggang Railway Station
Location
- Location within Zhengzhou

Jiahe (Chinese: 贾河) is a metro station of Zhengzhou Metro Line 2. It currently serves as the northern terminus of Line 2.

== Station layout ==
The 2-level underground station has two side platforms and two concourses. The station concourses and the platforms are on the B1 level and the B2 level is a tunnel connecting two concourses.

G		Exit A-D
B1	North concourse	Customer service, Vending machines
B1	Side platform, doors will open on the right
B1	Line 2	← termination platform
B1	Line 2	Line 2 towards Nansihuan (Huijiquzhengfu) →
B1	Side platform, doors will open on the right
B1	South concourse	Customer service, Vending machines
B2		Connecting tunnel

== Exits ==
Exit	Indication	Destinations
A	Kaiyuan Lu (S)	
B	Kaiyuan Lu (S)	
C	Kaiyuan Lu (N)	
D	Kaiyuan Lu (N)	
