= Guanhutun station =

Metro station in Zhengzhou, China

Guanhutun 关虎屯
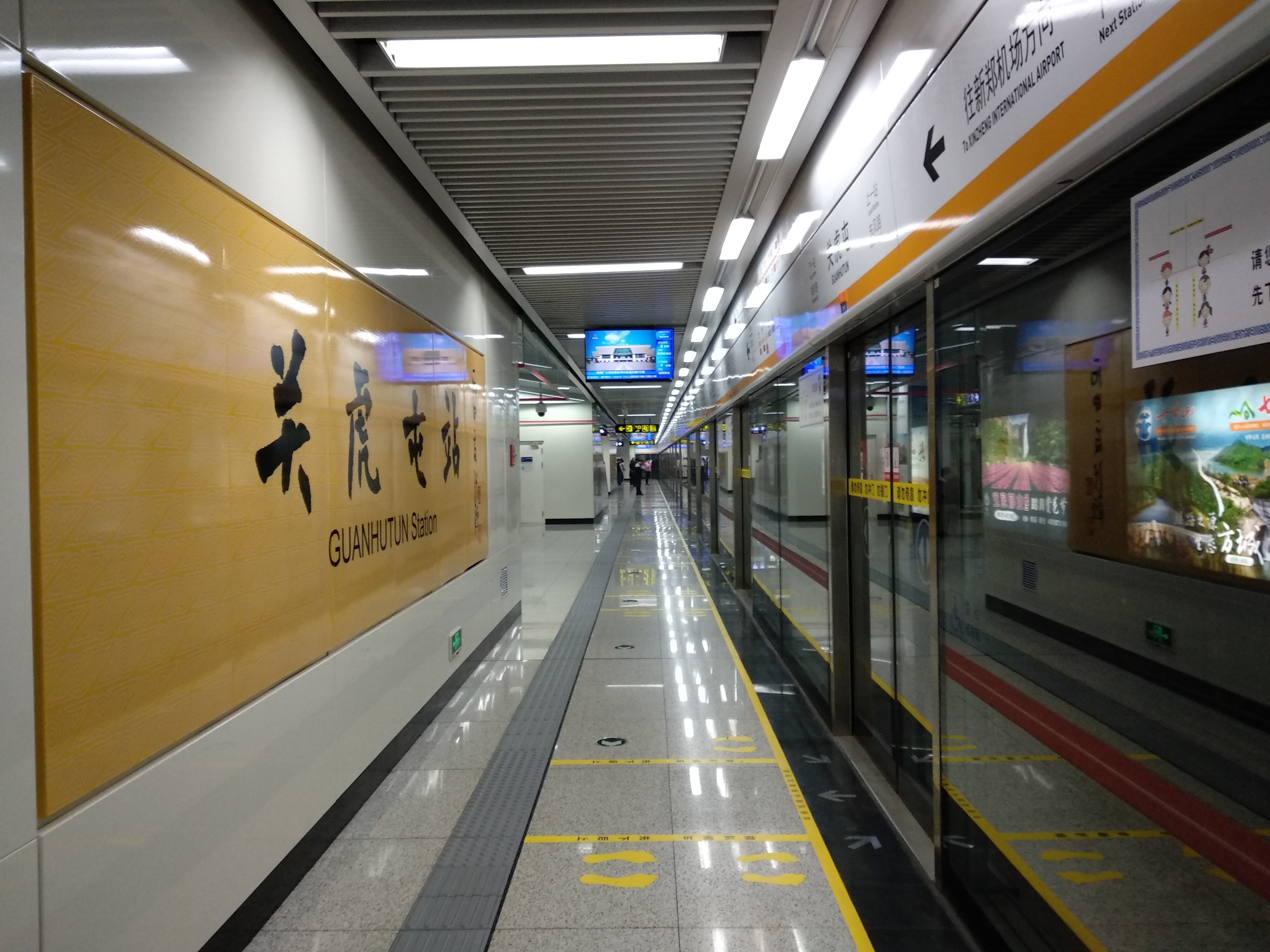

General information
- Location: To the north of Huayuan Road × Nongye Road; Jinshui District, Zhengzhou; China
- Coordinates: 34.7902°N 113.6756°E
- System: Zhengzhou Metro rapid transit station
- Operator: Zhengzhou Metro
- Line: Line 2
- Platforms: 2 (1 island platform)
- Connections: Bus; Zhengzhou BRT

Construction
- Structure type: Underground

Other information
- Station code: 226

History
- Opened: 19 August 2016

Services
Preceding station	Zhengzhou Metro	Following station
Dongfenglu towards Jiahe	Line 2	Huanghelu towards Zhengzhou Hangkonggang Railway Station
Location
- Location within Zhengzhou

Guanhutun (Chinese: 关虎屯) is a metro station of Zhengzhou Metro Line 2.

== Station layout ==
The 2-level underground station has a single island platform. The station concourse is on the B1 level and the B2 level is for the platforms.

G	-	Exits
B1	Concourse	Customer Service, Vending machines
B2; Platforms	Platform 2	← Line 2 towards Jiahe (Dongfenglu)
B2; Platforms	Island platform, doors will open on the left
B2; Platforms	Platform 1	Line 2 towards Nansihuan (Huanghelu) →

== Exits ==
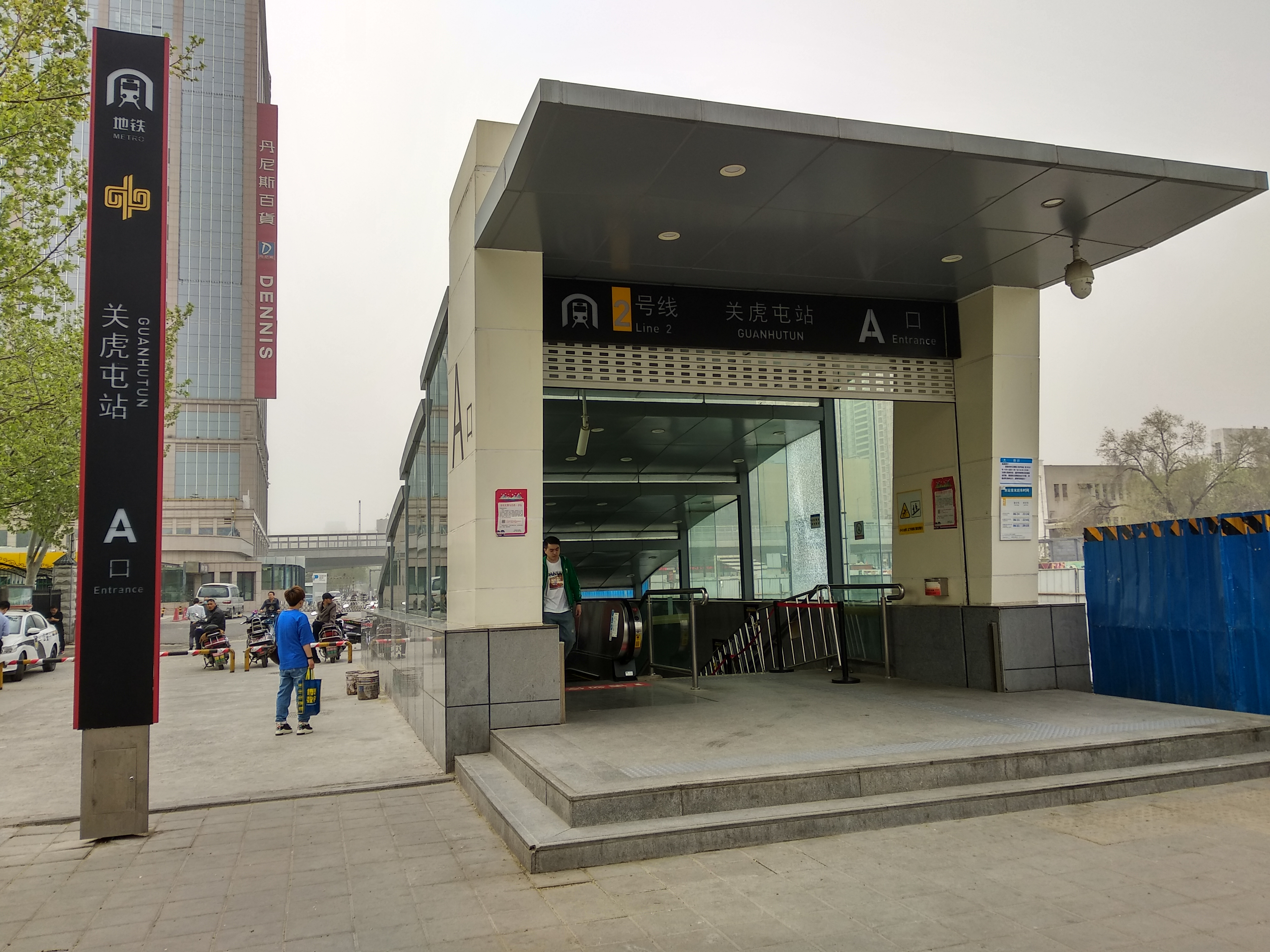
Exit of the station

Exit	Destination
Exit A	Zhengzhou Zoo, Huayuan Road (east side)
Exit C	Nongye road (north side), Huayuan Road (west side)
Exit G	Huayuan Road (west side)
Exit H	Huayuan Road (west side)

== Surrounding area ==
The station is located in the recent emerging Huayuan Road commercial zone and there are some major malls and department stores in the surrounding area.

Major destinations in the surrounding area of the station include:

- Zhengzhou Zoo
- Henan Agricultural Science Academy
- Guomao 360 Plaza
- Dashang New Mart Department Store (Huayuan Road Store)
- Dennis Department Store (Huayuan Road Store)
