= Grand Emporium =

- 正弘城
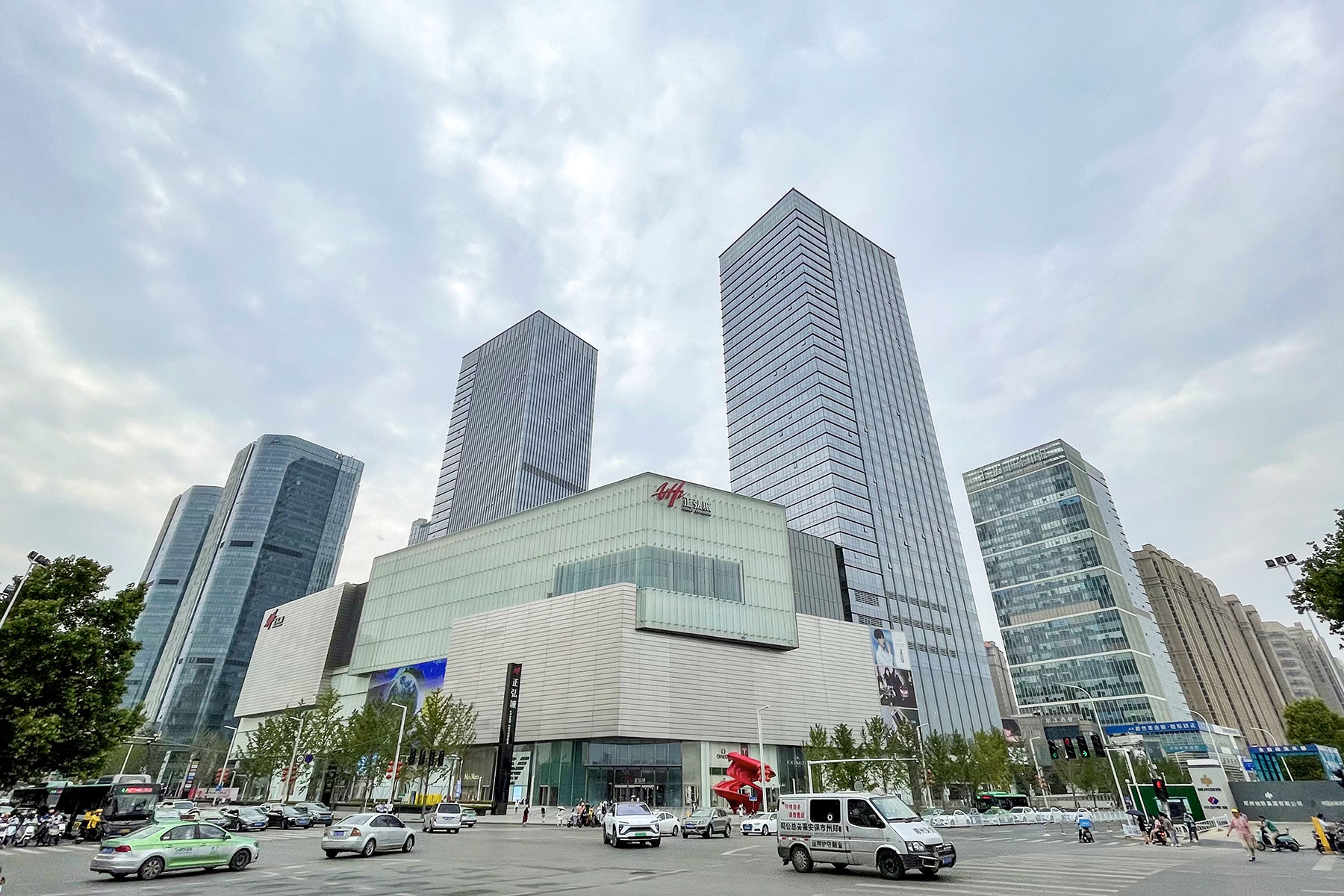
- Exterior of the Grand Emporium
- Interactive map of the Grand Emporium area

General information
- Type: Office, service apartments and shopping mall
- Location: Jinshui District, Zhengzhou, China
- Coordinates: 34.7969°N 113.6745°E
- Completed: 2018
- Opening: 7 December 2018

Height
- Roof: 185 m (607 ft)

Technical details
- Floor count: 39
- Floor area: 400,000 m^{2} (4,300,000 sq ft)

Design and construction
- Architect: CallisonRTKL
- Developer: Zhenghong Property

The Grand Emporium (Chinese: 正弘城) is a complex with two skyscrapers and a shopping mall in Jinshui District, Zhengzhou, China. The mall was opened on 7 December 2018.

== Features ==
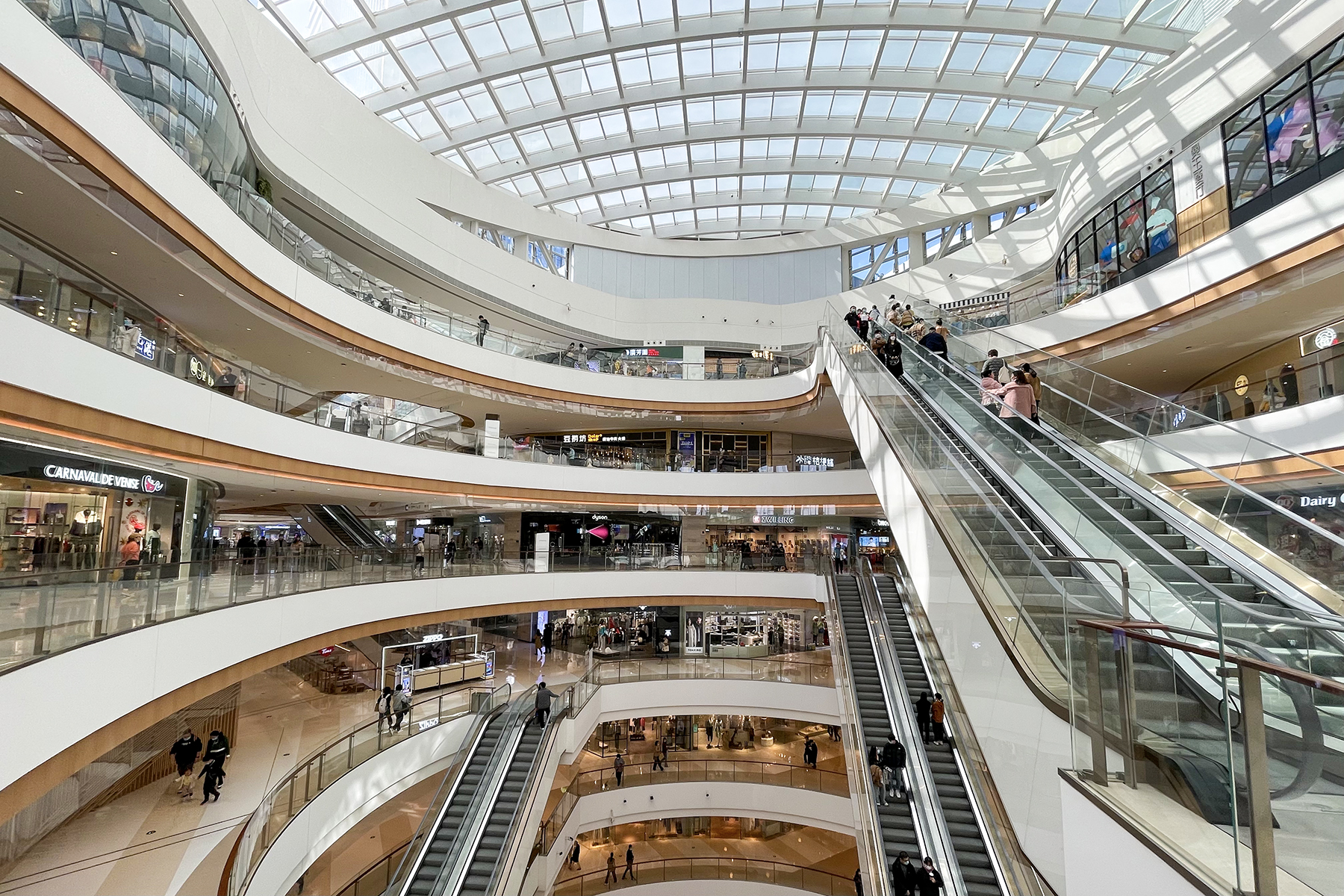
Interior of the Grand Emporium

The complex has two towers, both have a height of 185 m (607 ft) with 39 levels. The north tower serves as a service apartment, while the south tower (Zhenghong Center) is an office building. The mall is in the podium building.

There is a CGV cinema with an IMAX hall on the L6 level of the mall.

== Traffic ==
The complex is accessible from Dongfenglu station on Zhengzhou Metro Line 2 and Line 8.
