= Zijingshan station =

Metro station in Zhengzhou, China

Zijingshan 紫荆山
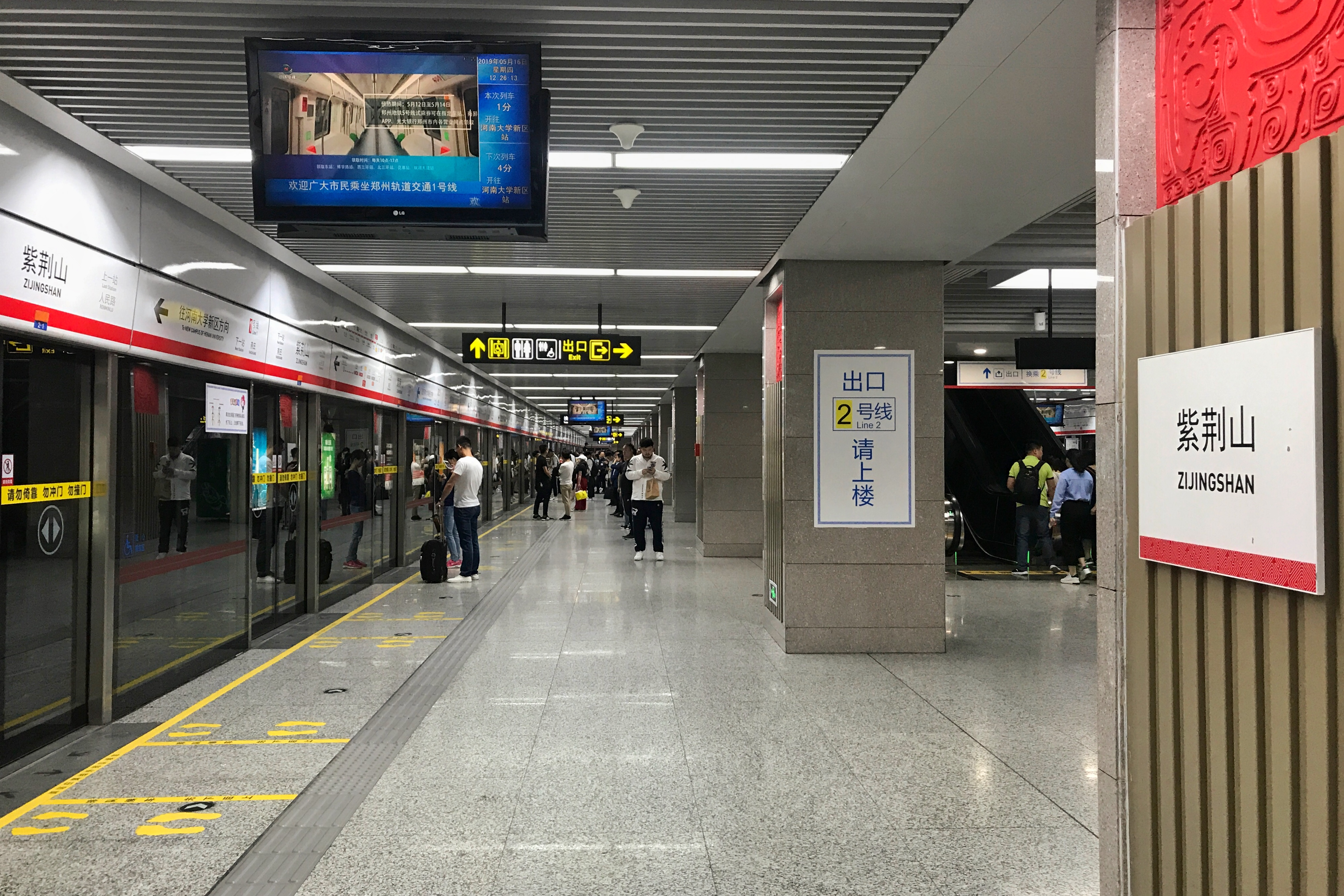
- The platforms of Line 1

General information
- Location: Zijingshan; Jinshui District, Zhengzhou; China
- Coordinates: 34.7632°N 113.6760°E
- System: Zhengzhou Metro rapid transit station
- Operator: Zhengzhou Metro
- Lines: Line 1; Line 2
- Platforms: 4 (2 island platforms)
- Connections: Bus

Construction
- Structure type: Underground

Other information
- Station code: 131 (Line 1); 228 (Line 2)

History
- Opened: 28 December 2013

Key dates
- 19 August 2016: Line 2 opened

Services
Preceding station	Zhengzhou Metro	Following station
Renminlu towards Henan University of Technology	Line 1	Yanzhuang towards New Campus of Henan University
Huanghelu towards Jiahe	Line 2	Dongdajie towards Zhengzhou Hangkonggang Railway Station
Location
- Location within Zhengzhou

Zijingshan (Chinese: 紫荆山) is a metro station of Zhengzhou Metro.

The station is an interchange station between Line 1 and Line 2. It became the first interchange station in Zhengzhou Metro system, with the opening of Line 2 on 19 August 2016.

== Station layout ==
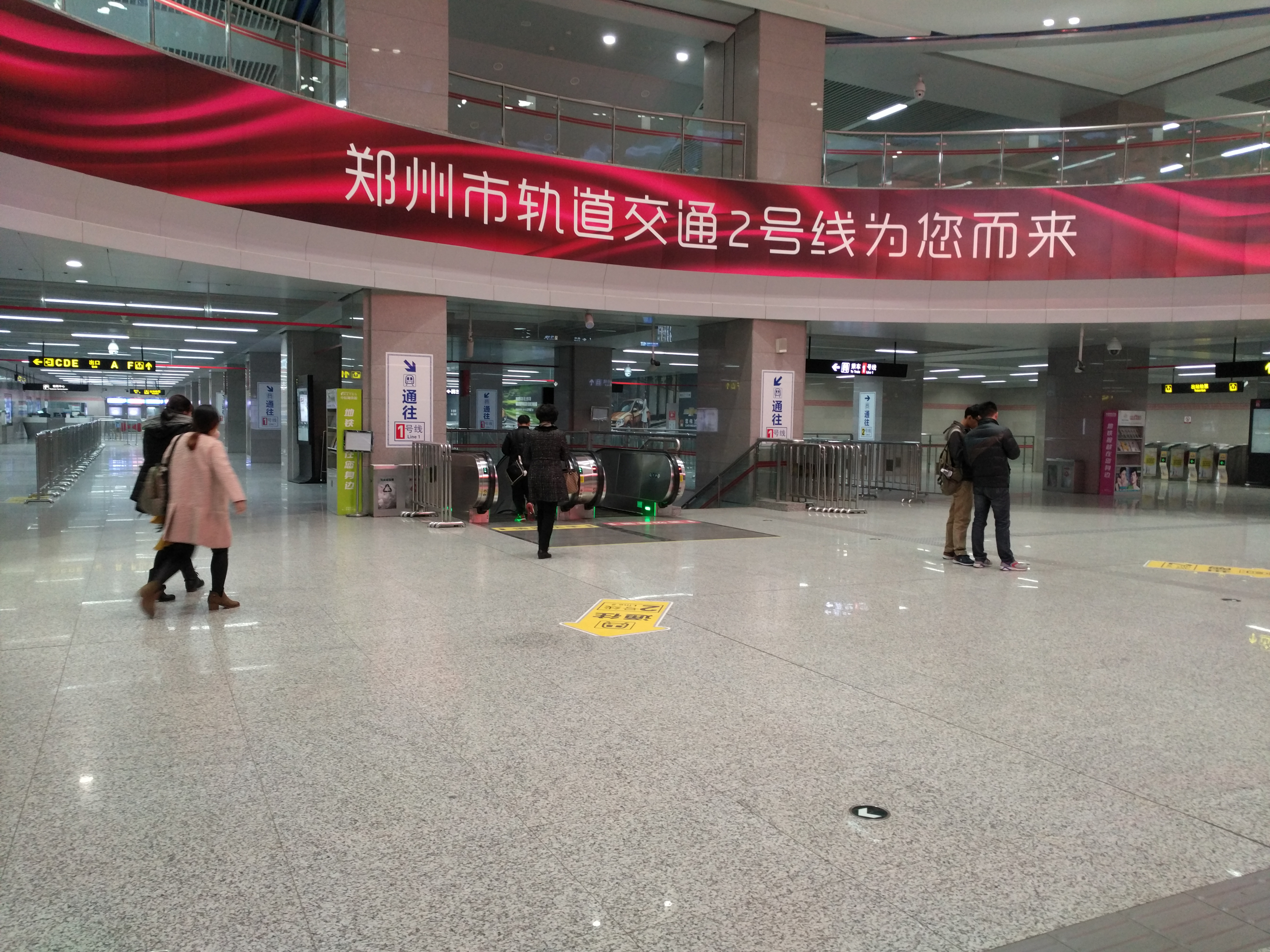
Concourse of the station

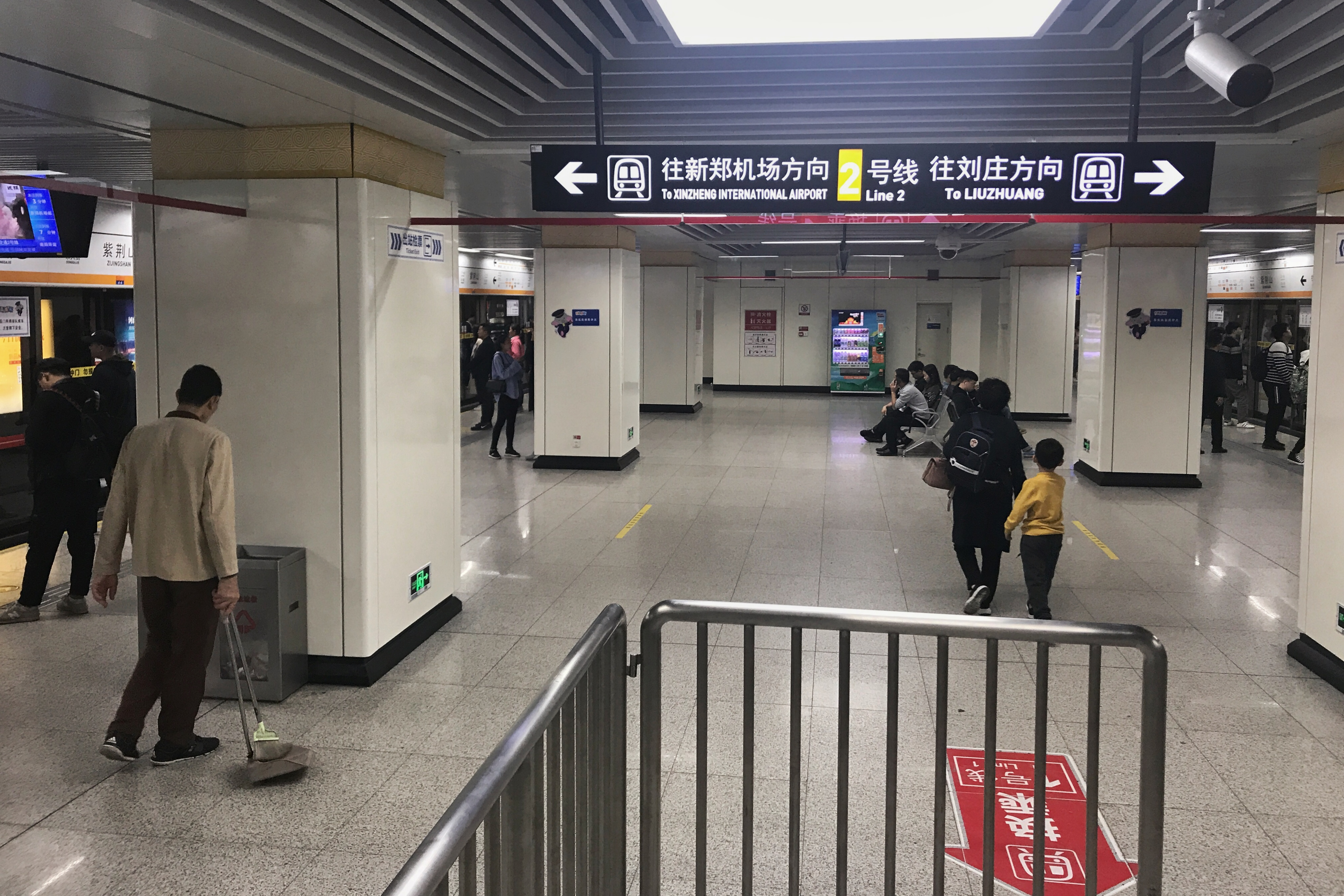
The platforms of Line 2

The station has 4 levels underground. The concourse is on the B2 level. The platforms for Line 1 and Line 2 are both island platforms. The B3 level is for the platforms of Line 1 and the B4 level is for the platforms of Line 2.

A staircase connecting the platforms on B3 and B4 levels is for passengers transferring from Line 2 to Line 1. Passengers transferring from Line 1 to Line 2 have to go up to the concourse first.

G	-	Exits
B2	Concourse	Customer Service, Vending machines, ATMs
B3; Platforms	Platform 2	← Line 1 towards Henan University of Technology (Renminlu)
B3; Platforms	Island platform, doors will open on the left
B3; Platforms	Platform 1	Line 1 towards New Campus of Henan University (Yanzhuang) →
B4; Platforms	Platform 3	← Line 2 towards Xinzheng International Airport (Dongdajie)
B4; Platforms	Island platform, doors will open on the left
B4; Platforms	Platform 4	Line 2 towards Jiahe (Huanghelu) →

== Exits ==
Exit	Destination	Bus connections
Exit A	Zijingshan Park	
Exit B (unopened)	Yellow River Museum	
Exit C	Zijingshan Road (east side)	27, 62, 86, 93, 199, 269, 603, 727, S166; Night services: Y16, Y29
Exit D	Renmin Road, Zijingshan Department Store	27, 40, 62, 86, 93, 199, 269, 603, 727, S166; Night services: Y16, Y29
Exit E	Zijingshan Interchange	9, 26, 32, 43, 37, 57, 82, 98, 100, 101, 109, 115, 122, 312, 312, 900, 903, 916, 919, S166; Night services: Y10, Y11, Y13, Y21, Y31
Exit F	Zijingshan Road (east side)	

== Surrounding area ==
- Zijingshan Park (紫荆山公园)
- Zijingshan Department Store (紫荆山百货大楼)
- People's Square (人民广场)
- Henan Hotel (河南饭店)
- Yellow River Conservancy Commission (黄河水利委员会)
- CPC Henan Provincial Committee (中共河南省委)
