= Liuzhuang station =

Metro station in Zhengzhou, China

Liuzhuang 刘庄
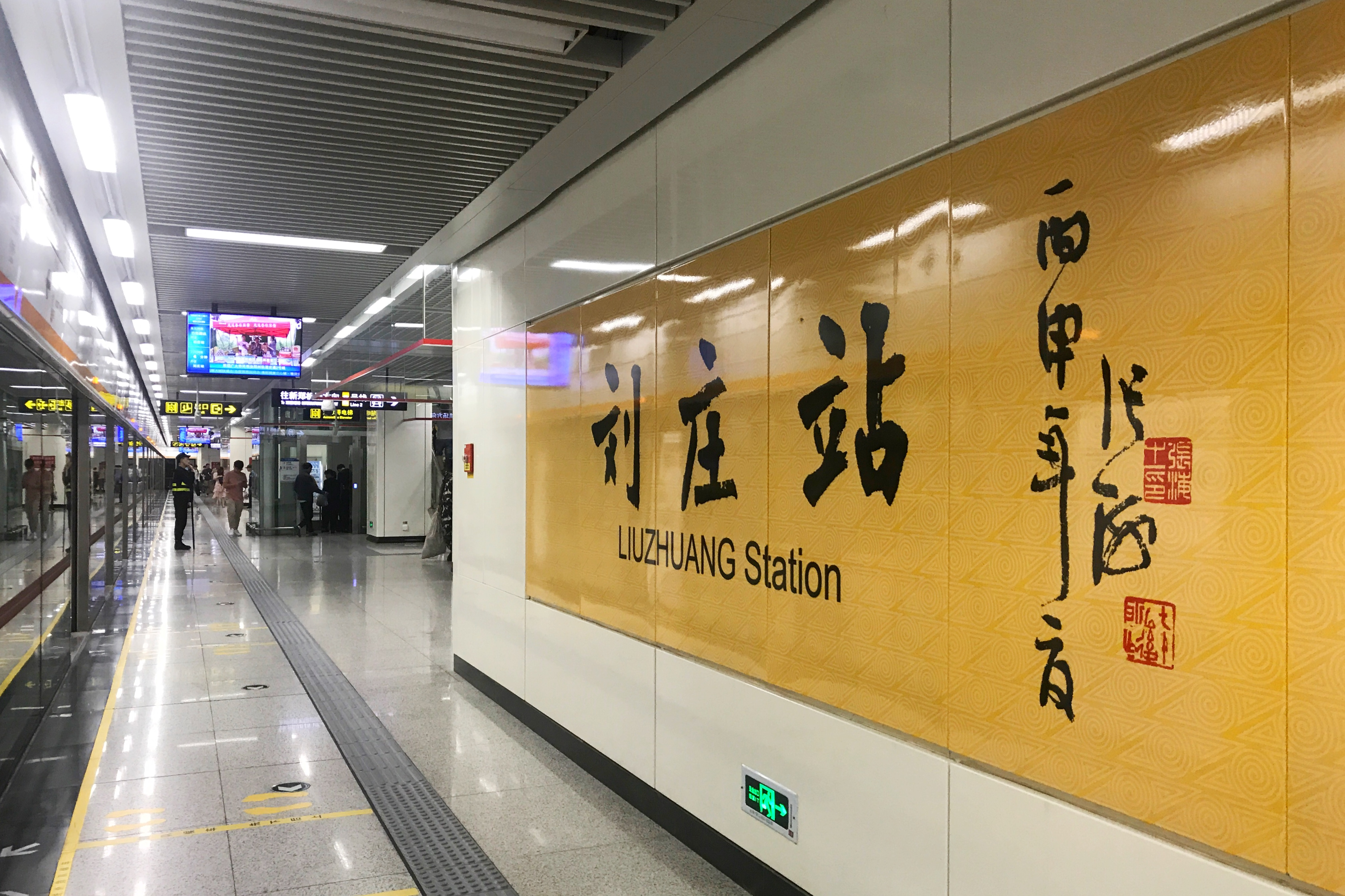

General information
- Location: To the south of Huayuan Road exit of G30 Expressway; Jinshui District, Zhengzhou; China
- Coordinates: 34.8445°N 113.6727°E
- System: Zhengzhou Metro rapid transit station
- Operator: Zhengzhou Metro
- Line: Line 2
- Platforms: 2 (1 island platform)
- Connections: Bus

Construction
- Structure type: Underground

Other information
- Station code: 221

History
- Opened: 19 August 2016

Services
| Preceding station | Zhengzhou Metro | Following station |
|---|---|---|
| Jindalu towards Jiahe | Line 2 | Liulin towards Zhengzhou Hangkonggang Railway Station |
Location
- Location within Zhengzhou

Liuzhuang (Chinese: 刘庄) is a metro station of Zhengzhou Metro Line 2.

== Station layout ==
The 2-level underground station has a single island platform. The station concourse is on the B1 level and the B2 level is for the platforms.

| G | - | Exits |
| B1 | Concourse | Customer service, Vending machines |
| B2; Platforms | Platform 2 | ← Line 2 towards Jiahe (Jindalu) |
| B2; Platforms | Island platform, doors will open on the left |
| B2; Platforms | Platform 1 | Line 2 towards Nansihuan (Liulin) → |

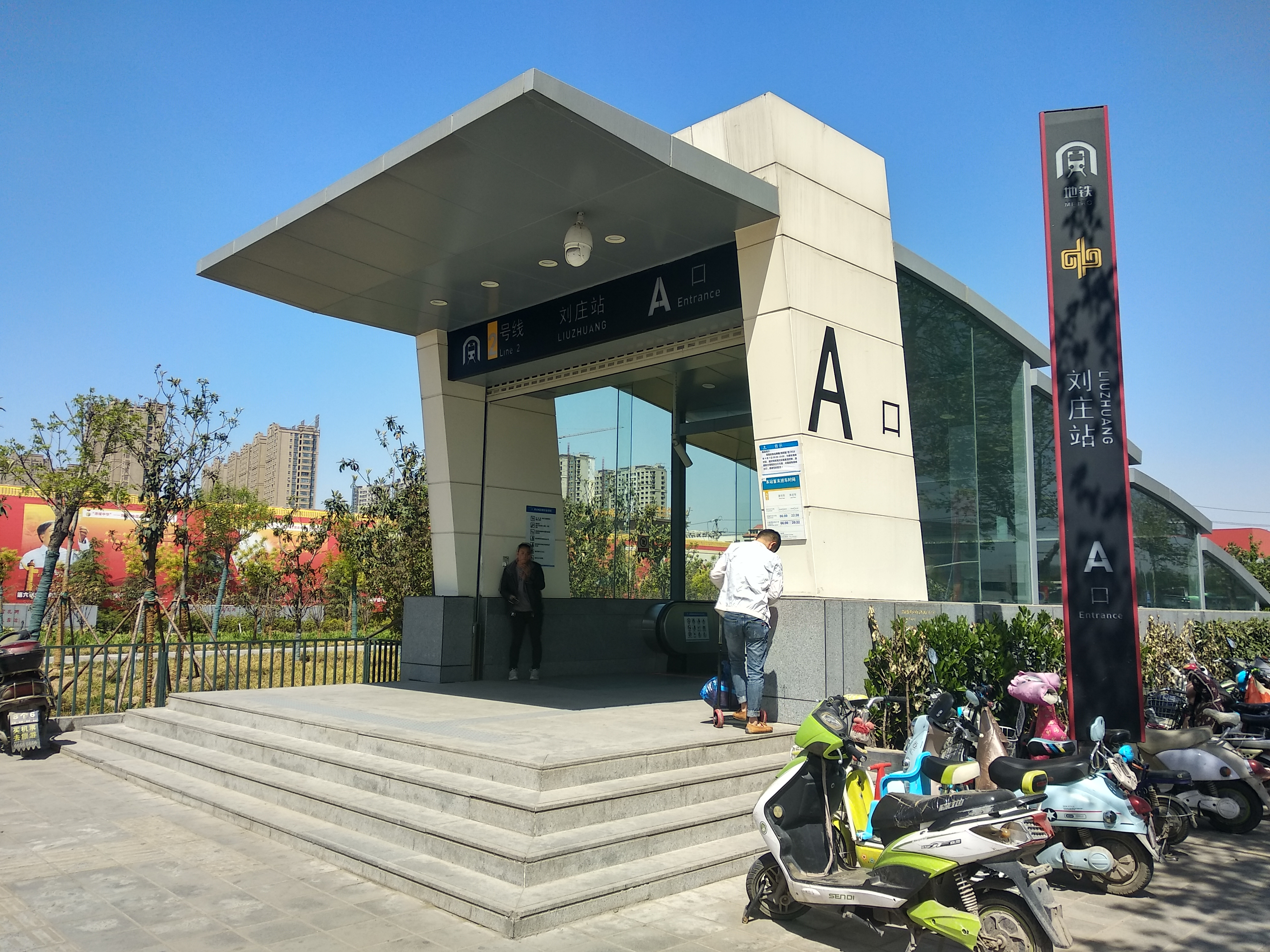
Exit A of the station

== Exits ==
| Exit | Destination |
|---|---|
| Exit A | Huayuan Road (west side) |
| Exit D1 | Huayuan Road (west side) |
| Exit D2 | Huayuan Road (east side), Zhengzhou North Coach Station |

== Surroundings ==
- Zhengzhou North Coach Station
