= Dashiqiao (disambiguation) =

Dashiqiao is a city in Liaoning, China.

Dashiqiao may also refer to:

- Dashiqiao Subdistrict, Zhengzhou, in Henan
- Dashiqiao Subdistrict, Meishan, in Dongpo District, Meishan, Sichuan
- Dashiqiao, Jianghua (大石桥乡), a township of Jianghua Yao Autonomous County, Hunan
- Anji Bridge, or Dashi Qiao, bridge in Hebei, China
