= Dongfenglu station =

Metro station in Zhengzhou, China

Dongfenglu 东风路
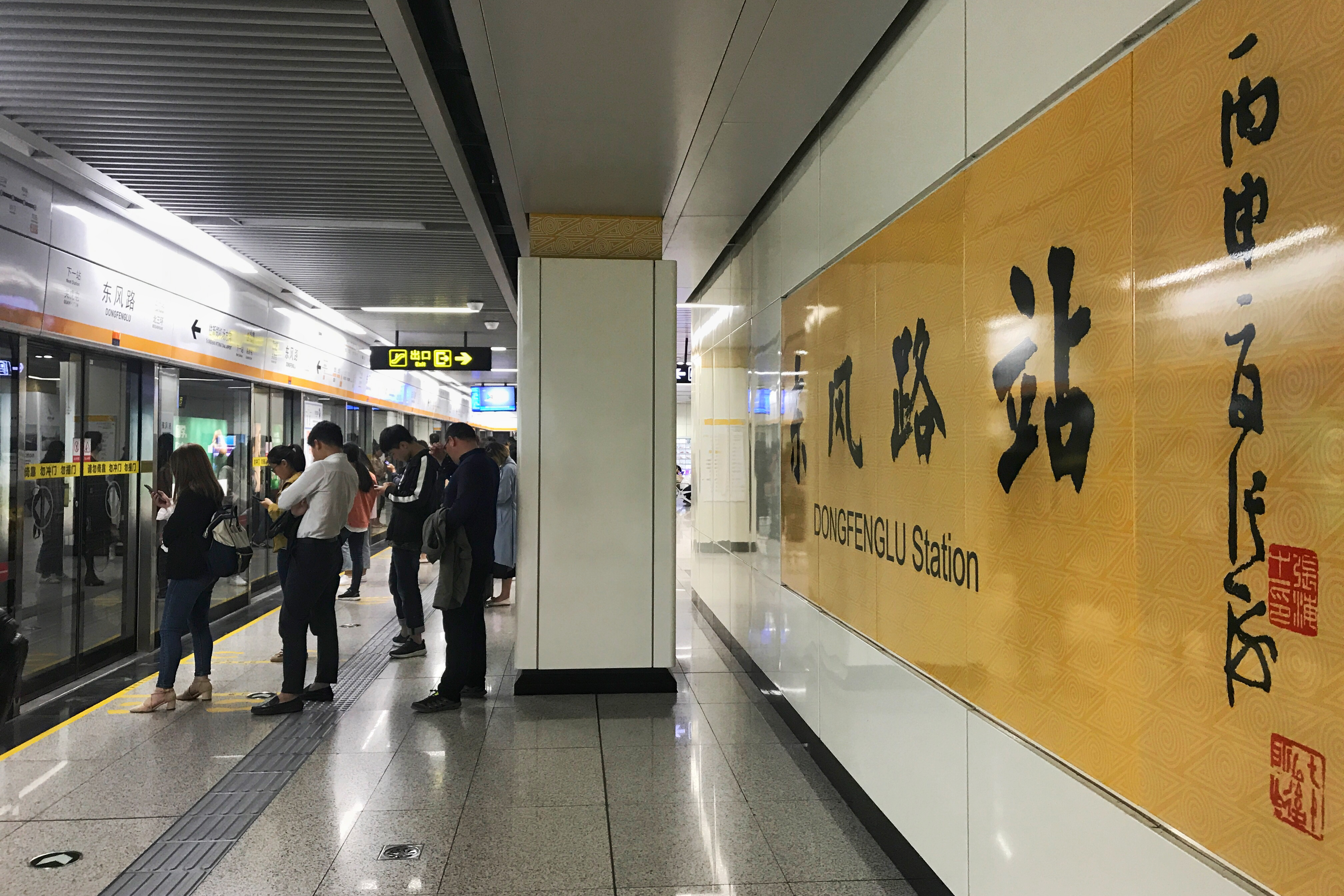
- Platforms of Line 2

General information
- Location: Huayuan Road × Dongfeng Road; Jinshui District, Zhengzhou; China
- Coordinates: 34.7970°N 113.6755°E
- System: Zhengzhou Metro rapid transit station
- Operator: Zhengzhou Metro
- Lines: Line 2; Line 8
- Platforms: 2 (1 island platform)
- Connections: Bus

Construction
- Structure type: Underground

Other information
- Station code: 225

History
- Opened: 19 August 2016

Services
Preceding station	Zhengzhou Metro	Following station
Beisanhuan towards Jiahe	Line 2	Guanhutun towards Zhengzhou Hangkonggang Railway Station
Baimiao towards Tianjianhu	Line 8	Zaozhuang towards Lumiao
Location
- Location within Zhengzhou

Dongfenglu (Chinese: 东风路) is a metro station of Zhengzhou Metro Line 2 and Line 8.

== Station layout ==
The 2-level underground station has a single island platform. The station concourse is on the B1 level and the B2 level is for the platforms.

G	-	Exits
B1	Concourse	Customer Service, Vending machines
B2; Platforms	Platform 2	← Line 2 towards Jiahe (Beisanhuan)
B2; Platforms	Island platform, doors will open on the left
B2; Platforms	Platform 1	Line 2 towards Nansihuan (Guanhutun) →

== Exits ==
Exit	Destination
Exit A	Huayuan Road (east side)
Exit D	Dongfeng road (south side), Huayuan Road (west side)

== Surroundings ==
- Grand Emporium
- Dongfeng Canal Park
- Digital Park
