= Beisanhuan station =

Metro station in Zhengzhou, China

Beisanhuan 北三环
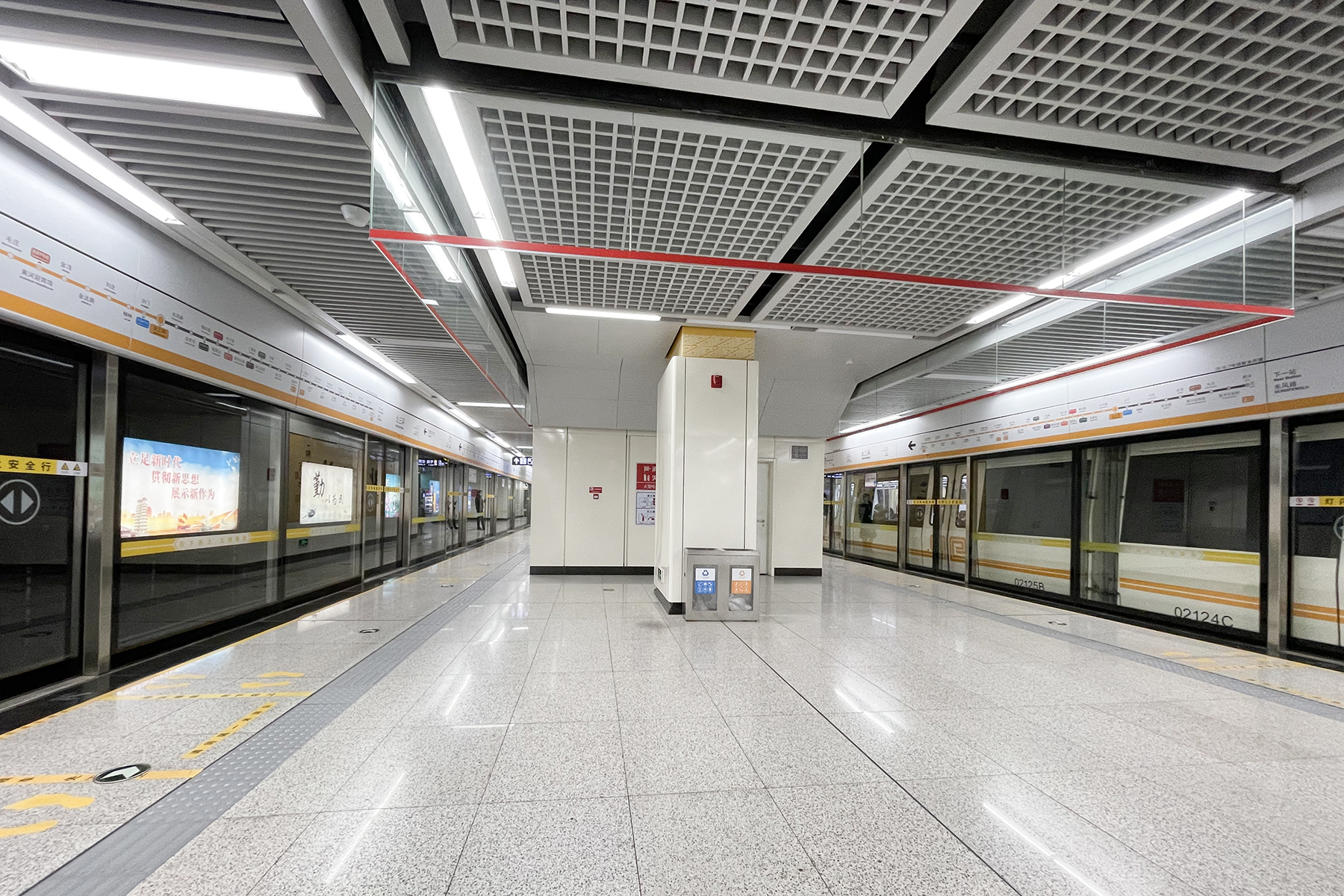

General information
- Location: Huayuan Road × Guangdian South Road; Jinshui District, Zhengzhou; China
- Coordinates: 34.8060°N 113.6754°E
- System: Zhengzhou Metro rapid transit station
- Operator: Zhengzhou Metro
- Line: Line 2
- Platforms: 2 (1 island platform)
- Connections: Bus

Construction
- Structure type: Underground

Other information
- Station code: 224

History
- Opened: 19 August 2016

Services
Preceding station	Zhengzhou Metro	Following station
Shamen towards Jiahe	Line 2	Dongfenglu towards Zhengzhou Hangkonggang Railway Station
Location
- Location within Zhengzhou

Beisanhuan (Chinese: 北三环) is a metro station of Zhengzhou Metro Line 2.

The name of the station is after the North 3rd Ring Road (pinyin: Běi Sān Huán). However, the station is hundreds of meters south to the road. The transfer to Zhengzhou BRT on the North 3rd Ring Road from this station is not convenient.

== Station layout ==
The 2-level underground station has a single island platform. The station concourse is on the B1 level and the B2 level is for the platforms.

G	-	Exits
B1	Concourse	Customer Service, Vending machines
B2; Platforms	Platform 2	← Line 2 towards Jiahe (Shamen)
B2; Platforms	Island platform, doors will open on the left
B2; Platforms	Platform 1	Line 2 towards Nansihuan (Dongfenglu) →

== Exits ==
Exit	Destination
Exit A	Huayuan Road (east side)
Exit B	Huayuan Road (west side)
Exit C	Huayuan Road (west side)

== Surroundings ==
- Henan Television Station
