= Huanghelu station =

Metro station in Zhengzhou, China

Huanghelu 黄河路
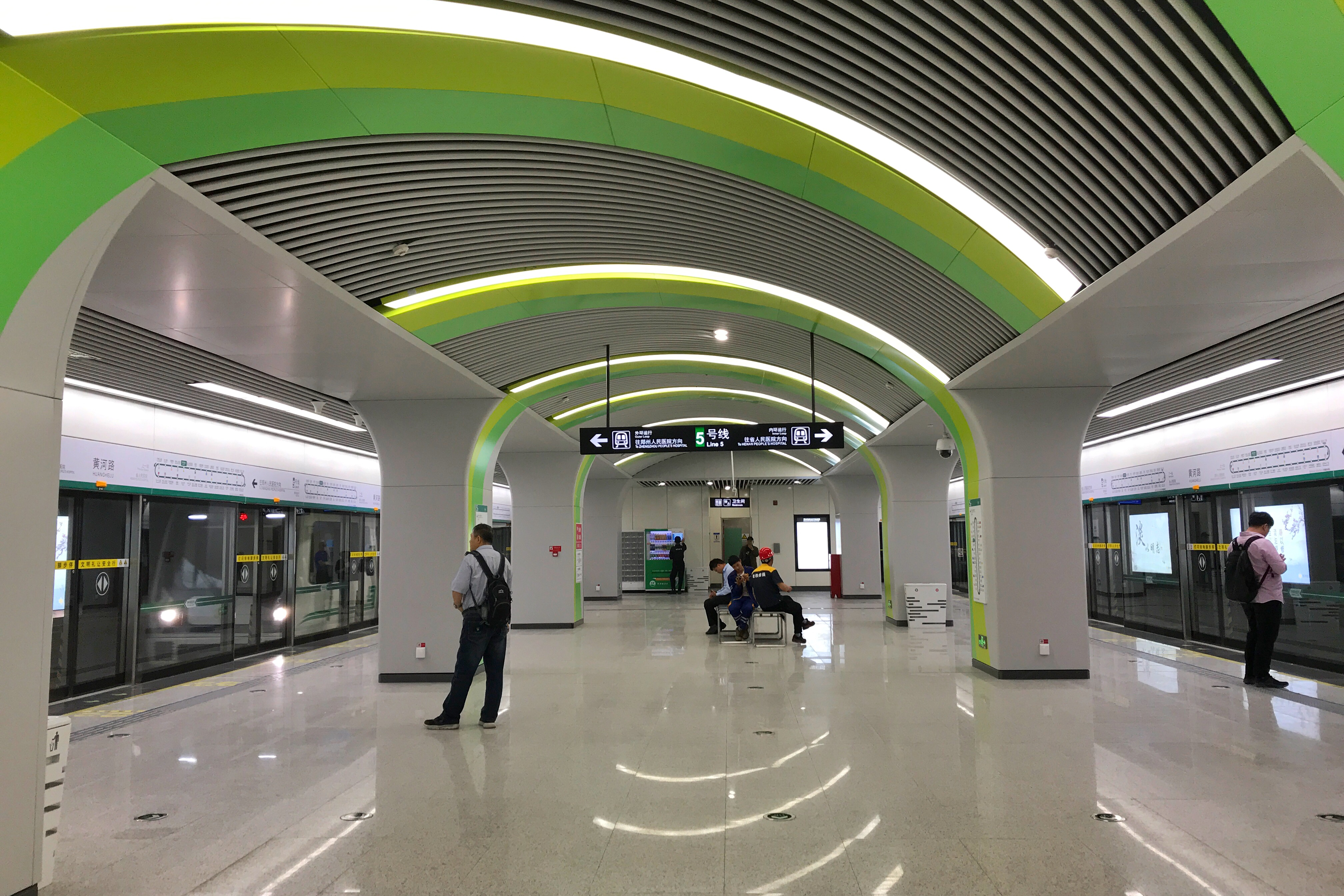
- Platform of Line 5

General information
- Location: Huayuan Road × Huanghe Road; Jinshui District, Zhengzhou; China
- Coordinates: 34.7756°N 113.6760°E
- System: Zhengzhou Metro rapid transit station
- Operator: Zhengzhou Metro
- Lines: Line 2; Line 5
- Platforms: 4 (2 island platforms)
- Connections: Bus

Construction
- Structure type: Underground

Other information
- Station code: 227

History
- Opened: 19 August 2016

Services
Preceding station	Zhengzhou Metro	Following station
Guanhutun towards Jiahe	Line 2	Zijingshan towards Zhengzhou Hangkonggang Railway Station
Henan People's Hospital inner loop	Line 5	Zhengzhou People's Hospital outer loop
Location
- Location within Zhengzhou

Huanghelu (Chinese: 黄河路) is a metro station of Zhengzhou Metro. This station is an interchange station between Line 2 and Line 5 after Line 5 started operation on 20 May 2019.

Interchange stations of Line 5 are decorated with themes of prefecture-level cities in Henan province. The station is the Anyang themed station, having a mural at the concourse of Line 5 featuring the Chinese characters theme.

== Station layout ==
The station is located beneath the crossing of Huayuan Road and Huanghe Road. It has three levels underground. The B1 level is for the concourse. The island platform for Line 5 is on the B2 level and the island platform for Line 2 is on the B3 level.

G	-	Exits
-1F	Concourse	Customer Service, Vending machines
-2F; Platforms		← Line 5 outer loop (Zhengzhou People's Hospital)
-2F; Platforms	Island platform, doors will open on the left
-2F; Platforms		Line 5 inner loop (Henan People's Hospital) →
-3F; Platforms		← Line 2 towards Jiahe (Guanhutun)
-3F; Platforms	Island platform, doors will open on the left
-3F; Platforms		Line 2 towards Nansihuan (Zijingshan) →

== Exits ==
The station currently has 3 exits open.

Exit	Sign	Destination	Bus connections
A	Huayuan Lu (E)	Financial Plaza	
D	Huayuan Lu (E)	Henan Food Bureau	9, 29, 32, 42, 47, 62, 93, 900, K9, B32; Night services: Y11, Y27
F	Huanghe Lu (E)	China Unicom Henan Branch	47, 903, S159

== Gallery ==
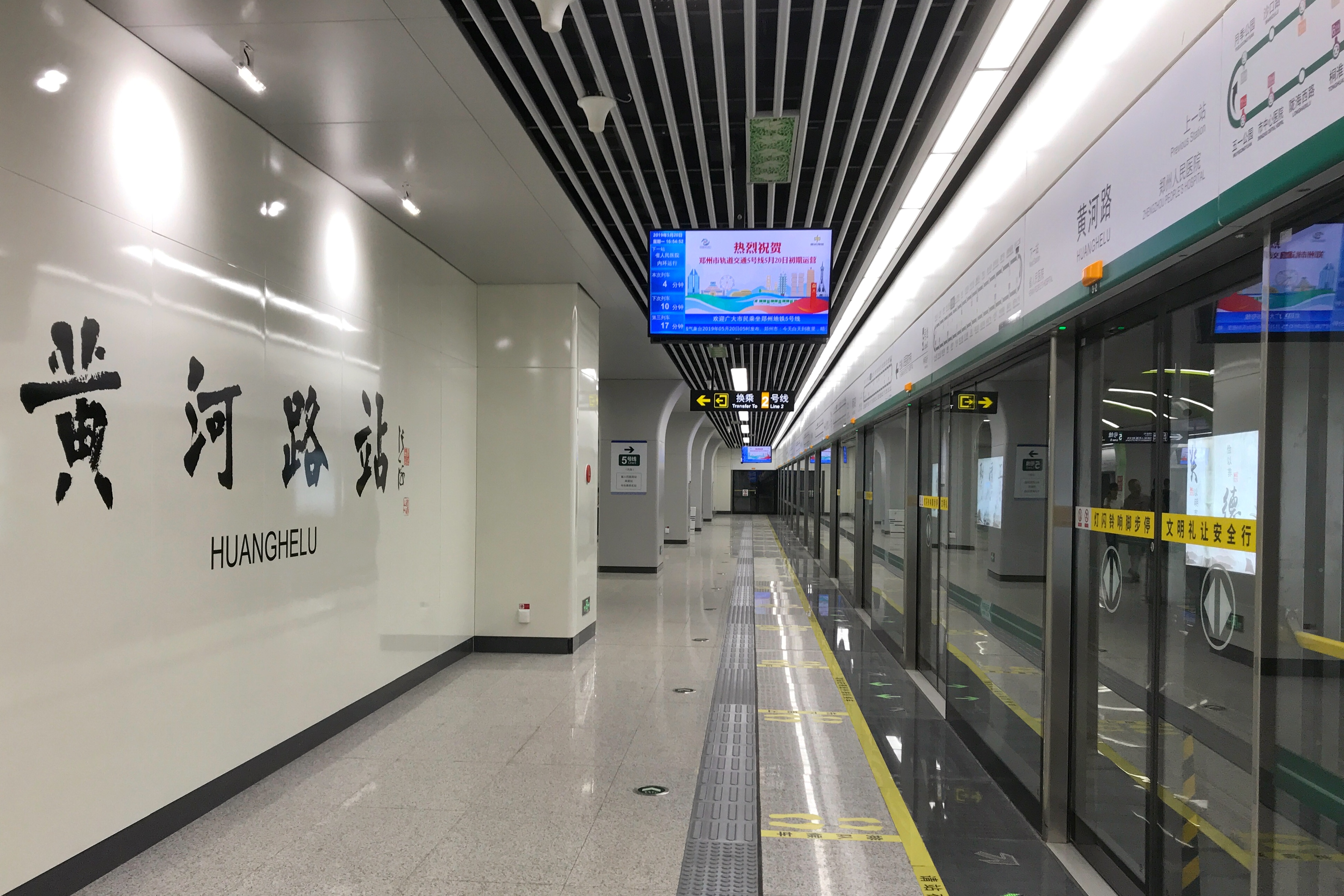
The platform of Line 5

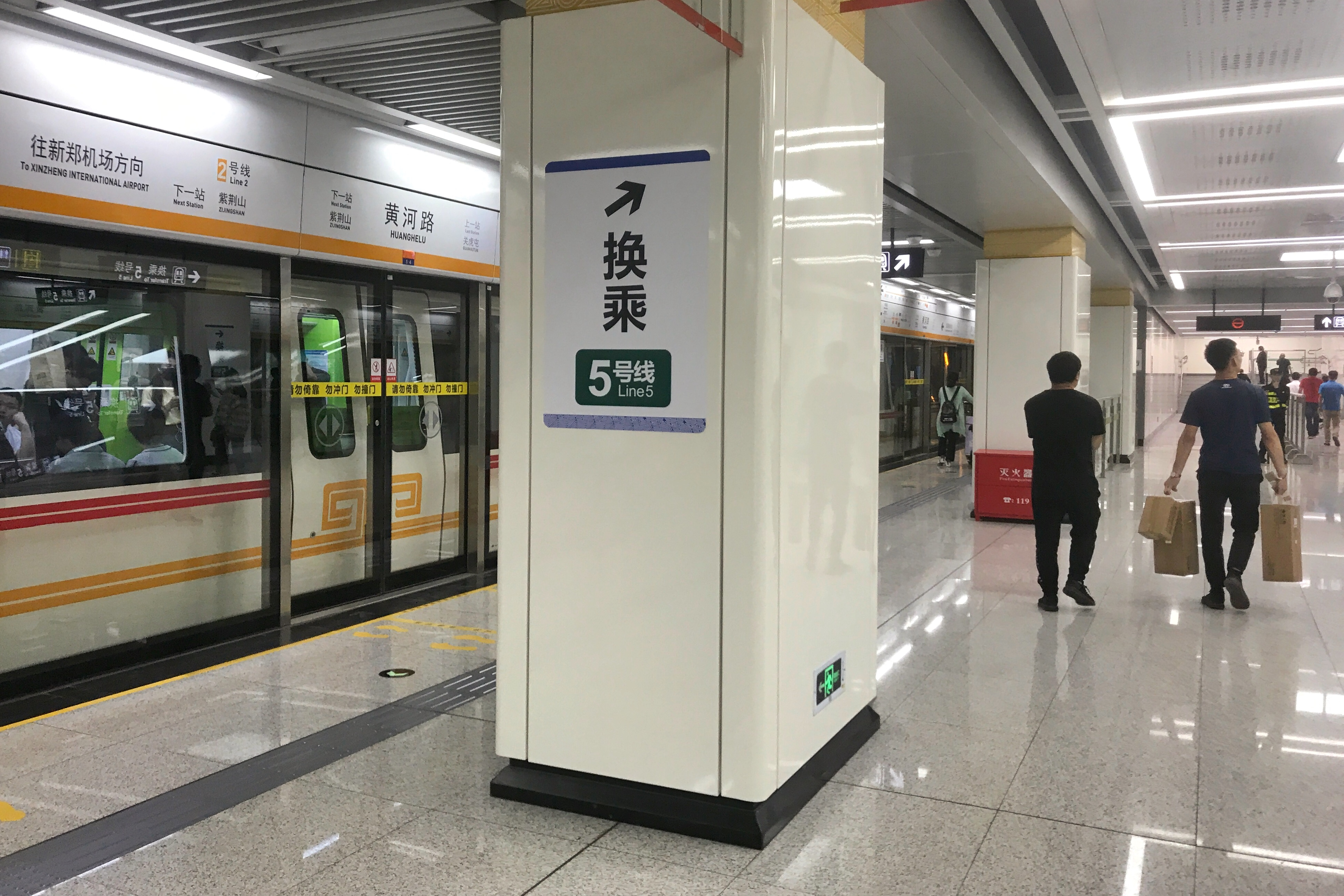
The platform of Line 2

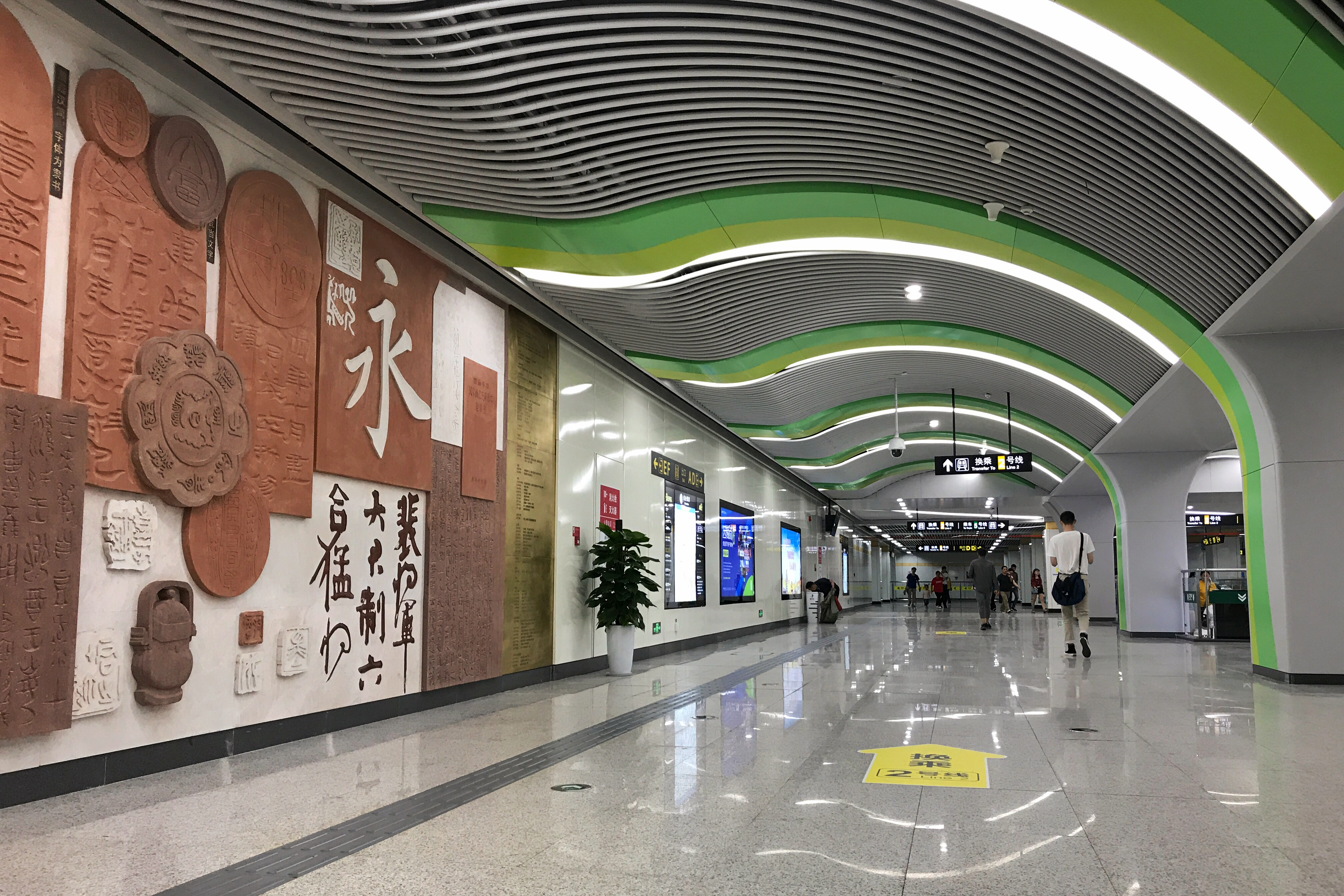
The concourse of Line 5

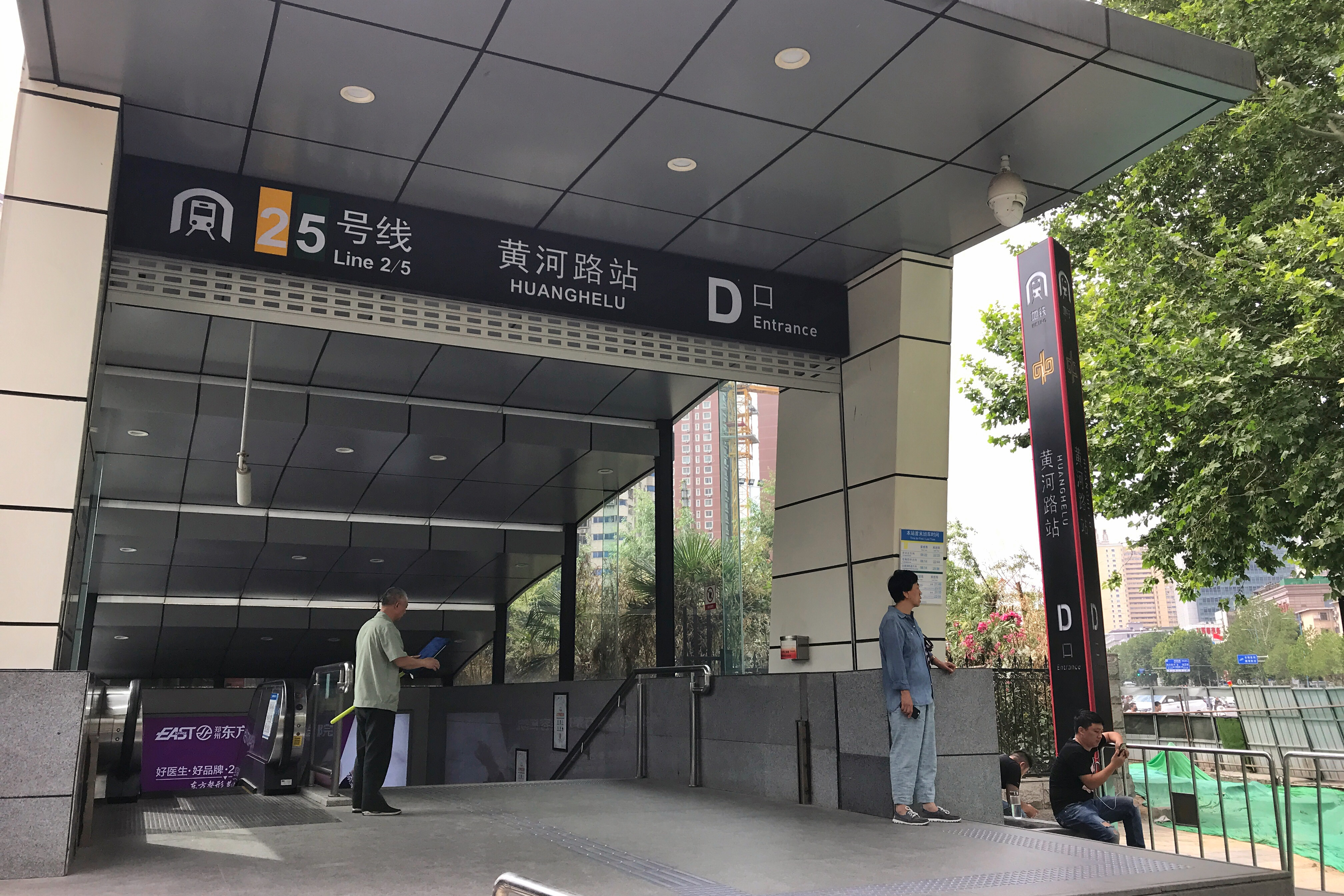
The Entrance D
