= Renminlu station (Zhengzhou Metro) =

Metro station in Zhengzhou, China

Renminlu 人民路
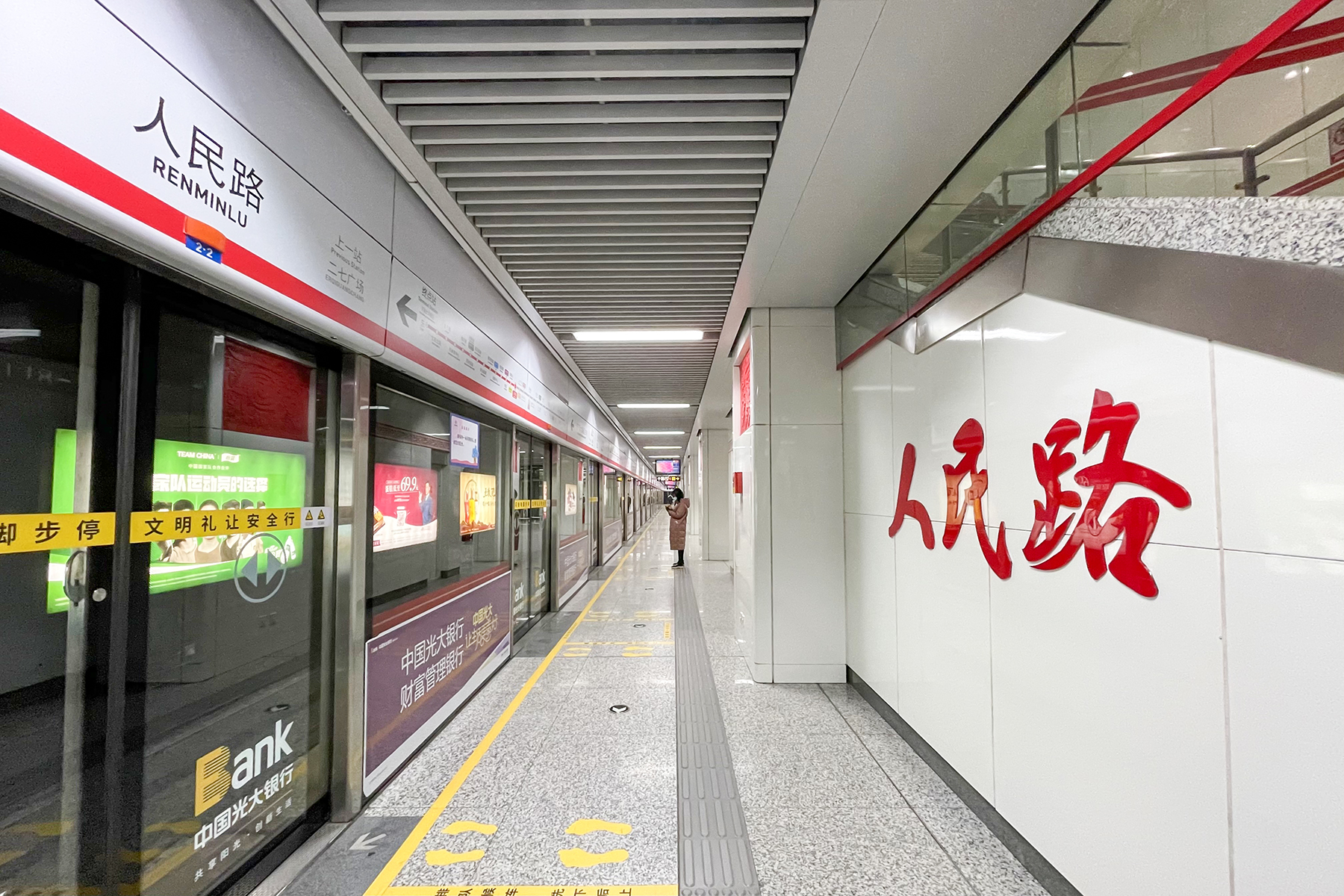

General information
- Location: Renmin Road; Zhengzhou; China
- Coordinates: 34.7587°N 113.6680°E
- System: Zhengzhou Metro rapid transit station
- Operator: Zhengzhou Metro
- Line: Line 1
- Platforms: 2 (1 island platform)
- Connections: Bus

Construction
- Structure type: Underground

Other information
- Station code: 130

History
- Opened: 28 December 2013

Services
Preceding station	Zhengzhou Metro	Following station
Erqiguangchang towards Henan University of Technology	Line 1	Zijingshan towards New Campus of Henan University
Location
- Location within Zhengzhou

Renminlu (Chinese: 人民路) is a metro station of Zhengzhou Metro Line 1.

The station lies beneath Renmin Road, between Duling Street and Xili Street.

== Station layout ==
The station has 3 floors underground. The B1 floor is the station concourse and the B2 floor is for equipments. The B3 floor is for platforms and tracks. The station has one island platform and two tracks for Line 1.

G	-	Exit
B1	Concourse	Customer Service, Vending machines
B2		Staff only
B3; Platforms	Platform 2	← Line 1 towards Henan University of Technology (Erqiguangchang)
B3; Platforms	Island platform, doors will open on the left
B3; Platforms	Platform 1	Line 1 towards New Campus of Henan University (Zijingshan) →

== Exits ==
Exit	Destination	Bus connections
Exit A	The 1st Affiliated Hospital of HUTCM	9, 32, 37, 57, 82, 98, 100, 101, 109, 312, 900, 903; Night services: Y10, Y11, Y21
Exit B	Guancheng Houjie, Dennis Department Store (Renmin Store)	9, 57, 82, 101, 312, 900, 903
Exit C	Renmin Road (southeast side)	K9, 26
Exit D	Renmin Road (northwest side)	K9, 26, 32, 37, 98, 109; Night services: Y10, Y11, Y21

== Surroundings ==
- Dennis Department Store (Renmin Store) (丹尼斯百货人民店)
- The 1st Affiliated Hospital of HUTCM (河南中医药大学第一附属医院)
- Zhongyuan Book Building (中原图书大厦)
- Xinhua Jianguo Hotel (新华建国饭店)
- Grand Shanghai City Mall (大上海城)
- Shangcheng Park (商城公园)
