= Zhongyuan Bank =

Commercial bank in China

- Company type: public; limited liability
- Traded as: SEHK: 1216
- Industry: Financial services
- Founded: December 23, 2014
- Headquarters: Zhongke Jinzuo, Zhengzhou, China
- Area served: Henan
- Key people: Guo Hao (Chairman), Wang Jiong (President)
- Number of employees: 13,000

Zhongyuan Bank is a commercial bank in mainland China that provides financial services. The bank provides services including personal banking, corporate banking, microloans, wealth management and internet banking.

It was founded on December 23, 2014, in Zhengzhou, Henan. According to Forbes, as of 2022 it had a market cap of US$2.8 billion and US$5 billion in sales.

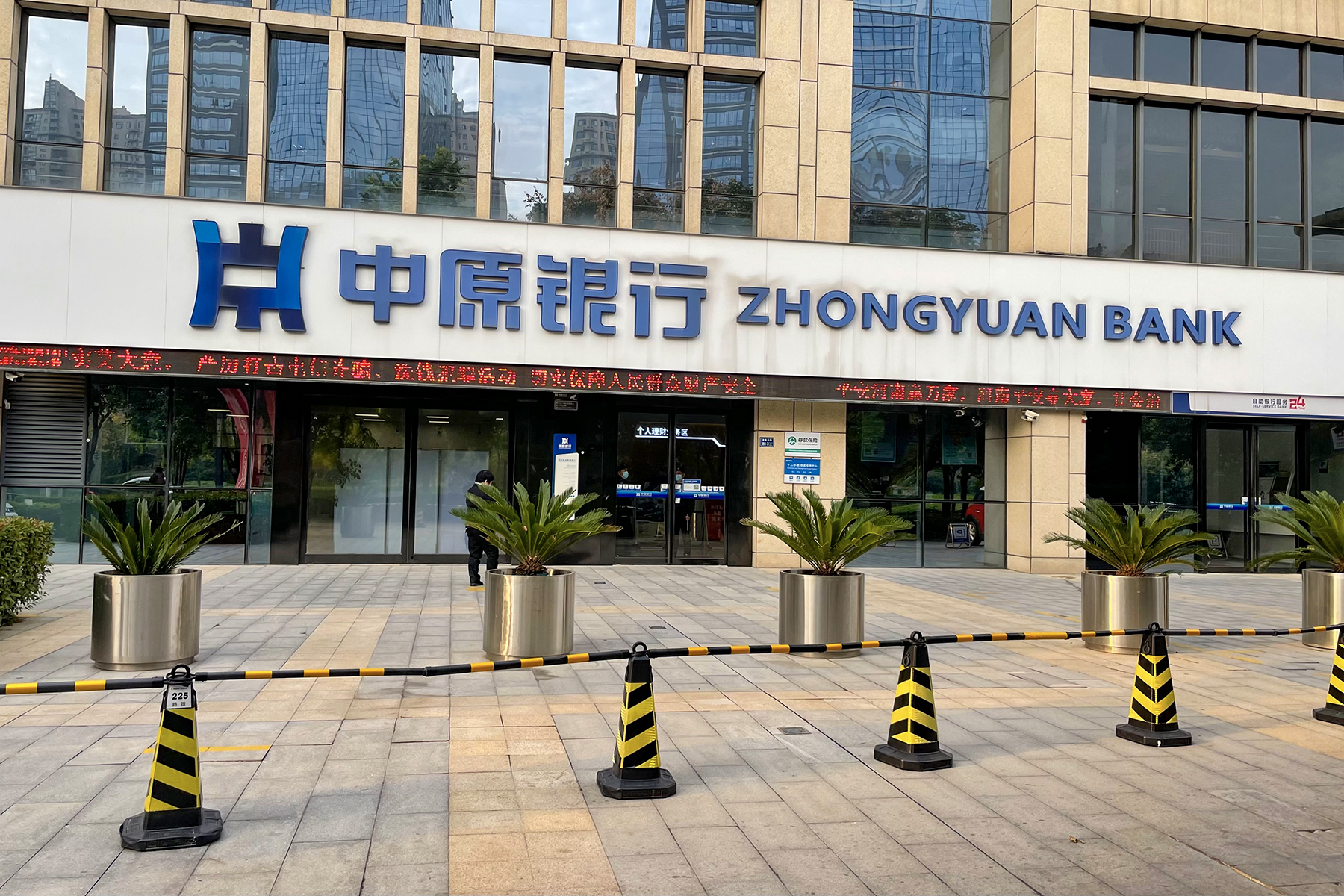
Jinshui E. Road branch of Zhongyuan Bank

== History ==
Zhongyuan Bank was created in 2014 from the merger of 13 smaller banks in Henan.

According to the bank's website, the bank hosted study events for its staff in communist party history as well as ideology in 2021 and celebrated the Chinese Communist Party's 100-year anniversary.

In 2021, in answer to a government push for smaller banks to consolidate in order to contain risks in the financial system, Zhongyuan announced that it would merge with three other banks, including Bank of Luoyang, Bank of Pingdingshan and Bank of Jiaozuo China Travel Services Co. The Bank of Luoyang was one of a number of banks that had financed China Evergrande Group, a large mainland China real estate developer that ran into serious financial difficulties in late 2021.

In August 2022, Liu Kaisheng took over the role of vice-president and Wang Jiong took over the role as president.

In September 2022, Nikkei Asia reported that Zhongyuan Bank was being exposed to large unpaid real estate loans and that in June 2022 it had the fourth highest nonperforming loan ratio in the real estate sector among Chinese banks.

In September 2022, it was reported that real estate enterprise shareholders in Zhongyuan Bank as well as two other institutions had loaned over 600 million yuan to Furen Pharmaceuticals, and Furen was having difficulties paying this back.

== Other ==
The Chief Economist of Zhongyuan Bank, Wang Jun, made remarks published in the BBC in April 2022 about China's economic outlook. He said that China's economic growth in 2022 was falling short of the growth goal of 5.5% that had been set by the government. He said that economic growth in the second quarter of 2022 would be under great pressure, and that whether or not economic strength could be maintained was reliant upon how flexible China would be with its pandemic measures as well as policy supports for the economy.

Wang Jun made further remarks about China's economic issues which were quoted by the Guardian in August: "We are now facing a typical liquidity trap problem. No matter how loose the credit supply is, companies and consumers are cautious in taking on more debt,...Some of them are now even paying back their debt in advance. This may herald a recession."
