= Liulin station =

Metro station in Zhengzhou, China

Liulin 柳林
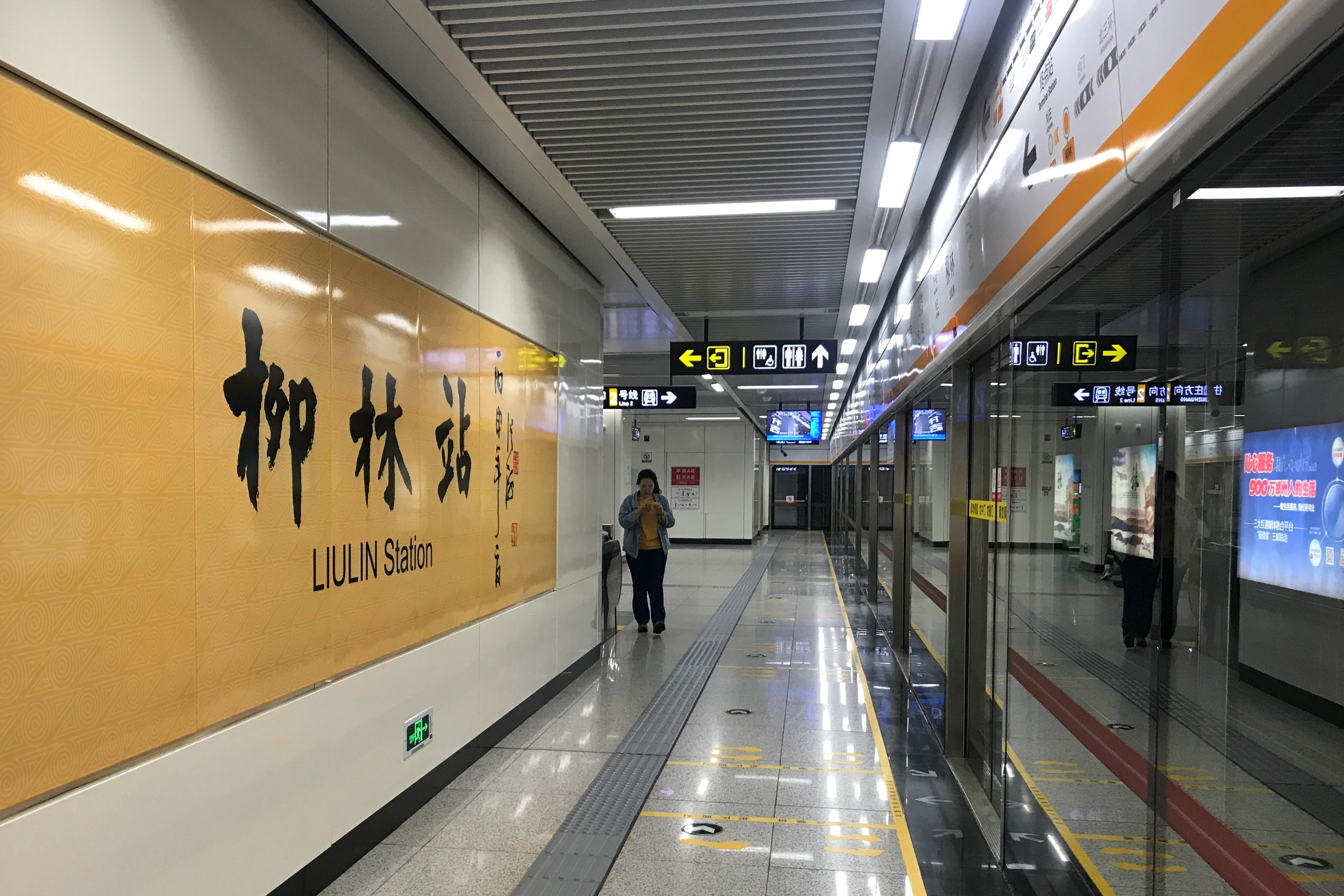
- Platform of the station

General information
- Location: Huayuan N. Road × Sanquan Road; Jinshui District, Zhengzhou; China
- Coordinates: 34.8295°N 113.6751°E
- System: Zhengzhou Metro rapid transit station
- Operator: Zhengzhou Metro
- Line: Line 2
- Platforms: 2 (1 island platform)
- Connections: Bus

Construction
- Structure type: Underground

Other information
- Station code: 222

History
- Opened: 19 August 2016

Services
Preceding station	Zhengzhou Metro	Following station
Liuzhuang towards Jiahe	Line 2	Shamen towards Zhengzhou Hangkonggang Railway Station
Location
- Location within Zhengzhou

Liulin (Chinese: 柳林) is a metro station of Zhengzhou Metro Line 2.

== Station layout ==
The 2-level underground station has a single island platform. The station concourse is on the B1 level and the B2 level is for the platforms.

G	-	Exits
-1F	Concourse	Customer service, Vending machines
-2F; Platforms	Platform 2	← Line 2 towards Jiahe (Liuzhuang)
-2F; Platforms	Island platform, doors will open on the left
-2F; Platforms	Platform 1	→ Line 2 towards Nansihuan (Shamen) →

== Exits ==
Exit	Destination
Exit A	Sanquan Road (south side), Huayuan Road (east side)
Exit B	Sanquan Road (south side), Huayuan Road (west side)
Exit C	Sanquan Road (north side), Huayuan Road (west side)
Exit D	Sanquan Road (north side), Huayuan Road (east side)
