= Shamen station =

Metro station in Zhengzhou, China

Shamen 沙门
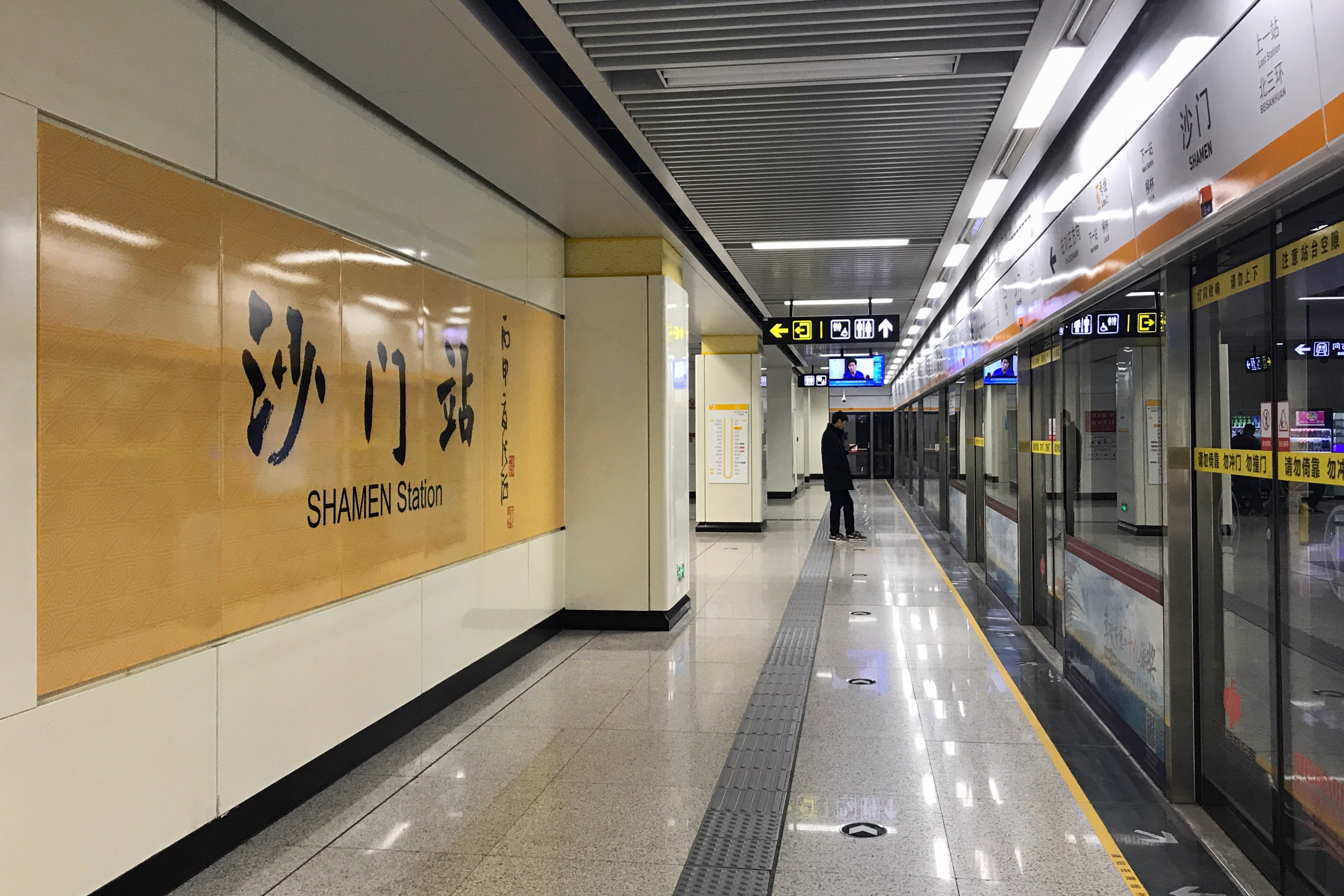
- Platforms of Line 2

General information
- Location: Huayuan N. Road × Guoji Road; Jinshui District, Zhengzhou; China
- Coordinates: 34.8206°N 113.6755°E
- System: Zhengzhou Metro rapid transit station
- Operator: Zhengzhou Metro
- Lines: Line 2; Line 4
- Platforms: 4 (2 island platforms)
- Connections: Bus

Construction
- Structure type: Underground

Other information
- Station code: 223

History
- Opened: 19 August 2016

Services
Preceding station	Zhengzhou Metro	Following station
Liulin towards Jiahe	Line 2	Beisanhuan towards Zhengzhou Hangkonggang Railway Station
Chenzhaidong towards Laoyachen	Line 4	Yangjunliu towards Langzhuang
Location
- Location within Zhengzhou

Shamen (Chinese: 沙门) is an interchange metro station of Zhengzhou Metro Line 2 and Line 4.

== Station layout ==
G	-	Exits
-1F	Concourse	Customer Service, Vending machines
-2F; Platforms	Platform 2	← Line 2 towards Jiahe (Liulin)
-2F; Platforms	Island platform, doors will open on the left
-2F; Platforms	Platform 1	→ Line 2 towards Nansihuan (Beisanhuan) →

== Exits ==
Exit	Destination
Exit A	Guoji Road (south side), Huayuan Road (east side)
Exit B	Guoji Road (south side), Huayuan Road (west side)
Exit C	Guoji Road (north side), Huayuan Road (west side)
Exit D	Guoji Road (north side), Huayuan Road (east side)
