= Erqiguangchang station =

Metro station in Zhengzhou, China

Erqiguangchang 二七广场
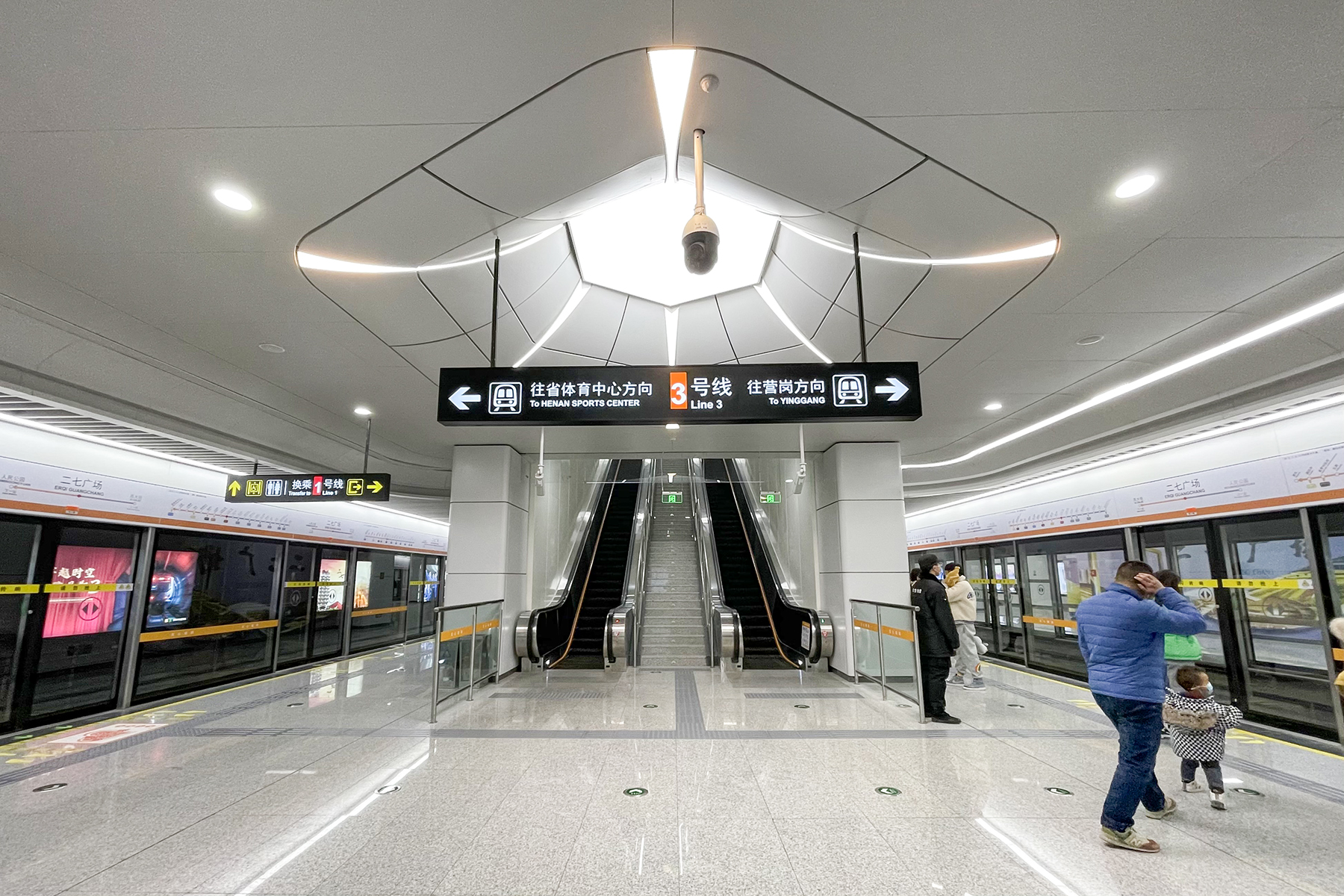
- The platforms for Line 3

General information
- Location: Zhengxing Street and Jiefang Road; Erqi District, Zhengzhou; China
- Coordinates: 34.7536°N 113.6597°E
- System: Zhengzhou Metro rapid transit station
- Operator: Zhengzhou Metro
- Lines: Line 1; Line 3
- Platforms: 5 (2 island platforms and 1 side platform)
- Connections: Bus

Construction
- Structure type: Underground

Other information
- Station code: 0129; 0329

History
- Opened: 28 December 2013

Services
Preceding station	Zhengzhou Metro	Following station
Zhengzhou Railway Station towards Henan University of Technology	Line 1	Renminlu towards New Campus of Henan University
Renmingongyuan towards Henan Sports Center	Line 3	Xidajie towards Binhe Xincheng Nan
Location
- Location within Zhengzhou

Erqiguangchang (Chinese: 二七广场, literally "Erqi Square" or "February 7 Square") is the interchange station of Line 1 and Line 3, Zhengzhou Metro. It was opened on 28 December 2013 along with Line 1. The station lies beneath the Erqi Square in downtown Zhengzhou.

== Usage ==
The usage of the station is very high since it serves one of the most crowded commercial area in Zhengzhou, with many shopping malls and department stores around. It is the station with the highest passenger volume in Zhengzhou metro system as of April 2018.

== Station layout ==
The station has 3 floors underground. The B1 floor is for the station concourse and the B2 and B3 floors are for the platforms and tracks of Line 1 and Line 3 respectively. The station has one island platform and two tracks for Line 1 and one island platform, one side platform and two tracks for Line 3.

G	-	Exits
B1	Concourse	Customer Service, Vending machines
B2	Platform 2	← Line 1 towards Henan University of Technology (Zhengzhou Railway Station)
B2	Island platform, doors will open on the left
B2	Platform 1	Line 1 towards New Campus of Henan University (Renminlu) →

== Exits ==
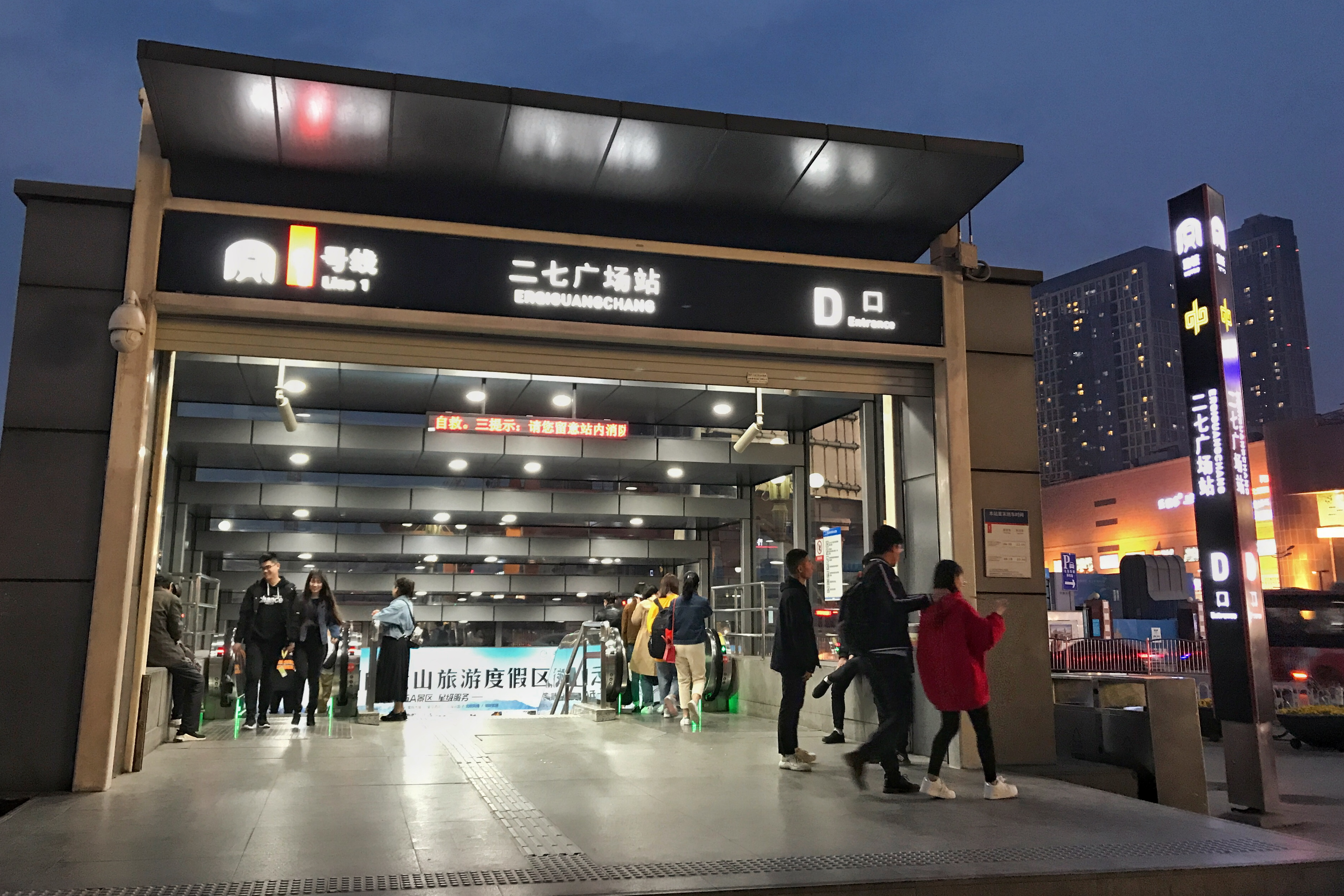
Exit D of the station

Exit	Destination	Bus connections
Exit A	Renmin Road, Shangcheng Building	
Exit B	Xi Dajie, Tianran Department Store	
Exit D	Dehua Pedestrian Street, Erqi Memorial Tower	
Exit F	Zhengxing Street (south side)	2, 6, 9, 26, 28, 32, 34, 35, 40, 52, 60, 85, 109, 900, 903, 906, 966, 游51; Night services: Y1, Y5, Y6, Y10, Y11, Y12
Exit H	Jiafang Road, The MixC Zhengzhou	
Exit I	Erqi Road, Hualian Department Store	
Exit K	Zhengxing Street	
Exit L	Zhengxing Street, The MixC Zhengzhou	

== Surroundings ==
- Erqi Memorial Tower (二七纪念塔)
- Dehua Pedestrian Street (德化步行街)
- Hualian Department Store (华联商厦)
- MixC Zhengzhou (郑州万象城)
- David Plaza (大卫城)
