= Huayuan Road Subdistrict =

Huayuan Road Subdistrict may refer to:

- Huayuanlu Subdistrict, Beijing
- Huayuan Road Subdistrict, Zhengzhou
