= Zhengzhou No.8 Middle School =

- 郑州市第八中学

Location
- No.7, Jingwu Road; Jinshui District; Zhengzhou, Henan; China
- Coordinates: 34°46′13″N 113°40′45″E

Information
- Type: Public
- Established: July, 1952
- Website: web.archive.org/web/20080905153813/http://www.zzbz.net/ (archive)

Zhengzhou No.8 Middle School (Chinese: 郑州市 第八 中学; pinyin: Zhèng-zhōu-shì dì-bā zhōng-xué) is a junior high school in Zhengzhou, Henan, China. It was established in July 1952 and is located at Jingwu Road, Jinshui District.

The middle school became one of the Key Middle Schools of Henan Province. Its practice base received a provincial award in 2008.
