= Duling Street Subdistrict =

Coordinates: 34°45′48″N 113°39′57″E

Duling Street Subdistrict 杜岭街街道
- Subdistrict

Chinese transcription(s)
- Interactive map of Duling Street Subdistrict
- Country: China
- Province: Henan
- Prefecture: Zhengzhou
- District: Jinshui District
- Time zone: UTC+8 (China Standard Time)

Duling Avenue Subdistrict (Chinese: 杜岭街街道; pinyin: Dùlǐng Jiē Jiēdào) is a subdistrict situated in Jinshui District, Zhengzhou in the province of Henan, China.

== See also ==
- List of township-level divisions of Henan
