= Jingba Road Subdistrict =

Coordinates: 34°46′10″N 113°39′48″E

Jingba Road Subdistrict 经八路街道
- Subdistrict

Chinese transcription(s)
- Interactive map of Jingba Road Subdistrict
- Country: China
- Province: Henan
- Prefecture: Zhengzhou
- District: Jinshui District
- Time zone: UTC+8 (China Standard Time)

Jingba Road Subdistrict (Chinese: 经八路街道; pinyin: Jïngbālù Jiēdào) is a subdistrict in Jinshui District, Zhengzhou in the province of Henan, China.

== See also ==
- List of township-level divisions of Henan
