= Dennis (Chinese retailer) =

Chinese department store chain

- Native name: 郑州丹尼斯百货有限公司
- Industry: Retail
- Founded: 1995 in Zhengzhou, China
- Headquarters: Zhengzhou, China
- Website: www.dennis.com.cn

Dennis (Chinese: 丹尼斯百货) is a department store chain which operates a network of branches across cities in Henan, China. Zhengzhou Dennis Department Store Co. Ltd. sells a wide range of merchandise. Garments, cosmetics, jewelry, furniture, home appliances, and other everyday items are sold by the company.

From its opening up in 1995 to 2003, the total sales of the Dennis department store was 4.92 billion yuan. It was ranked 72nd in the top 100 Retail chain stores in the country and 24th in the top 100 single store sales in 2002. In 2003, it was ranked 79th in the Top 100 Retail Enterprises.

The board member is Wang Ren-Sheng.

== Stores ==
- Renmin Road store (Chinese: 丹尼斯百货人民店): Opened on 16 November 1997 and is the first Dennis department store. Located on Renmin Road in Jinshui District, Zhengzhou
- Huayuan Road store (Chinese: 丹尼斯百货花园店): Opened on 31 May 2008. Located at the crossing of Huayuan Road and Nongye Road in Jinshui District, Zhengzhou. It has 16 levels above ground and 2 basement levels, making it the department store with most levels in China.
- Midtown Seven (Chinese: 丹尼斯七天地): Located at the CBD area of Zhengdong New Area. The shopping complex is composed of seven separated parts connected by overhead corridors.
- David Plaza (Chinese: 丹尼斯大卫城): One of the largest shopping malls in Zhengzhou. Opened in 2015.
