= Henan Experimental Middle School =

K12 school of the People's Republic of China

- 河南省实验中学

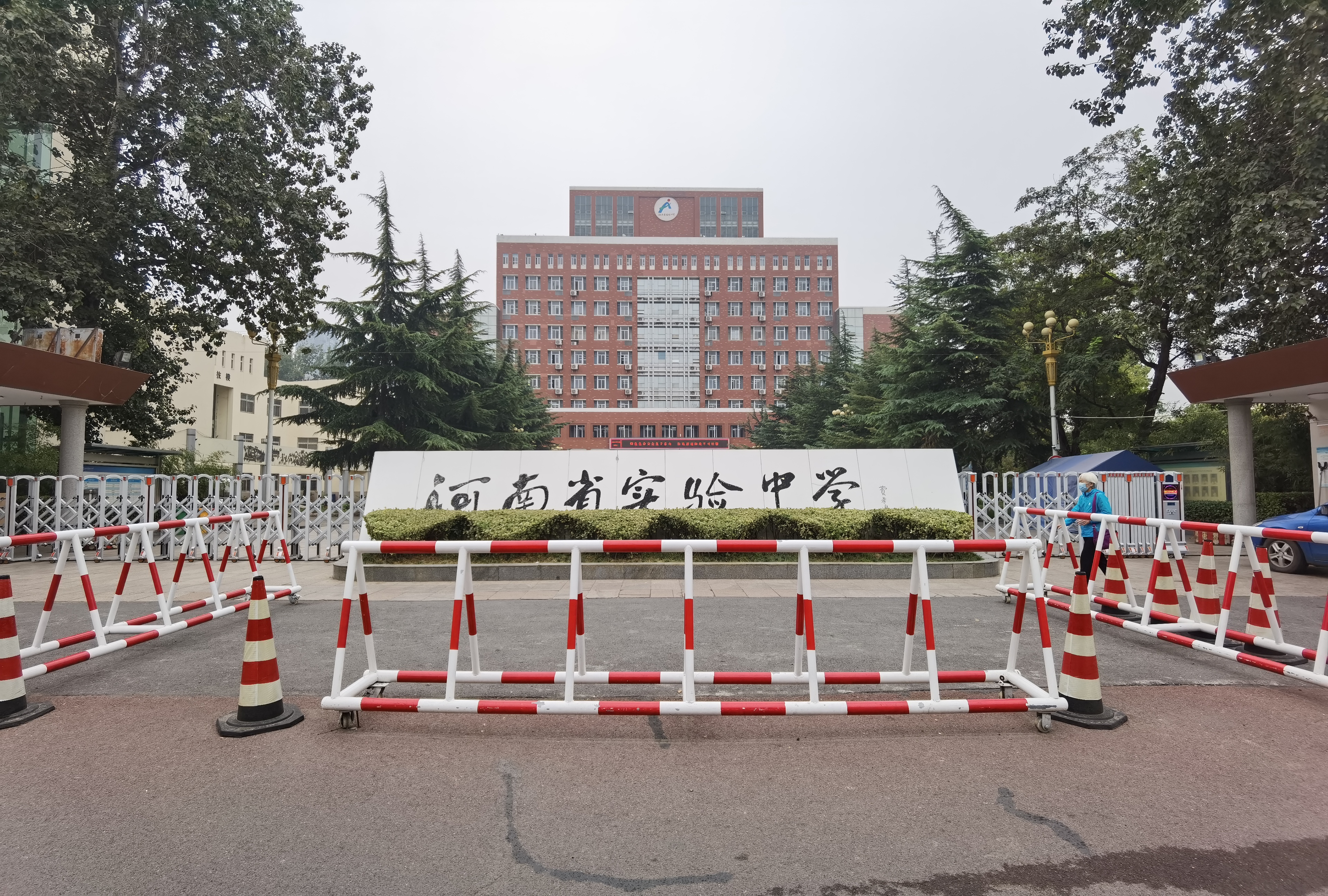
- Entrance to the school in 2020

Location
- 60 Wenhua Road, Jinshui District; Zhengzhou, Henan, 450002; China; 34°47′34″N 113°39′44″E

Information
- Other name: Henan Experimental High School
- Type: Public secondary school
- Motto: 异想天开，脚踏实地
- Established: 1957
- Authority: Henan Provincial Department of Education
- Educational authority: Nova Scotia Curriculum
- Website: www.hnssyzx.cn

Henan Experimental Middle School
- Traditional Chinese: 河南省實驗中學
- Simplified Chinese: 河南省实验中学
Transcriptions

Henan Experimental High School or called Henan Experimental Middle School, is a K-12 school of the People's Republic of China, located in Zhengzhou, Henan's Jinshui District. It has the abbreviation as "HEHS". It was founded in 1957 as the Affiliated Middle School of Zhengzhou Teachers' Vocational School, later becoming the Affiliated Middle School of Zhengzhou Teachers' College, the Affiliated Middle School of Zhengzhou University, and the Zhengzhou 40th Middle School before being given its present name in 1979.

As of 2006, official statistics stated that it enrolled 2,800 students, though other reports put its student body at 10,300. Along with students of the Zhengzhou First Middle School and the Zhengzhou Foreign Languages Middle School, students from Henan Experimental are said to have the best language abilities in the province; many students from the school apply to overseas universities, especially in the United States. Diplomas of its international division, which is jointly operated by the Nova Scotia, Ministry of Education and that of Henan province, are recognised by both the Canadian and Chinese governments. In a 2016 ranking of Chinese high schools that send students to study in American universities, Henan Experimental Middle School ranked number 47 in mainland China in terms of the number of students entering top American universities.

However, the school has been criticized for its participation in the trend of commercialization of education, in particular for its high tuition fees and the 400% increase in the size of its student body from 2003 to 2006, which earned it a total revenue of RMB176 million.
