= David Plaza (shopping mall) =

Coordinates: 34.758198°N 113.659878°E

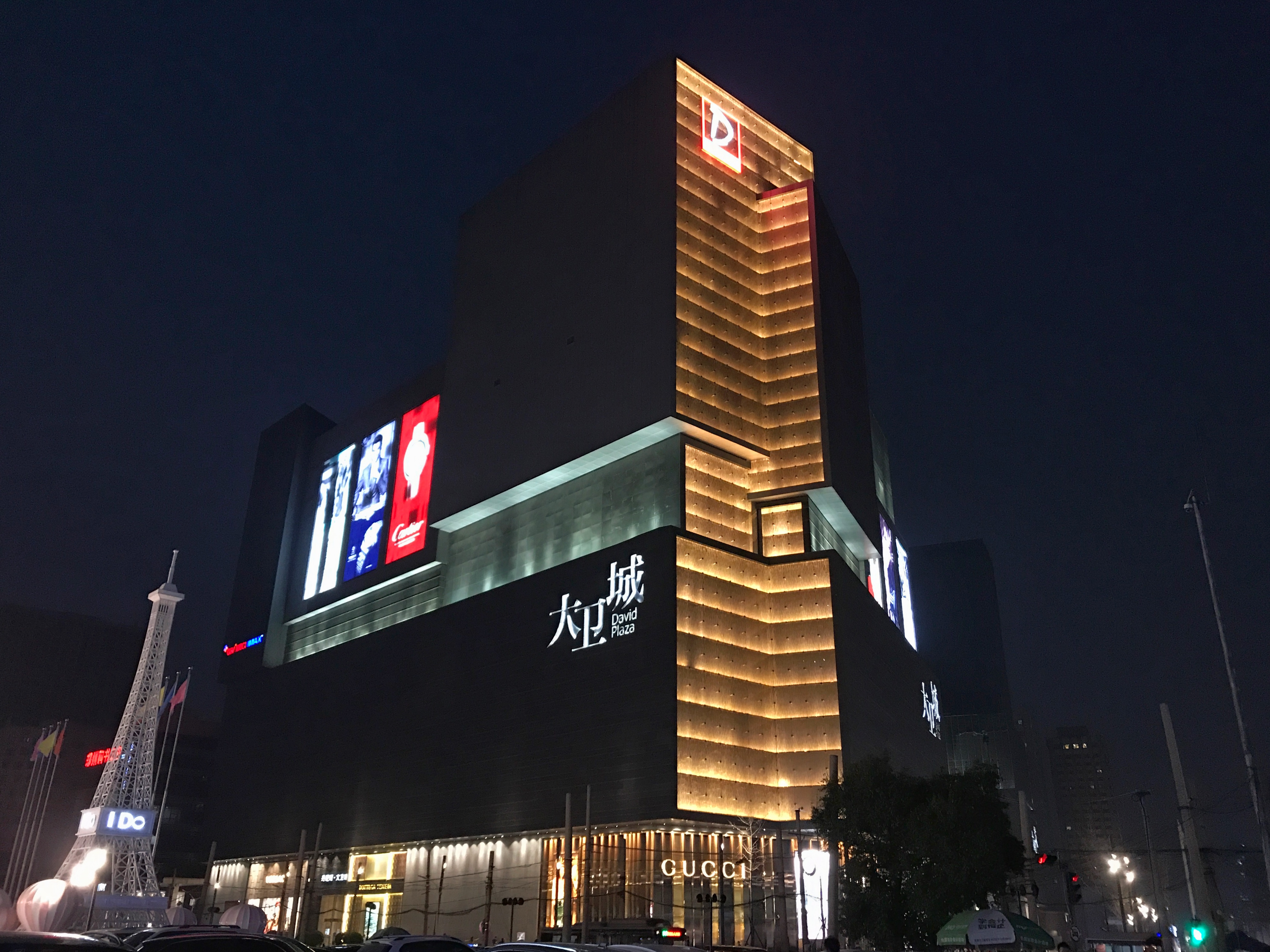
- Location: Jinshui District, Zhengzhou, China
- Address: Erqi Road
- Opened: 2015
- Developer: Dennis
- Num. of stores: Over 700 shops and restaurants
- Floor area: Approximately 400,000 square metres (4,300,000 sq ft)
- Floors: 14 above ground and 4 basement levels
- Parking: 2000 parking spaces
- Website: www.dennis.com.cn/dwc/index.jhtml

David Plaza (Chinese: 大卫城) is a complex with a shopping mall and a hotel (planned) in Zhengzhou, China. The complex is situated at the crossing of Erqi Road and Taikang Road, within the Erqi commercial area, which is a major shopping district in Zhengzhou. Opened in 2015, it is one of the largest and most luxurious shopping malls in Zhengzhou.

== Features ==
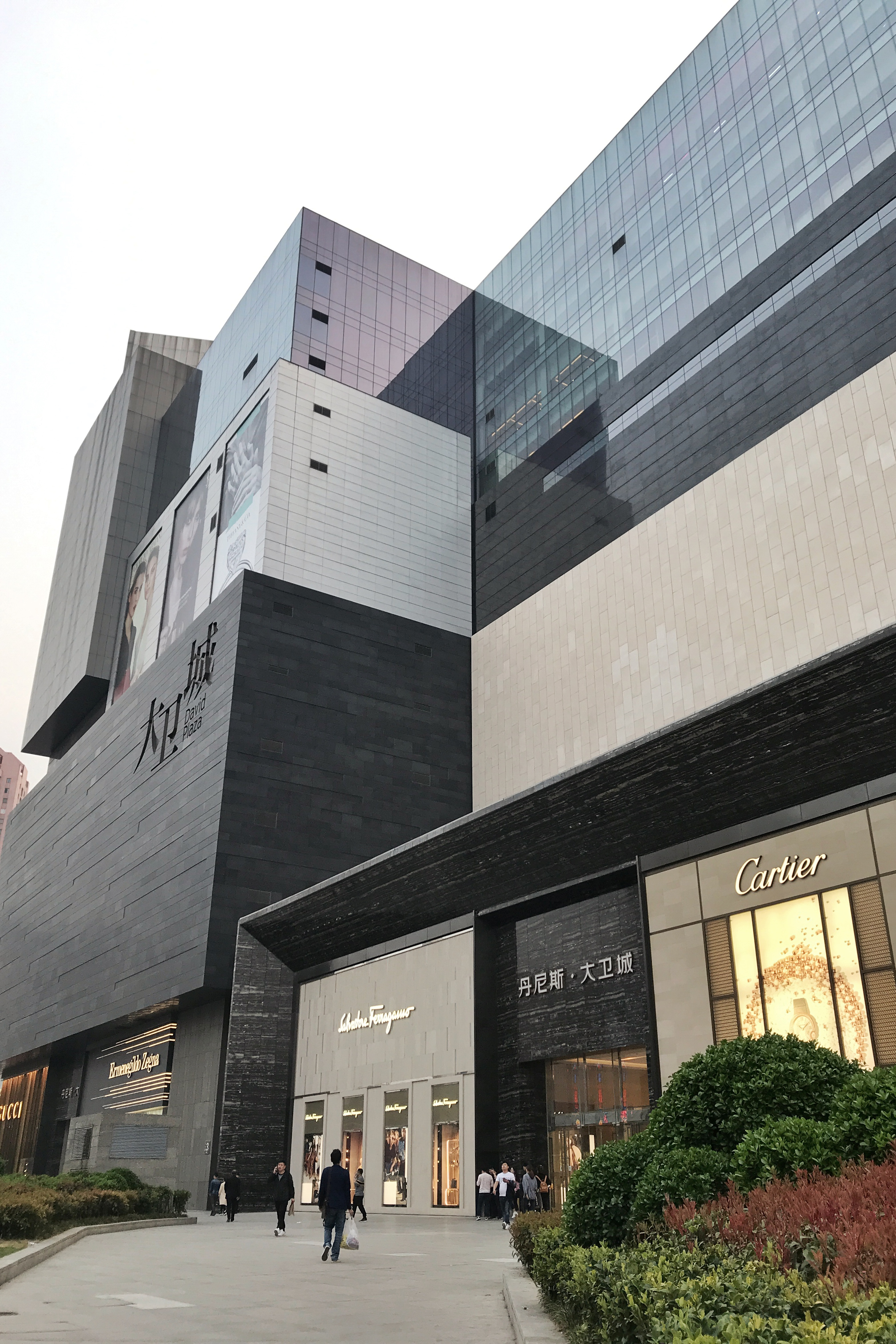

The complex has two towers. Tower A houses a Dennis Department Store and Tower B has been planned to house a hotel. The mall is situated in Tower A and the podium building. The first level of the mall houses many high-end brands, including Louis Vuitton, Cartier, Burberry, Yves Saint Laurent, Salvatore Ferragamo, Bottega Veneta, Tiffany & Co., Bulgari, etc. There is an ice-skating rink on the 5th level and a CGV cinema on the 6th level. Restaurants are mainly located on levels 10 to 12.
