= Henan Experimental Primary School =

Coordinates: 34°46′5″N 113°41′26″E

- 河南省 实验 小学

Location
- No.6, Jing'er Road; Jinshui District; Zhengzhou, Henan; China

Information
- Type: Public
- Established: 1960
- Website: http://www.hnssyxx.com/

Henan Experimental Primary School (Chinese: 河南省实验小学; pinyin: Hénán Shěn Shíyàn Xiǎoxué), founded in 1960, is a primary school in Jinshui District, Zhengzhou, Henan, China.

It was selected as one of the ten Olympics Education Model Schools in Henan in 2007.
