= Beilin Road Subdistrict =

Coordinates: 34.80687°N 113.68514°E

Beilin Road Subdistrict 北林路街道
- Subdistrict

Chinese transcription(s)
- Interactive map of Beilin Road Subdistrict
- Country: China
- Province: Henan
- Prefecture: Zhengzhou
- District: Jinshui District
- Time zone: UTC+8 (China Standard Time)

Beilin Road Subdistrict (Chinese: 北林路街道; pinyin: Běilín Lù Jiēdào) is a subdistrict situated in Jinshui District, Zhengzhou in the province of Henan, China.

== See also ==
- List of township-level divisions of Henan
