= Dashiqiao Subdistrict, Zhengzhou =

Coordinates: 34.76408°N 113.64284°E

Dashiqiao Subdistrict 大石桥街道
- Subdistrict

Chinese transcription(s)
- Interactive map of Dashiqiao Subdistrict
- Country: China
- Province: Henan
- Prefecture: Zhengzhou
- District: Jinshui District
- Time zone: UTC+8 (China Standard Time)

Dashiqiao Subdistrict (Chinese: 大石桥街道; pinyin: Dàshíqiáo Jiēdào) is a subdistrict situated in Jinshui District, Zhengzhou in the province of Henan, China.

== See also ==
- List of township-level divisions of Henan
