= Huayuan Road Subdistrict, Zhengzhou =

Coordinates: 34°46′11″N 113°40′47″E

Huayuan Road Subdistrict 花园路街道
- Subdistrict

Chinese transcription(s)
- Interactive map of Huayuan Road Subdistrict
- Country: China
- Province: Henan
- Prefecture: Zhengzhou
- District: Jinshui District
- Time zone: UTC+8 (China Standard Time)

Huayuan Road Subdistrict (Chinese: 花园路街道; pinyin: Huāyuánlù Jiēdào) is a subdistrict in Jinshui District, Zhengzhou in the province of Henan, China.

== See also ==
- List of township-level divisions of Henan
