= Renmin Road Subdistrict, Zhengzhou =

Renmin Road Subdistrict 人民路街道
- Subdistrict
- Location in Henan
- Coordinates: 34.75906°N 113.67684°E
- Country: China
- Province: Henan
- Prefecture-level city: Zhengzhou
- District: Jinshui District
- Time zone: UTC+8 (China Standard Time)

Renmin Road Subdistrict (Chinese: 人民路街道; pinyin: Rénmínlù Jiēdào) is a subdistrict situated in Jinshui District, Zhengzhou in the province of Henan, China. As of 2020, it administers the following nine residential neighborhoods:

- Renmin Road Community (人民路社区)
- Gongrenxincun Community (工人新村社区)
- Zijingshan Road Community (紫荆山路社区)
- Dongli Road Community (东里路社区)
- Shuiwenju Community (水文局社区)
- Shunhe Road First Community (顺河路第一社区)
- Shunhe Road Second Community (顺河路第二社区)
- Shunhe Road Third Community (顺河路第三社区)
- Jinziyiyuan Community (金紫伊苑社区)

== See also ==
- List of township-level divisions of Henan
