= Jinshui, Zhengzhou =

Jinshui 金水区
- District
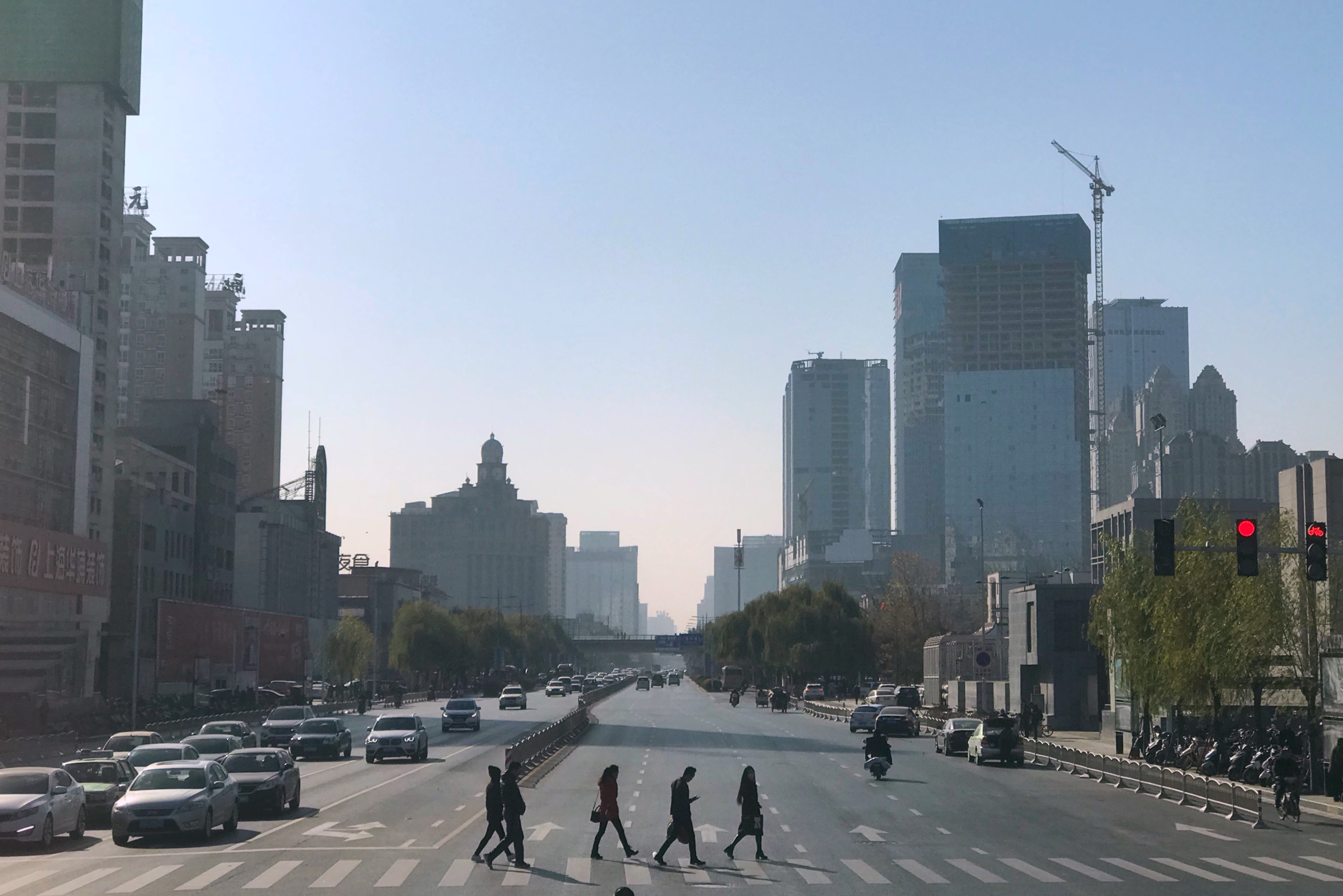
- Huayuan Road

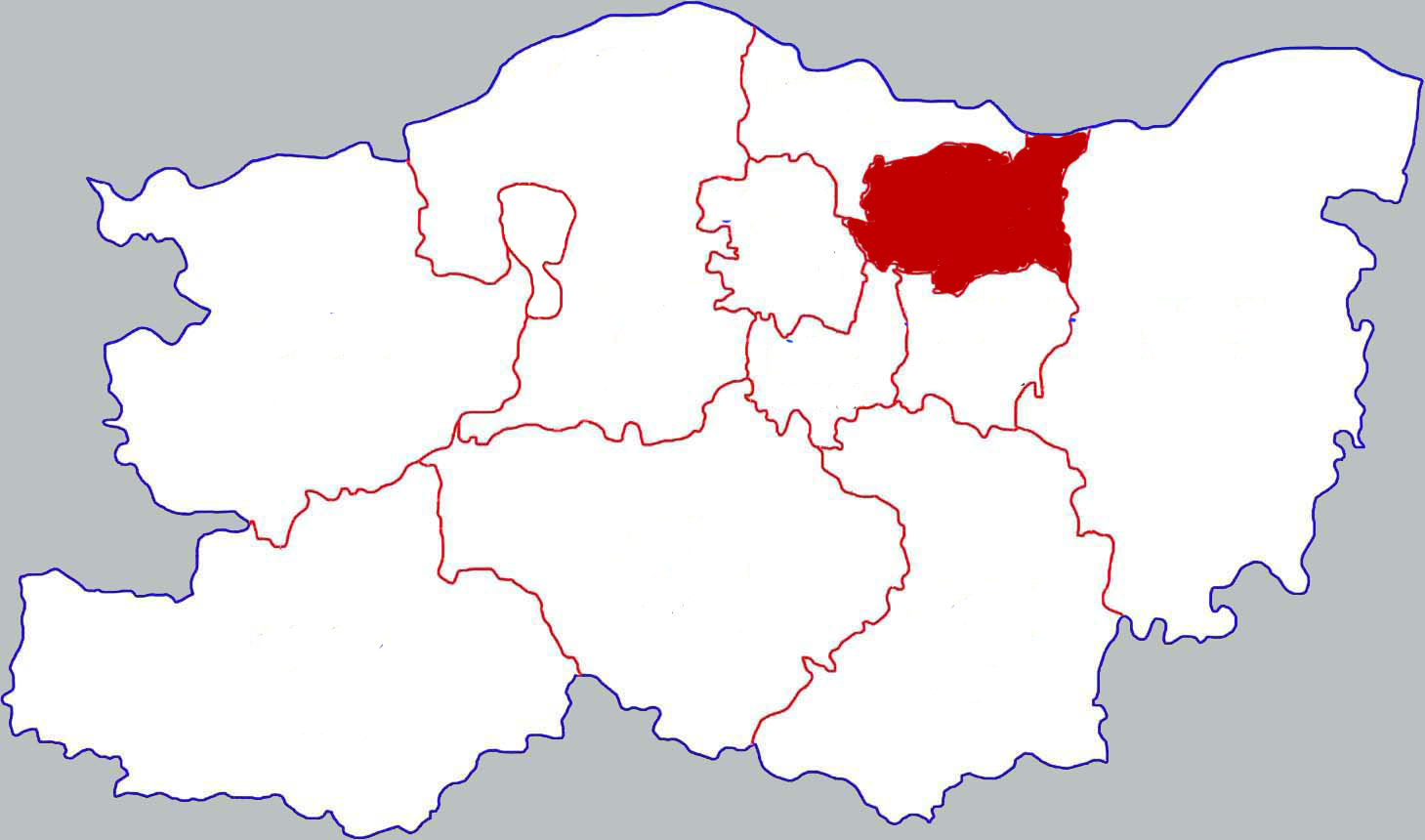
- Location in Zhengzhou

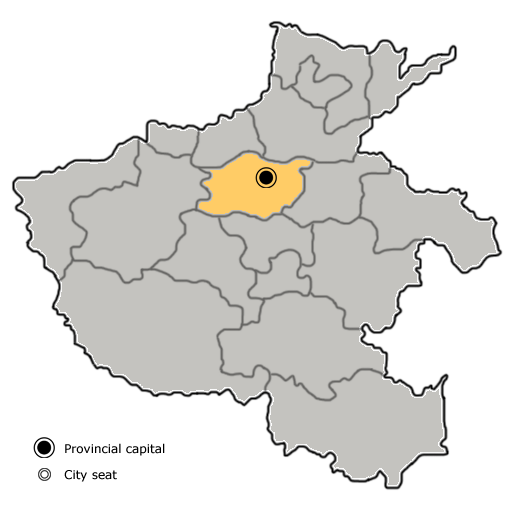
- Zhengzhou in Henan
- Coordinates: 34°46′22.59″N 113°43′9.62″E
- Country: People's Republic of China
- Province: Henan
- Prefecture-level city: Zhengzhou

Area
  - District: 242 km^{2} (93 sq mi)
  - Urban: 70.65 km^{2} (27.28 sq mi)

Population (2019)
  - District: 1,764,700
  - Density: 7,290/km^{2} (18,900/sq mi)
- Time zone: UTC+8 (China Standard)
- Postal code: 450003
- Area code: 0371
- Website: www.jinshui.gov.cn

Jinshui District (Chinese: 金水区; pinyin: Jīnshuǐ Qū) is one of 6 urban districts of the prefecture-level city of Zhengzhou, the capital of Henan Province, South Central China. The district is 135.3 km^{2} (52.2 sq mi) in which the urban area is 70.65 km^{2} (27.28 sq mi). The total population is 1.4 million.

The district is seat to the Henan provincial government as well as the most developed city district in Zhengzhou and the province.

== Administrative divisions ==
Jinshui District has 17 subdistricts:

- Subdistricts:
  - Jingba Road Subdistrict (经八路街道)
  - Huayuan Road Subdistrict (花园路街道)
  - Renmin Road Subdistrict (人民路街道)
  - Duling Street Subdistrict (杜岭街街道)
  - Dashiqiao Subdistrict (大石桥街道)
  - Nanyang Road Subdistrict (南阳路街道)
  - Nanyang New Village Subdistrict (南阳新村街道)
  - Wenhua Road Subdistrict (文化路街道)
  - Fengchan Road Subdistrict (丰产路街道)
  - Dongfeng Road Subdistrict (东风路街道)
  - Beilin Road Subdistrict (北林路街道)
  - Weilai Road Subdistrict (未来路街道)
  - Longzihu Subdistrict (龙子湖街道)
  - Zhaicheng Road Subdistrict (祭城路街道)
  - Fenghuangtai Subdistrict (凤凰台街道)
  - Yangjin Road Subdistrict (杨金路街道)
  - Fengqing Road Subdistrict (丰庆路街道)

Former Subdistricts

- Jicheng Road Subdistrict (祭城路街道) and Xingda Road Subdistrict (兴达路街道)

== Education ==
The area around Jianxue Street (Chinese: 俭学街) is a main educational area. The famous Henan Experimental Middle School, No.8 Middle School, No.9 Middle School, the Henan Foreign Trade School, Henan Experimental Primary School and the No.1 Primary School of Wenhua Road, Zhengzhou are in the district.

== Gallery ==
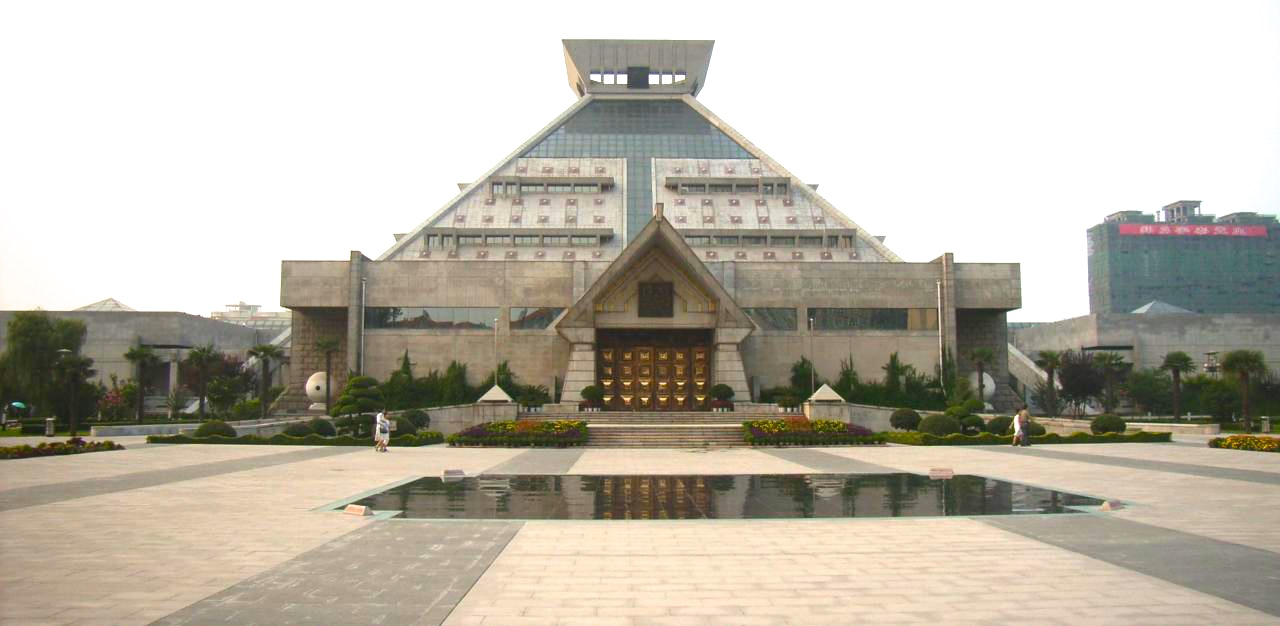
Henan Museum, located in Jinshui District

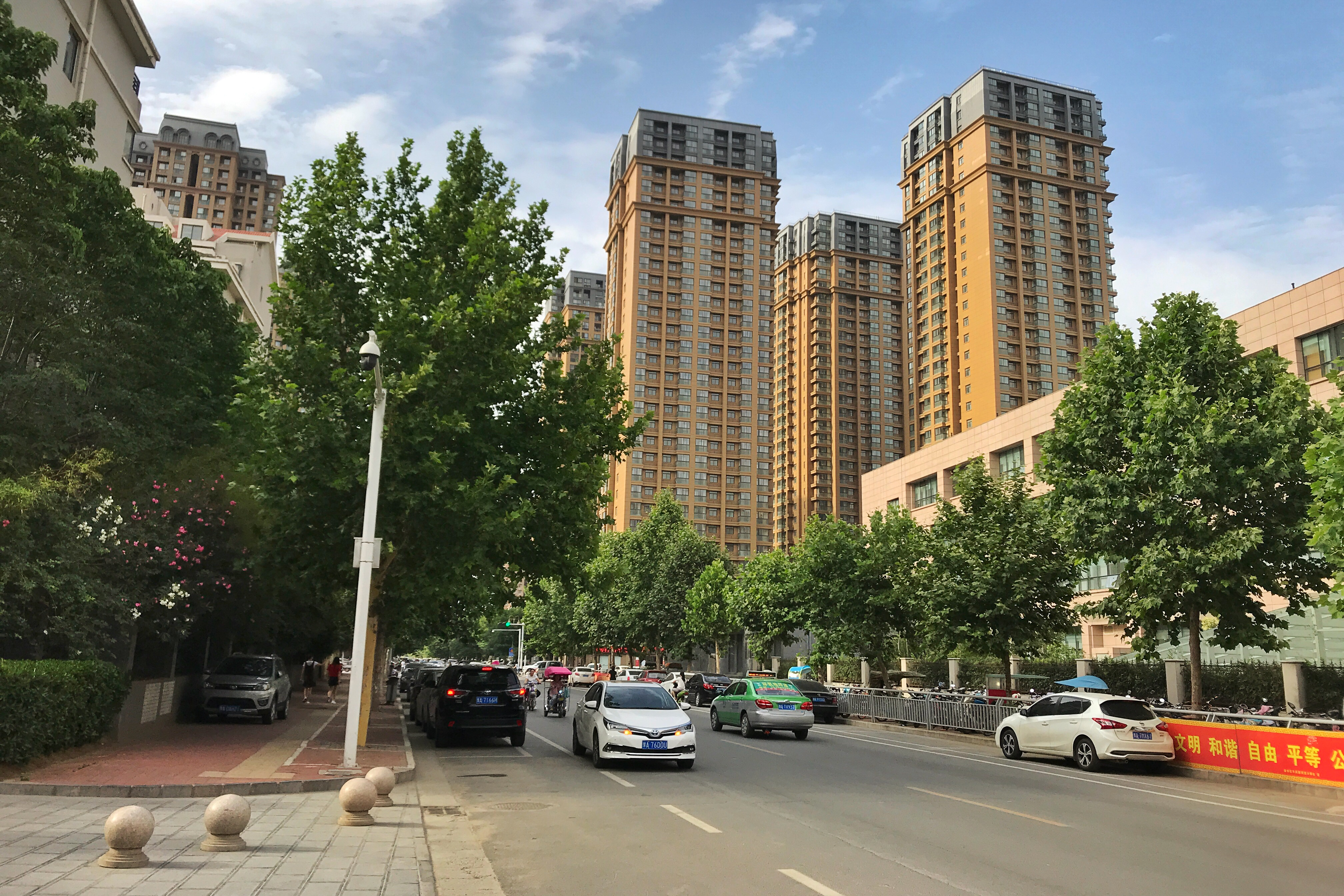
Street scene of Jinshui District (Puqing Road)
