= Lucheng Guangchang station =

Metro station in Zhengzhou, China

Lucheng Guangchang 绿城广场
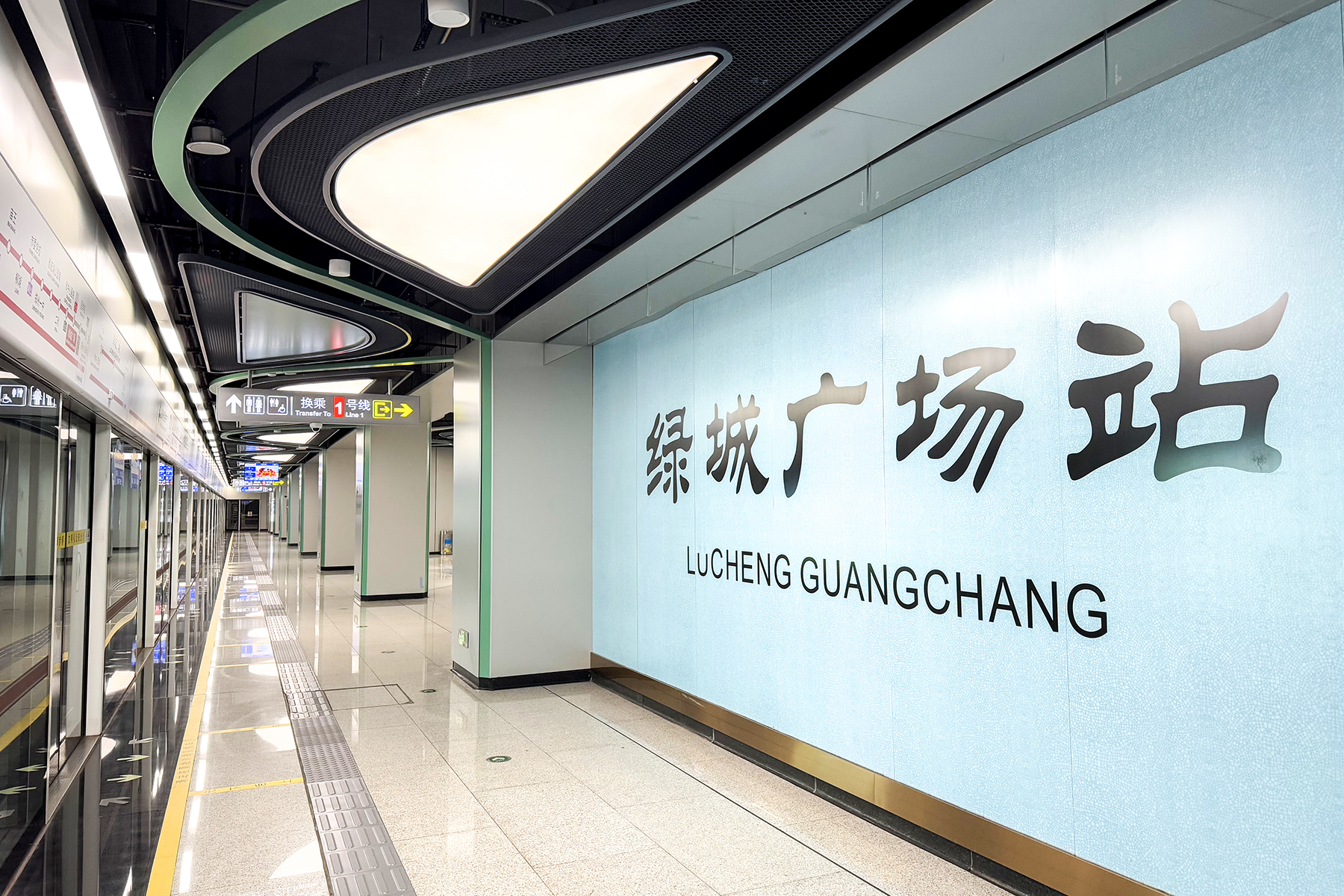
- Platform of Line 10

General information
- Location: Zhongyuan East Road; Erqi District, Zhengzhou; China
- Coordinates: 34°44′55″N 113°37′39″E
- System: Zhengzhou Metro rapid transit station
- Operator: Zhengzhou Metro
- Lines: Line 1; Line 10
- Platforms: 4 (2 island platforms)
- Connections: Bus

Construction
- Structure type: Underground

Other information
- Station code: 126

History
- Opened: 28 December 2013 (Line 1); 28 September 2023 (Line 10)
- Former names: Lyucheng Square (up to 2017)

Services
| Preceding station | Zhengzhou Metro | Following station |
|---|---|---|
| Bishagang towards Henan University of Technology | Line 1 | Yixueyuan towards New Campus of Henan University |
| Zhengzhou Central Hospital towards Zhengzhouxi Railway Station | Line 10 | Yixueyuan towards Zhengzhou Railway Station |
Location

Lucheng Guangchang (Chinese: 绿城广场; pinyin: Lǜchéng Guǎngchǎng; lit. 'Lücheng Square'), formerly knows as Lyucheng Square, is a metro station of Zhengzhou Metro Line 1 and Line 10. The station lies beneath the Zhongyuan Road, to the east of the Lücheng Square.

== Station layout ==
The station can be seen as two parts. Part 1 is for line 1 and part 2 is for lines 9 and 10. Passengers can using the transfer passage to go through two concourses.

Part 1 has two floors. B1 floor is a concourse. B2 floor is an island platform with two tracks for line 1. Part 2 has three floors. B1 floor is the concourse. B2 and B3 floors are platform levels. B2 is for line 9 and B3 is for line 10. Each of them consists of an island platform with two tracks. Because line 9 is still under planning, the part of line 9 is not in use.

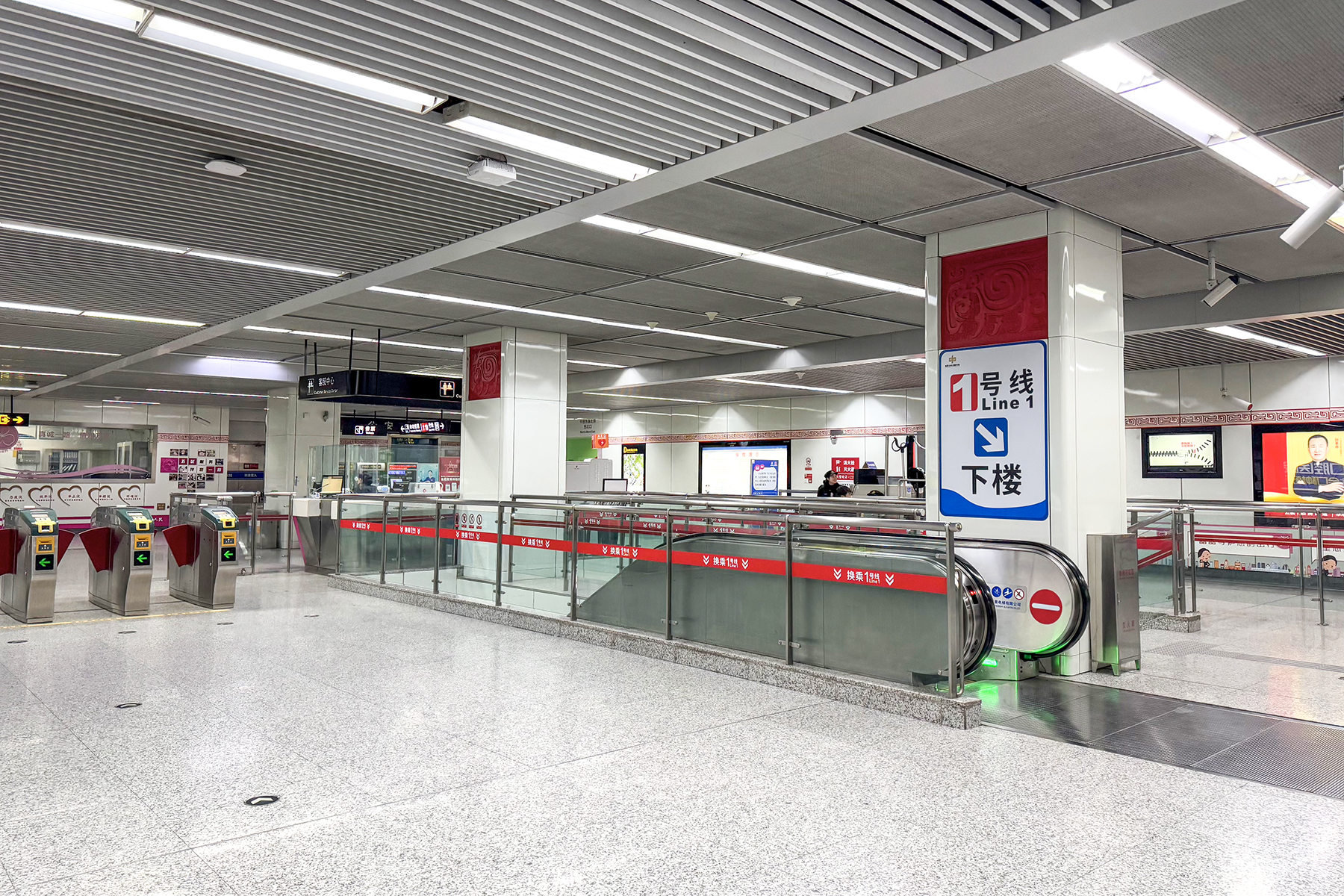
Concourse of Line 1

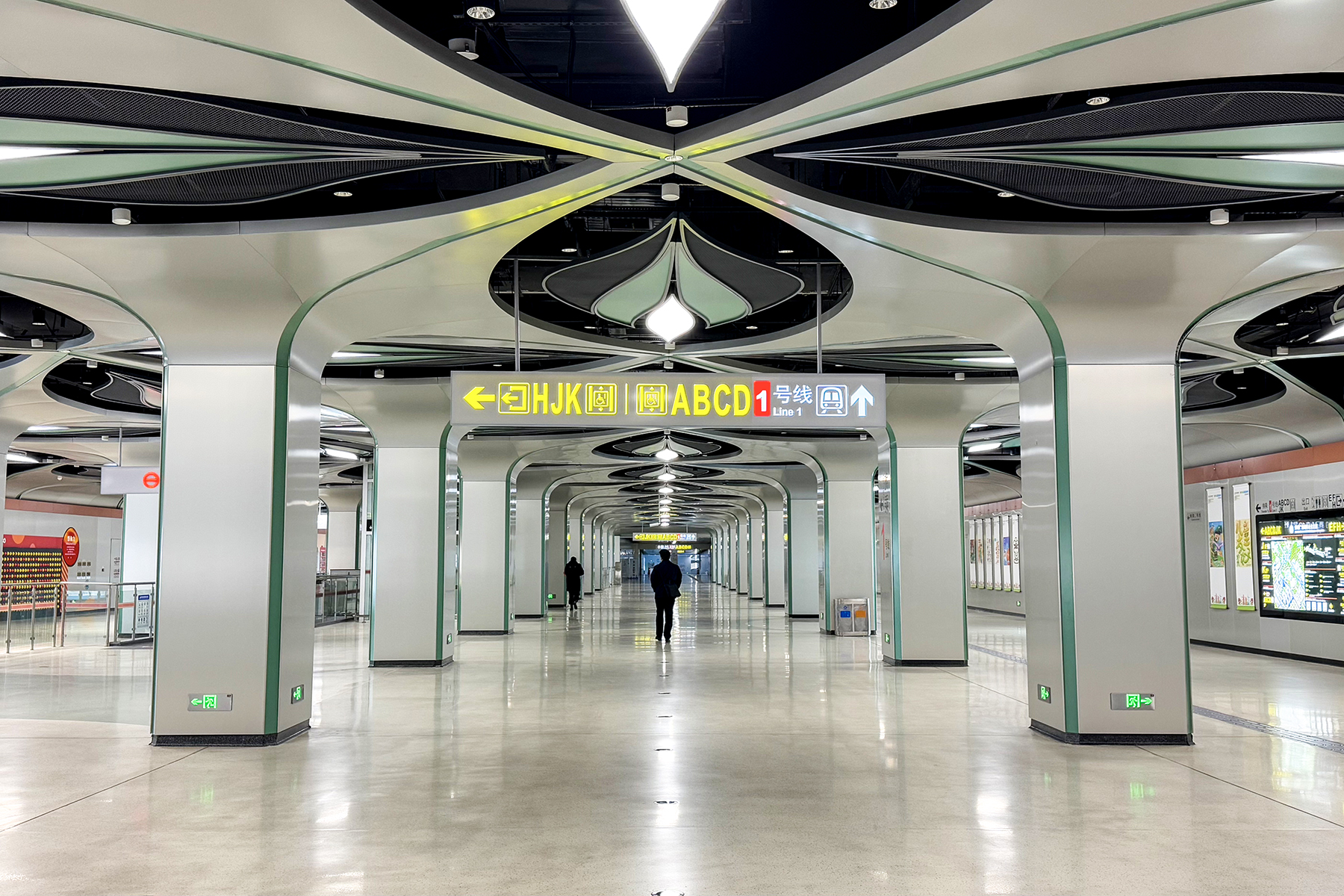
Concourse of Line 10

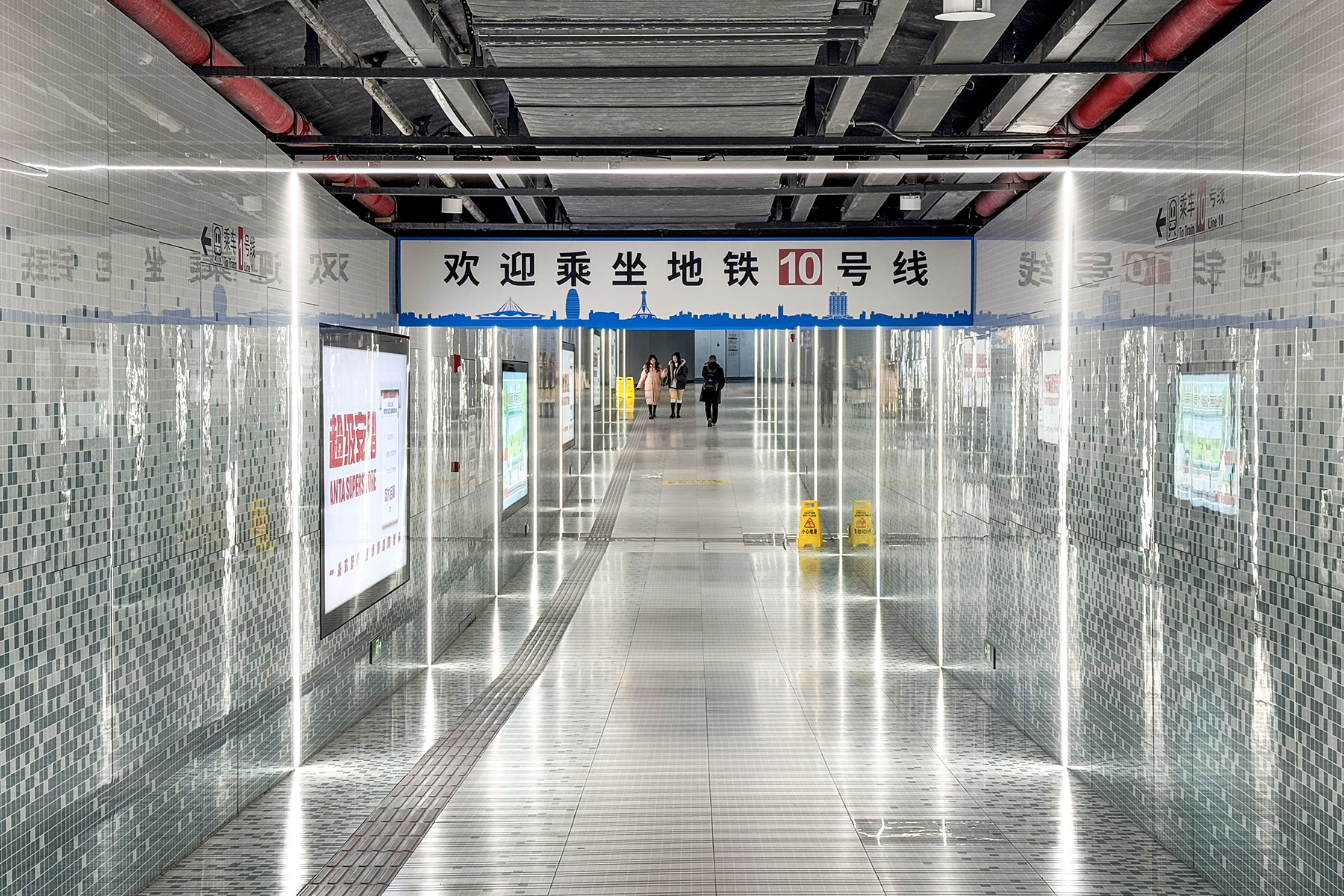
Transfer passage

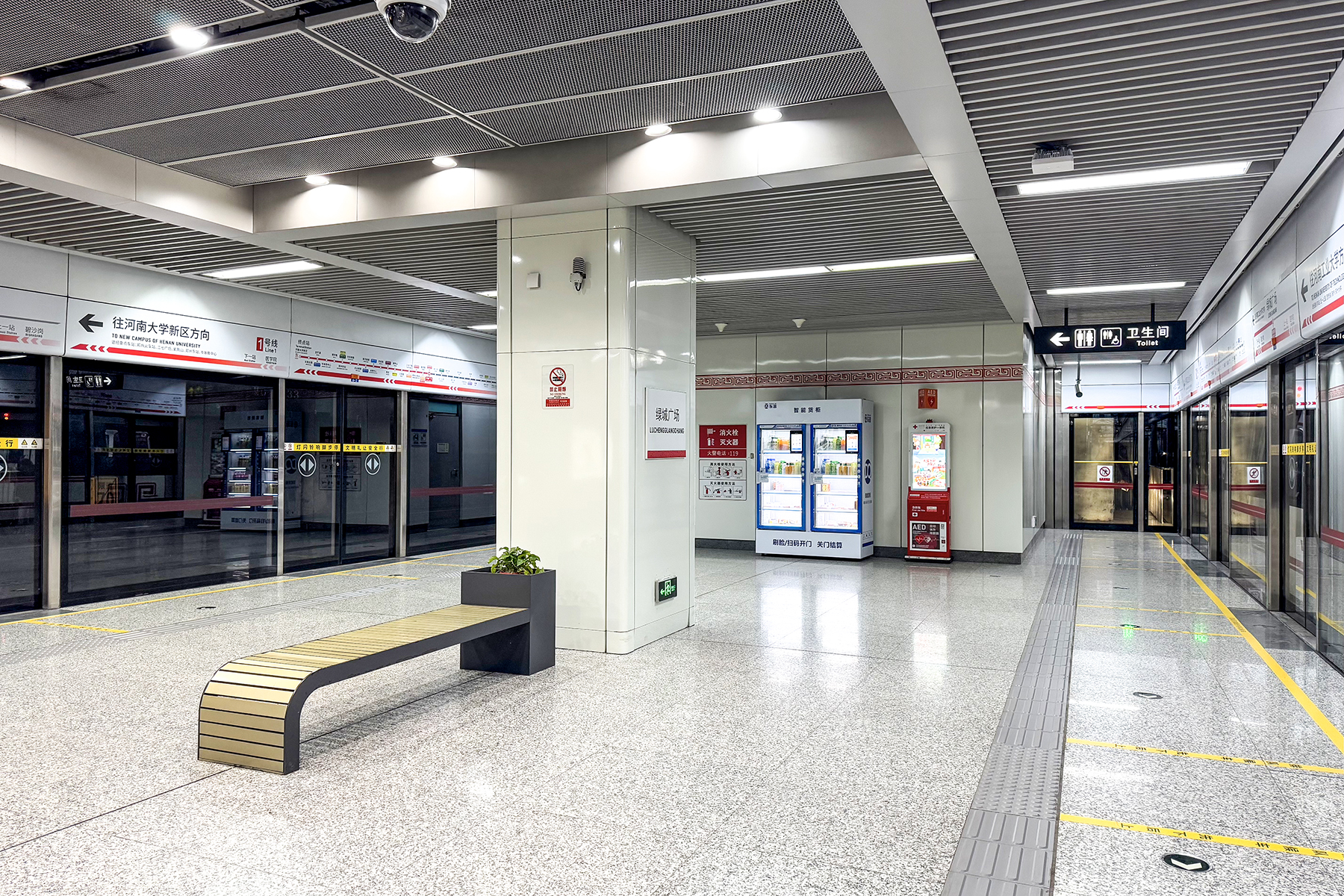
Platforms of Line 1

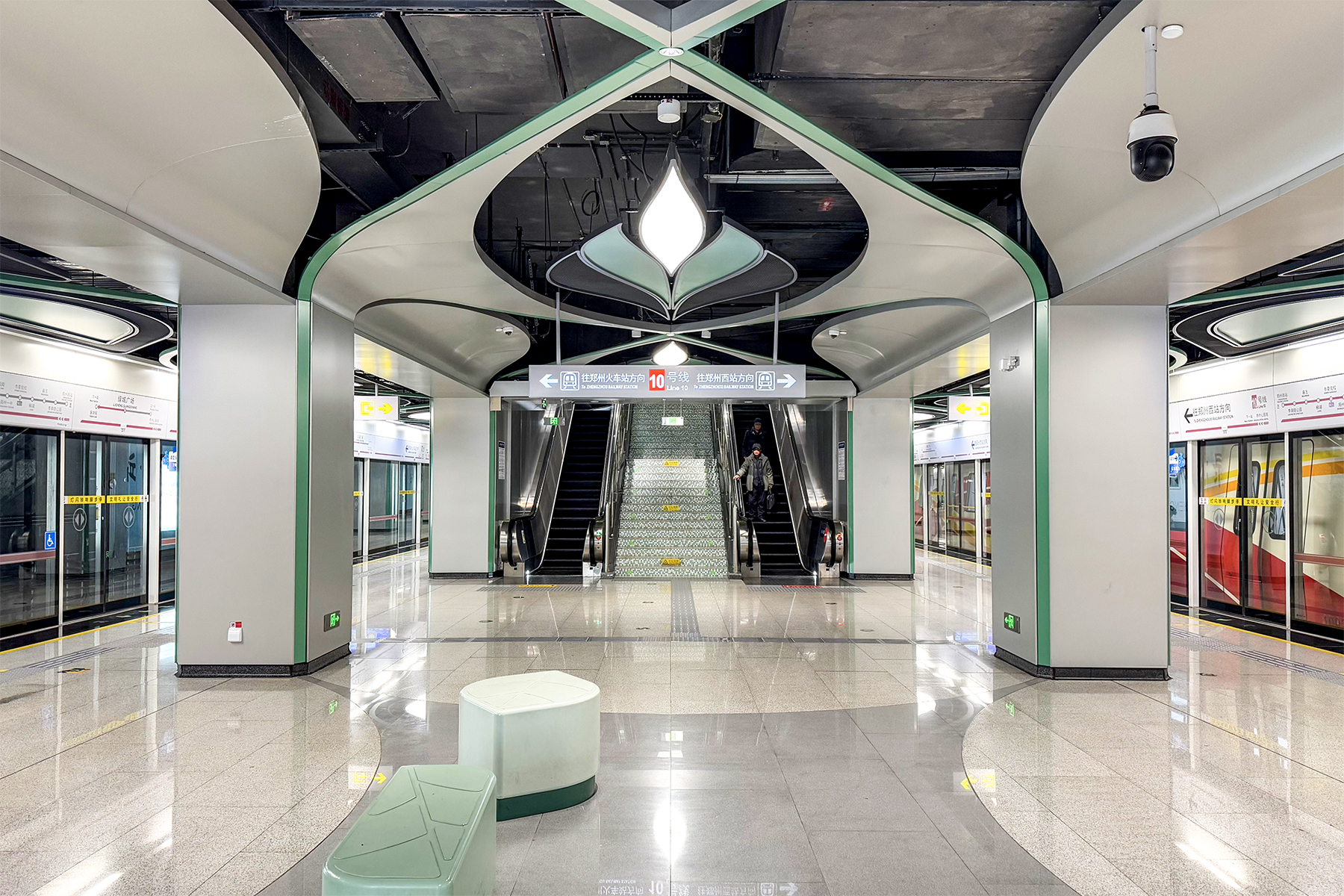
Platforms of Line 10

== Entrances/exits ==
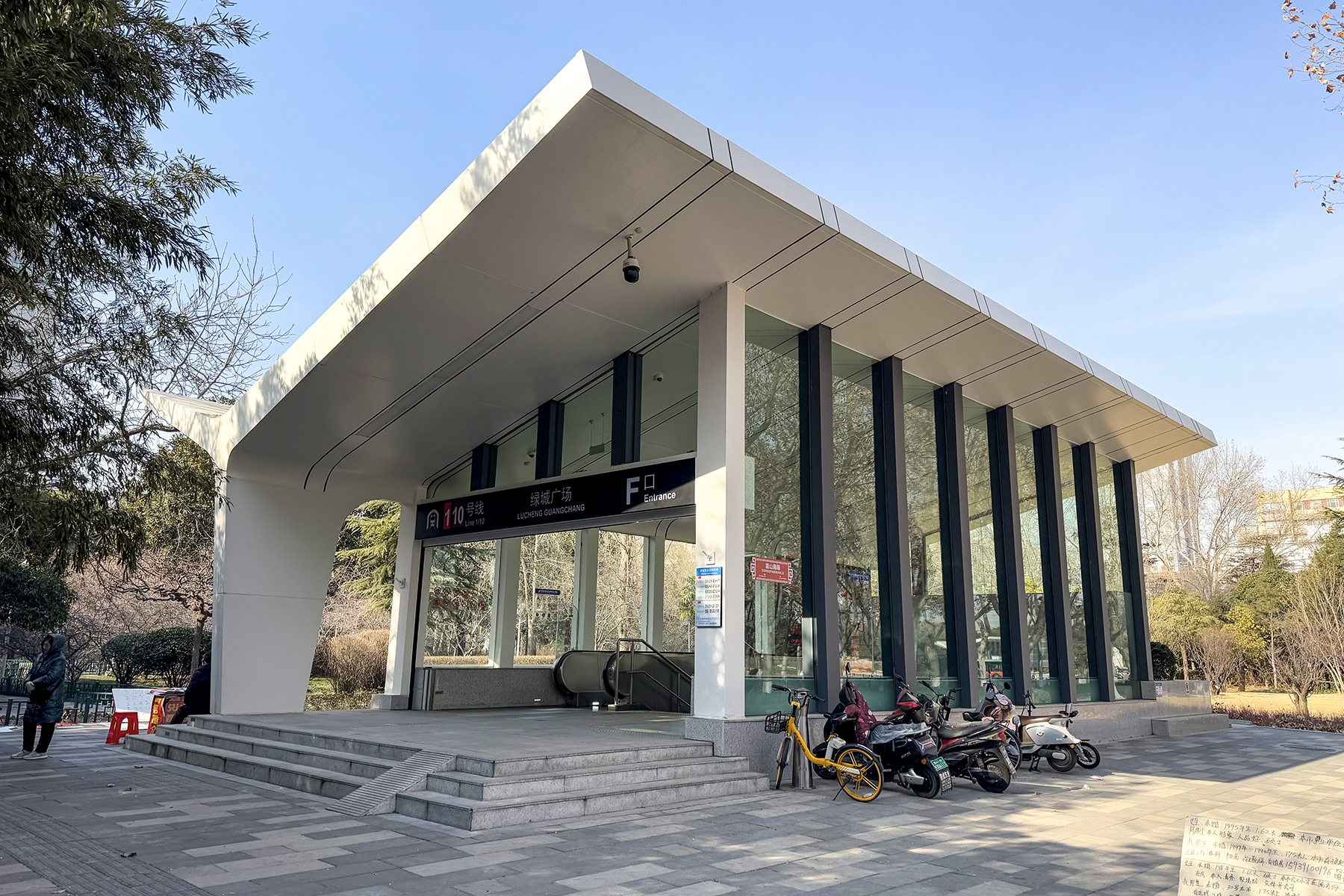
Entrance F

Lucheng Square has nine exits. Exits A-D connect Line 1 and exits E-K connect Line 10.

- A: Zhongyuan East Road (north side)
- B: Zhongyuan East Road (south side)
- C: Lücheng Square
- D: Zhongyuan East Road (north side)
- E: Lücheng Square
- F: Zhengzhou People's Government
- H: Bishagang Park
- J: Bishagang Park
- K: Lücheng Square

== Future development ==
The station is planned to be a three-line interchange station among Line 1, Line 9 and Line 10. The Line 9 is currently under planning.

== Surroundings ==
- Lücheng Square
- Bishagang Park (south entrance)
- Zhengzhou University (old campus)
- Zhengzhou Children's Palace
- Zhengzhou Municipal People's Government
