= Yixueyuan station =

Metro station in Zhengzhou, China

Yixueyuan 医学院
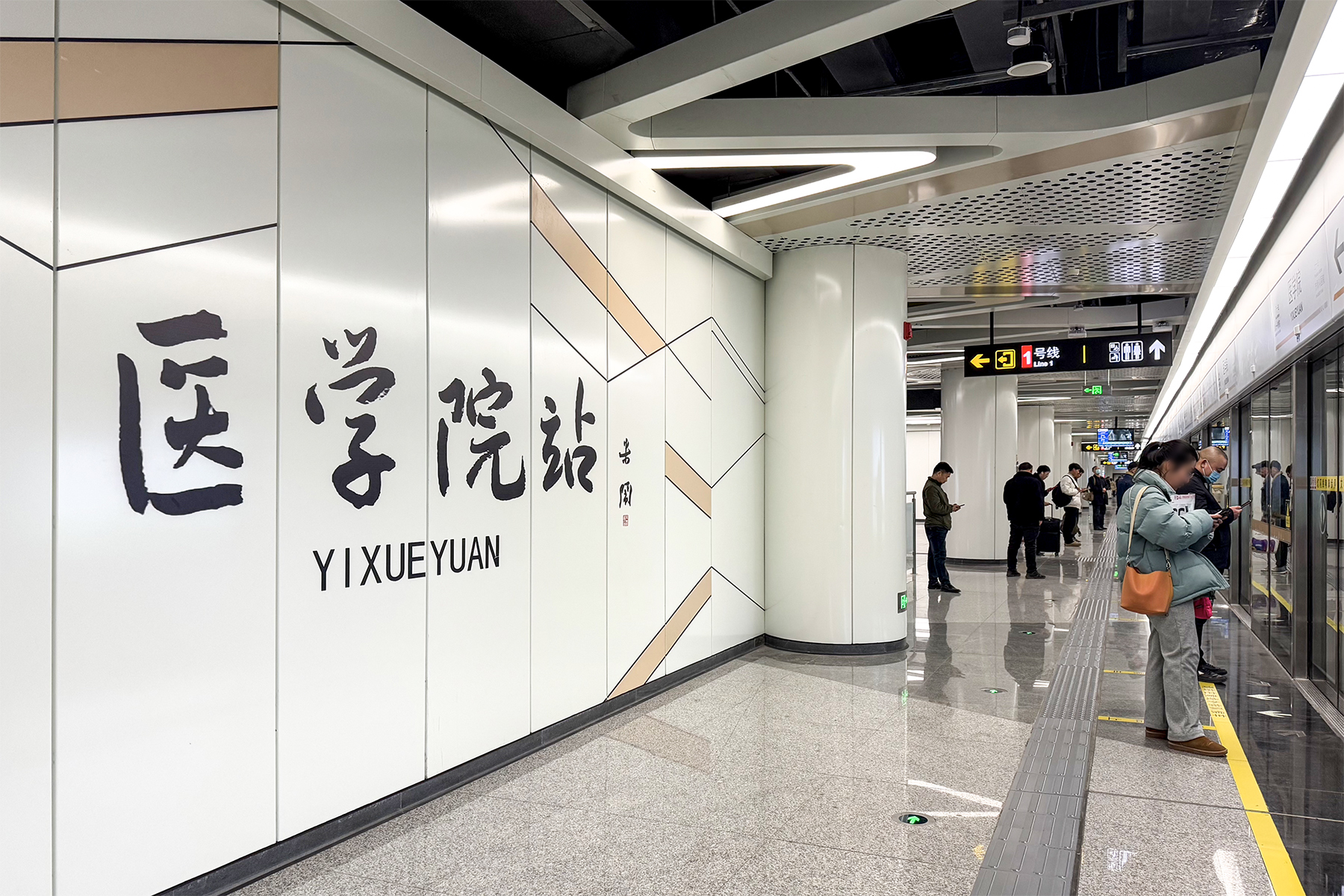
- Platform of Line 7

General information
- Location: Zhongyuan Road × Daxue Road; Erqi District, Zhengzhou; China
- Coordinates: 34.7487°N 113.6375°E
- System: Zhengzhou Metro rapid transit station
- Operator: Zhengzhou Metro
- Lines: Line 1; Line 7; Line 10
- Platforms: 6 (3 island platforms)
- Connections: Bus

Construction
- Structure type: Underground

History
- Opened: 28 December 2013

Services
Preceding station	Zhengzhou Metro	Following station
Lucheng Guangchang towards Henan University of Technology	Line 1	Zhengzhou Railway Station towards New Campus of Henan University
Zhengda Yifuyuan towards Dongzhao	Line 7	Shi Gukeyiyuan towards Nangangliu
Lucheng Guangchang towards Zhengzhouxi Railway Station	Line 10	Zhengzhou Railway Station Terminus
Location

Yixueyuan (simplified Chinese: 医学院; traditional Chinese: 醫學院; pinyin: Yīxuéyuàn; lit. 'Medical College') is a metro station of Line 1, Line 7 and Line 10 of the Zhengzhou Metro. The station lies beneath the crossing of Zhongyuan Road and Daxue Road.

== Station layout ==
The station can be seen as two parts. Part 1 is for line 1 and part 2 is for lines 7 and 10. Passengers can using the transfer passage at B1 floor to go through two concourses.

Part 1 has two floors. B1 floor is a concourse. B2 floor is an island platform with two tracks for line 1.

Part 2 has three floors. B1 floor is the concourse. B2 and B3 floors are platform levels. B2 is for line 10 and B3 is for line 7. Each of them consists of an island platform with two tracks.

Because the interchange between line 1 and line 10 need going through the concourse of line 7, so the station using OSI when line 7 was under construction but line 10 opened.

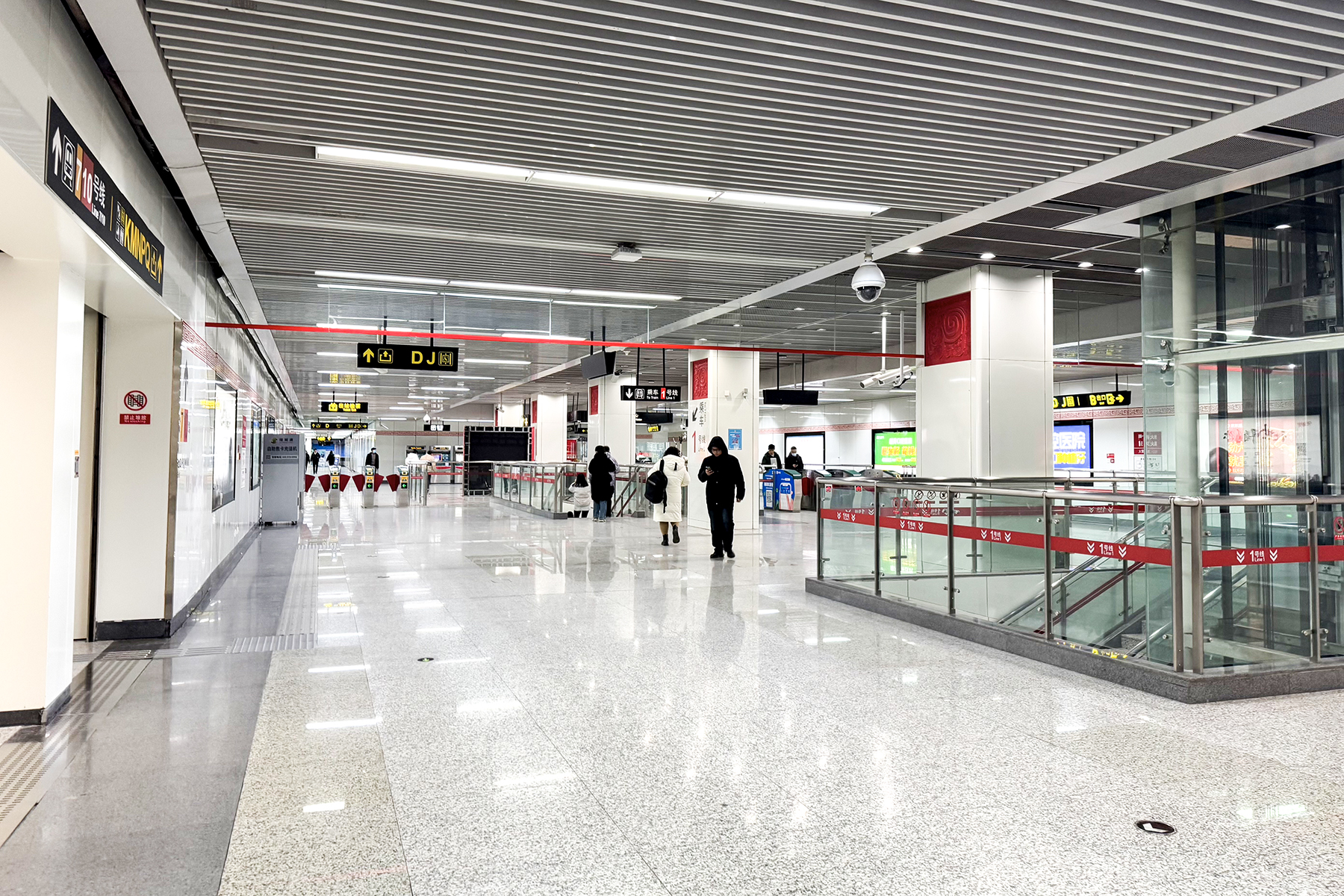
Concourse of Line 1

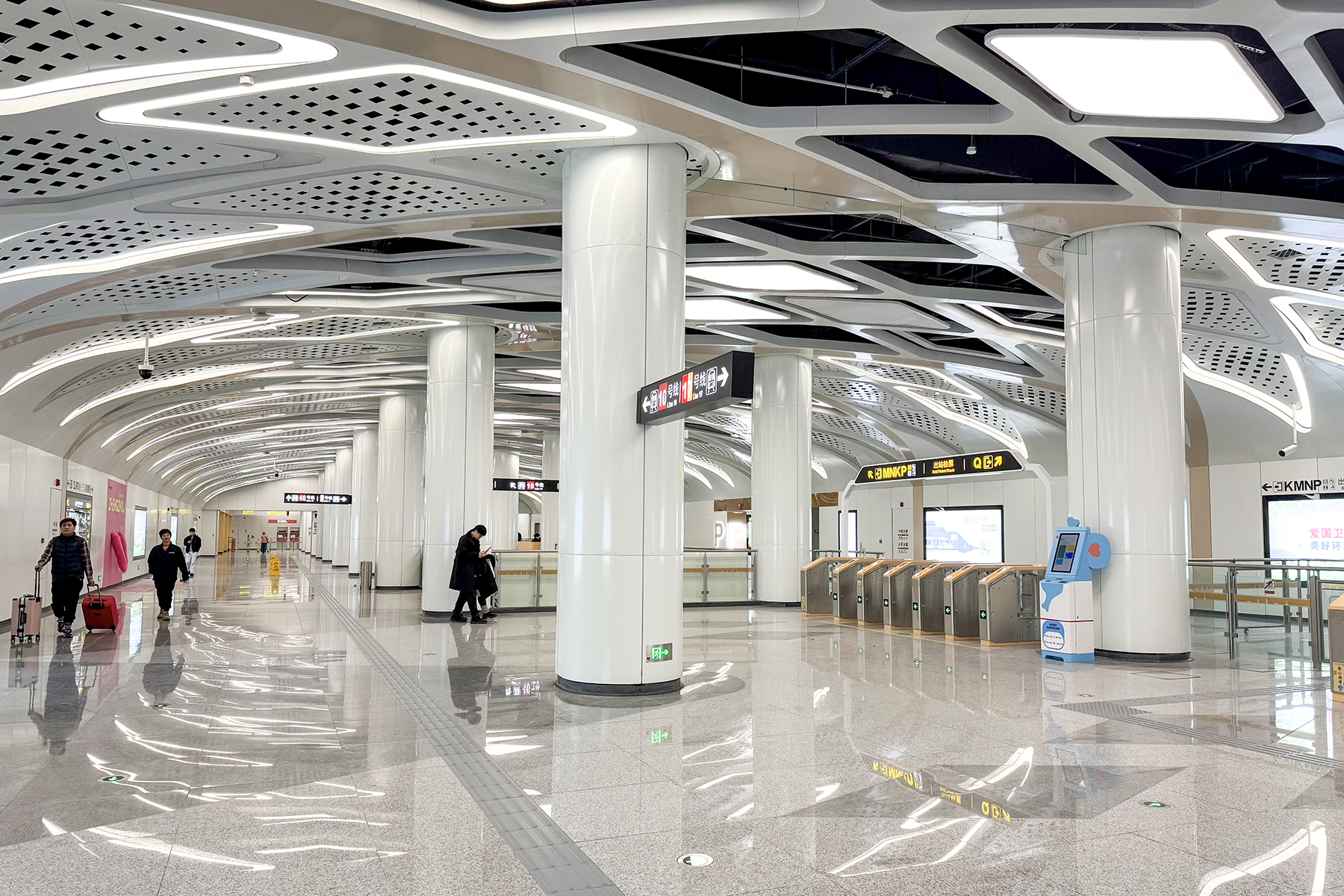
Concourse of Line 7

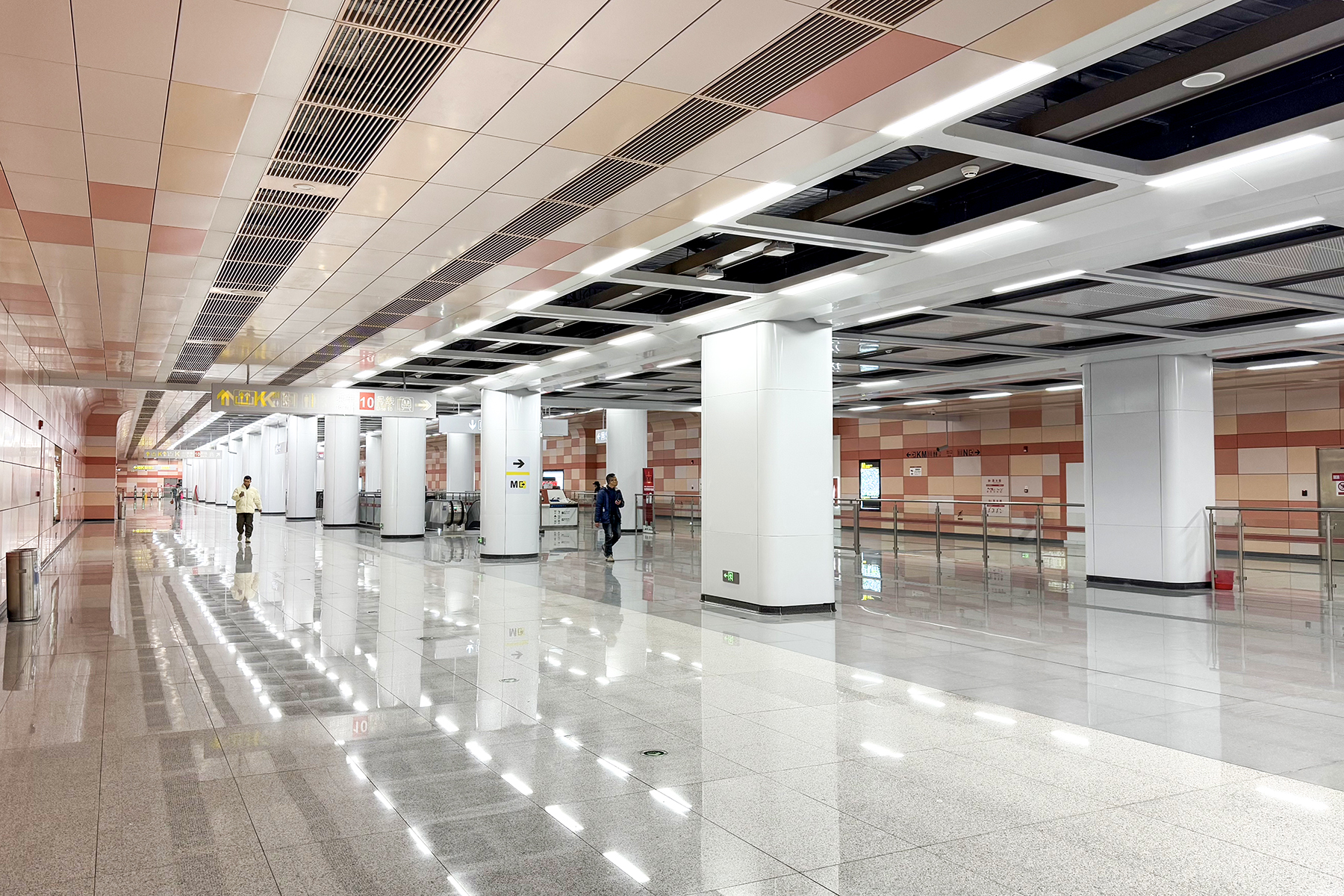
Concourse of Line 10

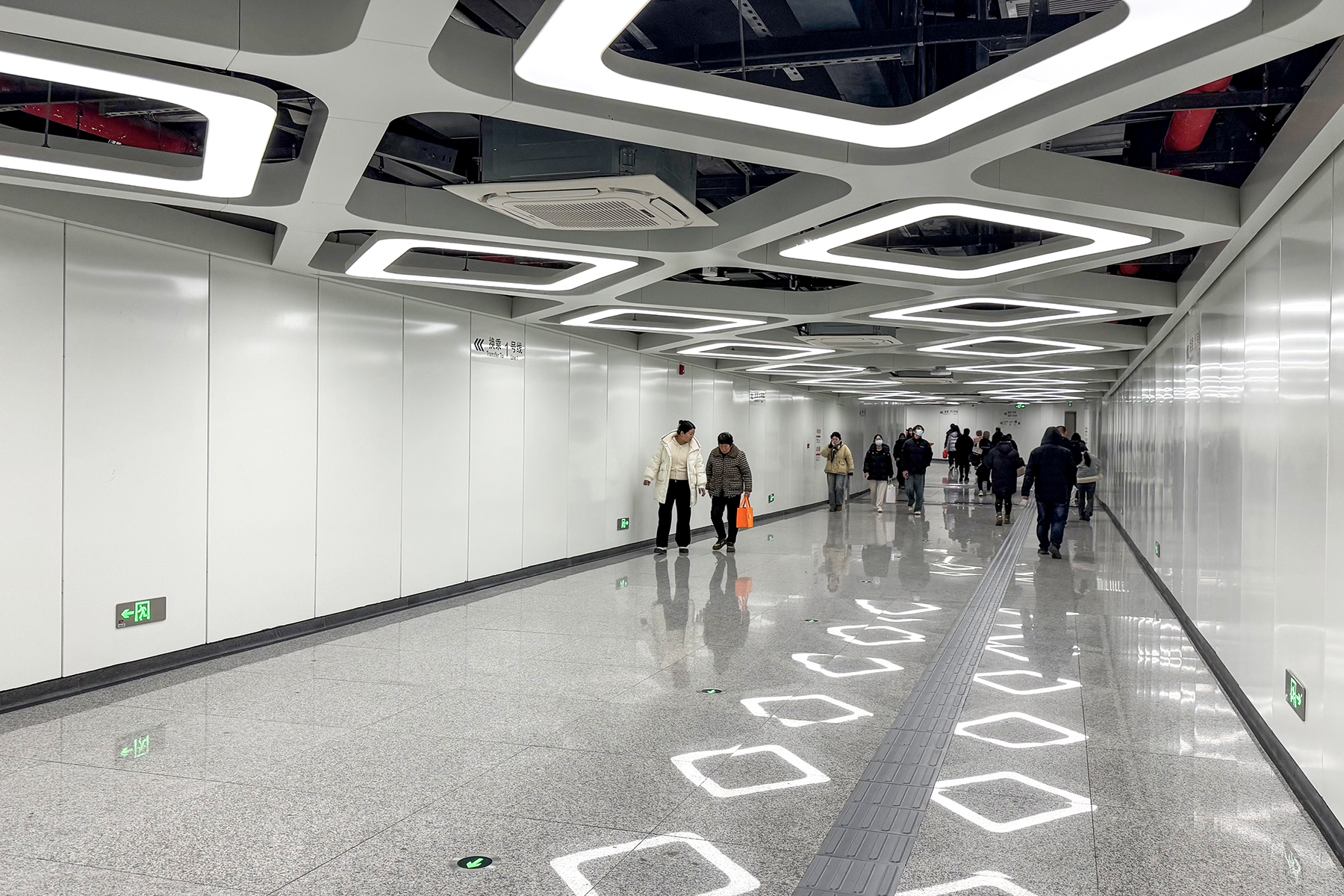
Transfer passage between Lines 1 and 7

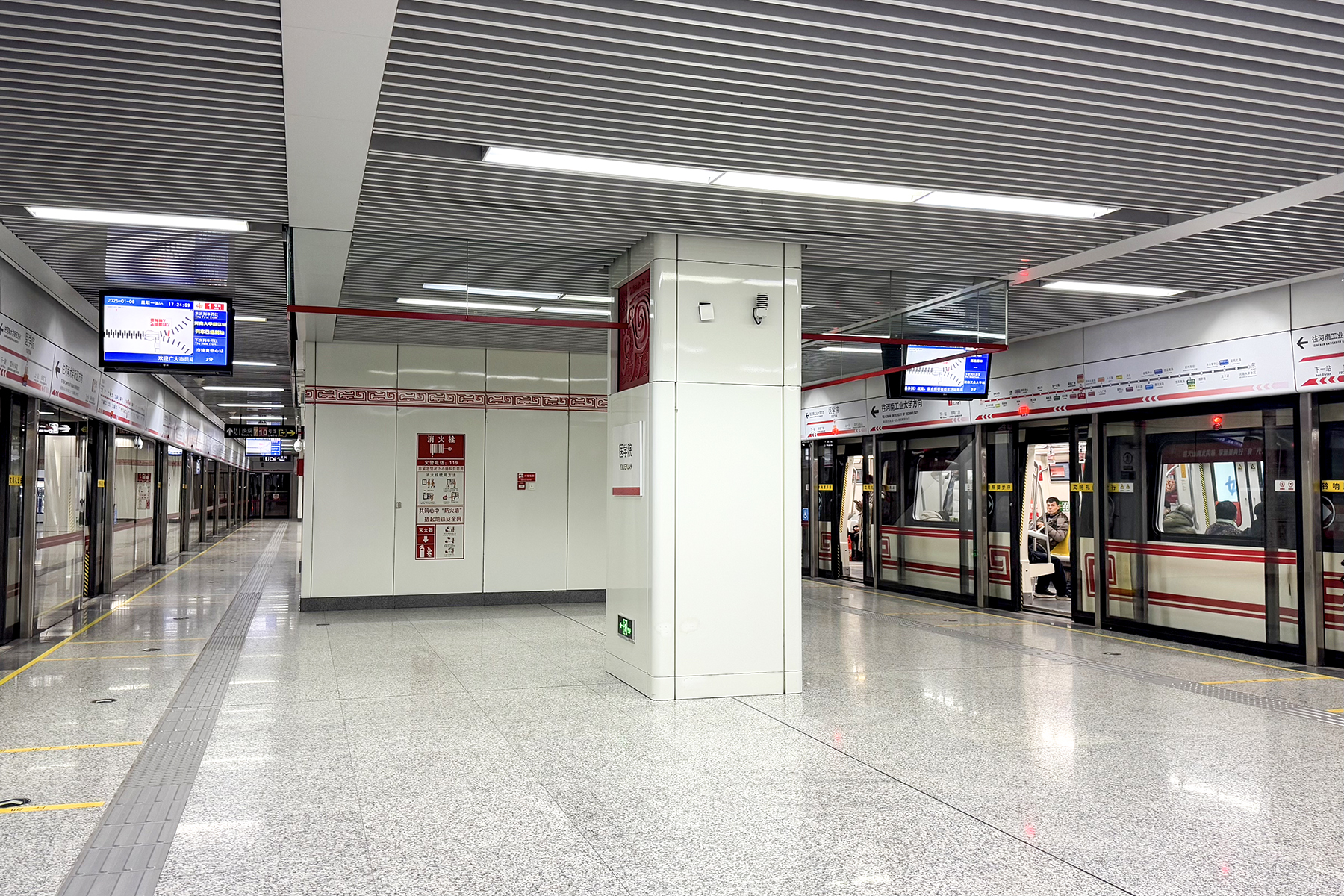
Platforms of Line 1

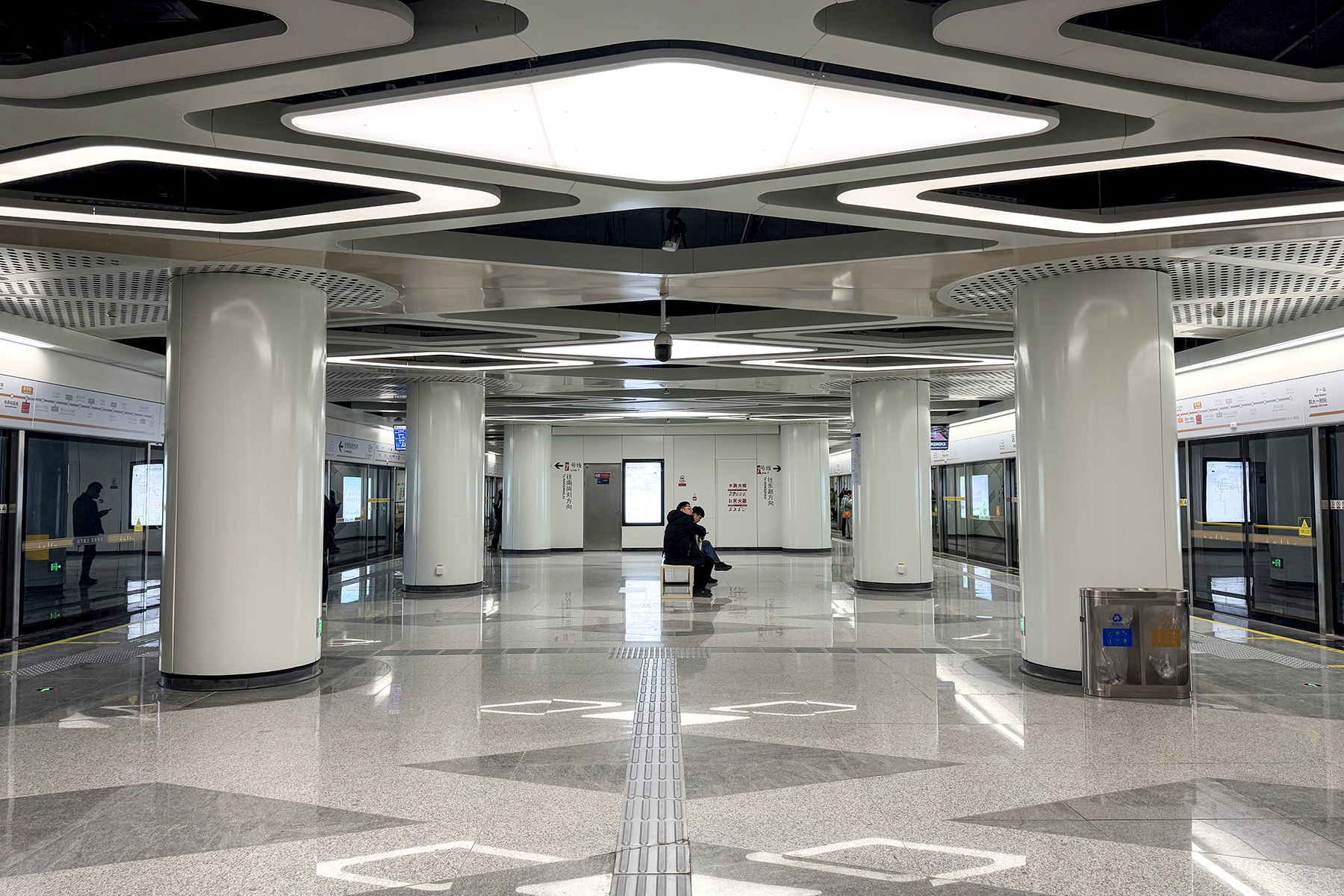
Platforms of Line 7

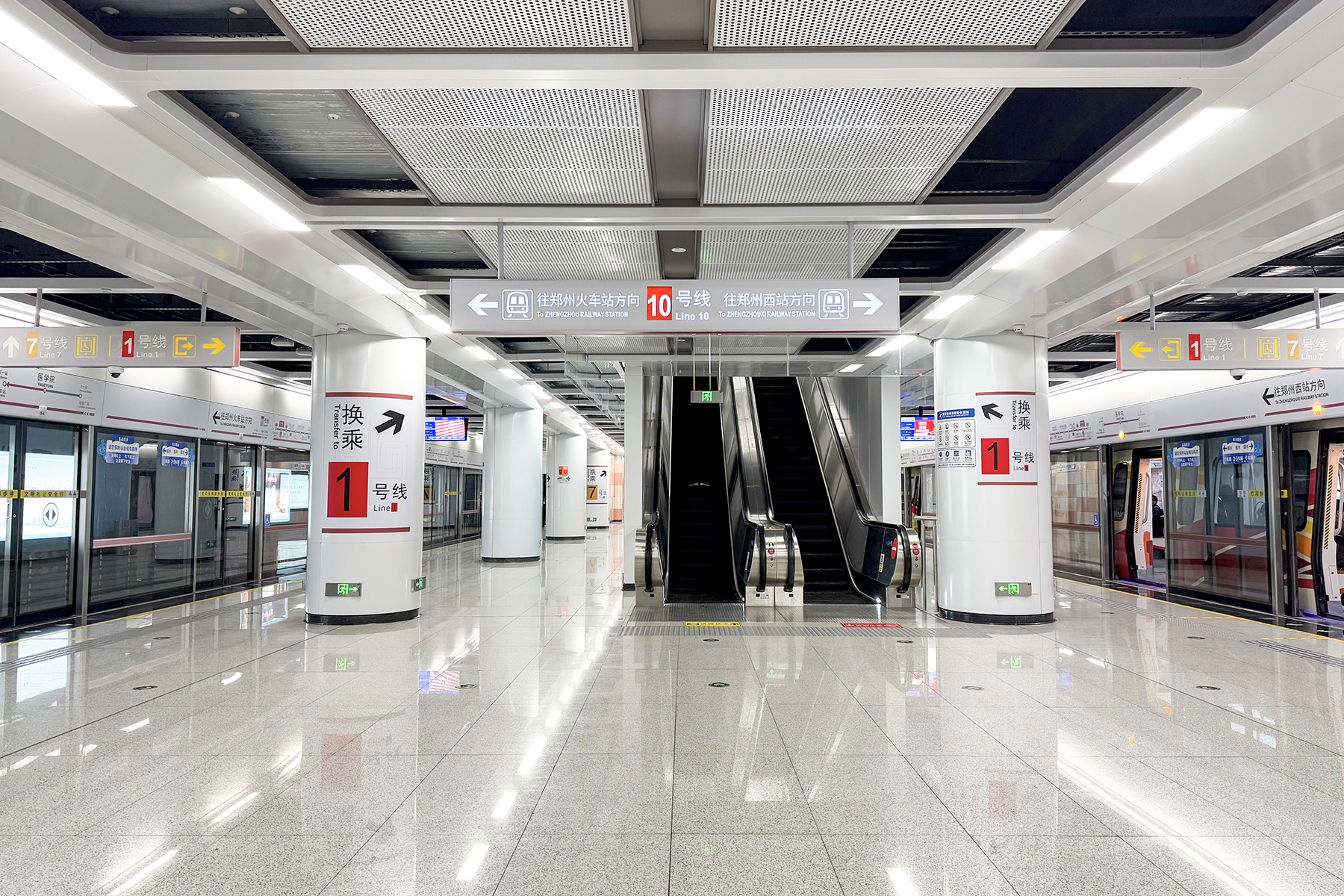
Platforms of Line 10

=== Entrances/exits ===
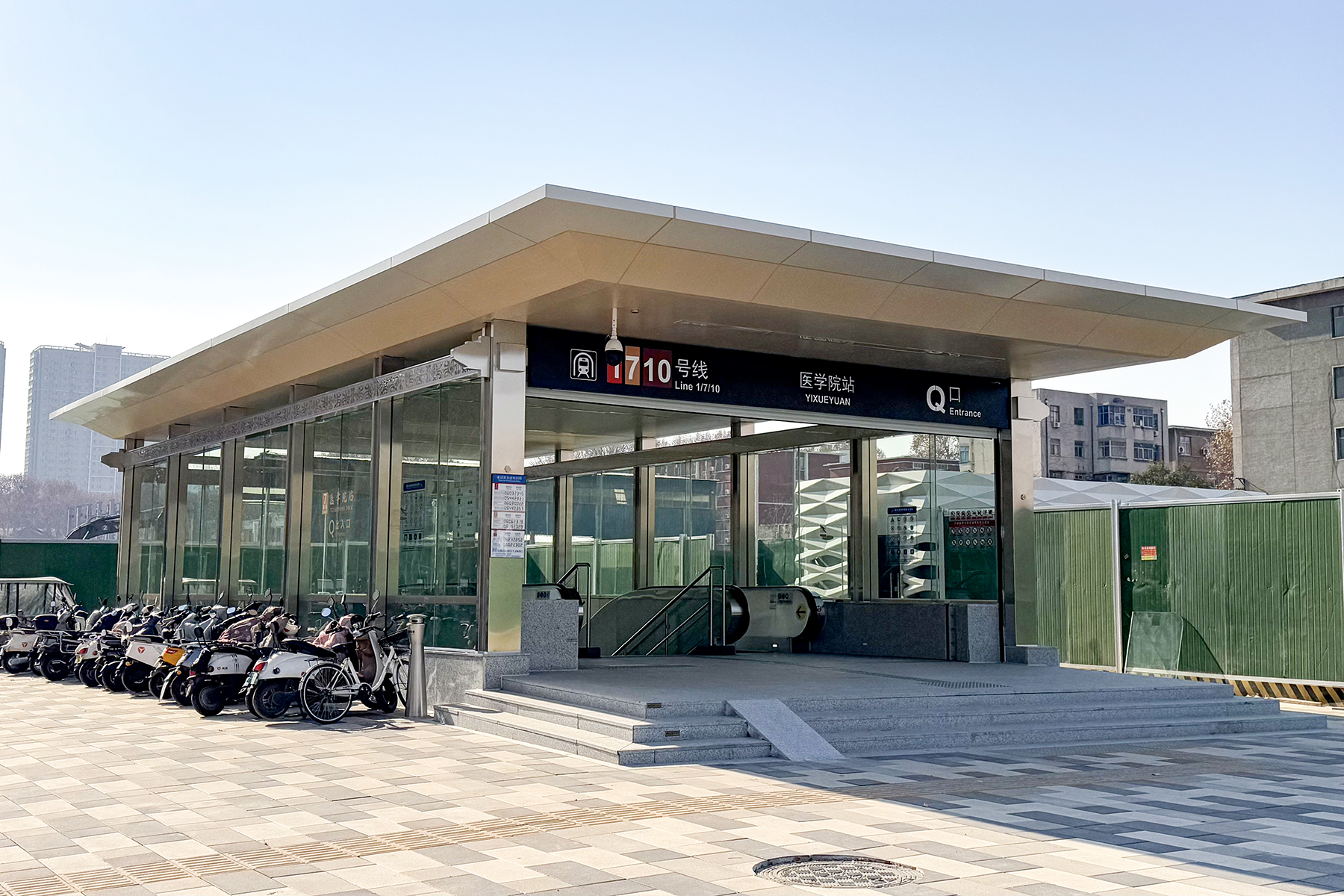
Entrance Q

Yixueyuan has eight exits in use. Exits B, D and J connect Line 1, exits K, M and N connect Line 10 and exits P and Q connect Line 7.

- B: Daxue North Road (east side)
- D: Zhongyuan East Road (south side)
- J: Zhongyuan East Road (north side)
- K: Kangfu Back Street
- M: Daxue North Road (east side)
- N: Daxue North Road (west side)
- P: Daxue North Road (west side)
- Q: Duizhou Beili

== Surroundings ==
- Zhengzhou University Medical College
- Zhengzhou University (old campus)
- First Affiliated Hospital of Zhengzhou University
