= Putianxi station =

Putianxi station may refer to:

- Putianxi station (Zhengzhou Metro), a station on Line 3 (Zhengzhou Metro).
- Putian West railway station, officially translated as "Putianxi railway station", a station on Longhai railway.
