= Gongyi railway station =

Station on the Longhai railway in Gongyi, Zhengzhou, Henan

Gongyi 巩义
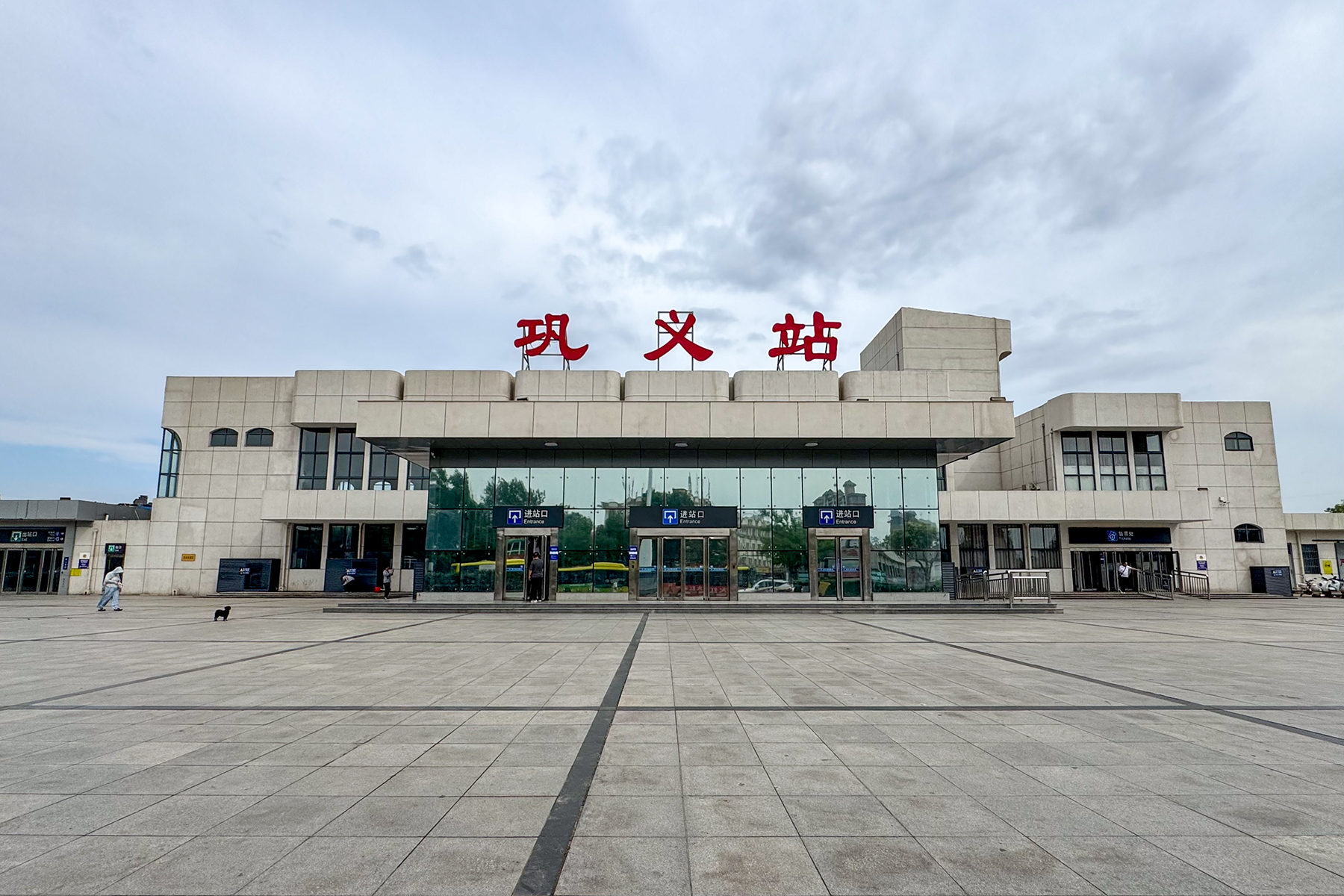

General information
- Location: 1 Guangming Road; Gongyi, Zhengzhou, Henan; China
- Coordinates: 34.7611°N 112.9755°E
- Operator: CR Zhengzhou
- Line: Longhai railway
- Platforms: 3
- Tracks: 11
- Connections: Bus terminal

Other information
- Station code: 39101 (TMIS code); GXF (telegraph code); GYI (Pinyin code)
- Classification: Class 2 station (二等站)

History
- Opened: 1908
- Former names: Gong County or Gongxian (Chinese: 巩县)

Services
Preceding station	China Railway	Following station
Zhengzhou towards Lianyungang East	Longhai railway	Yanshi towards Lanzhou
Location
- Location within Zhengzhou Location within Henan Location within China

Gongyi railway station (Chinese: 巩义站) is a station on the Longhai railway in Gongyi, Zhengzhou, Henan.

== History ==
The station was established in 1908 together with the Kaifeng-Luoyang section of Longhai railway.

== See also ==
- Gongyi South railway station
