= Line 10 (Zhengzhou Metro) =

Metro line in Zhengzhou, China

- 10
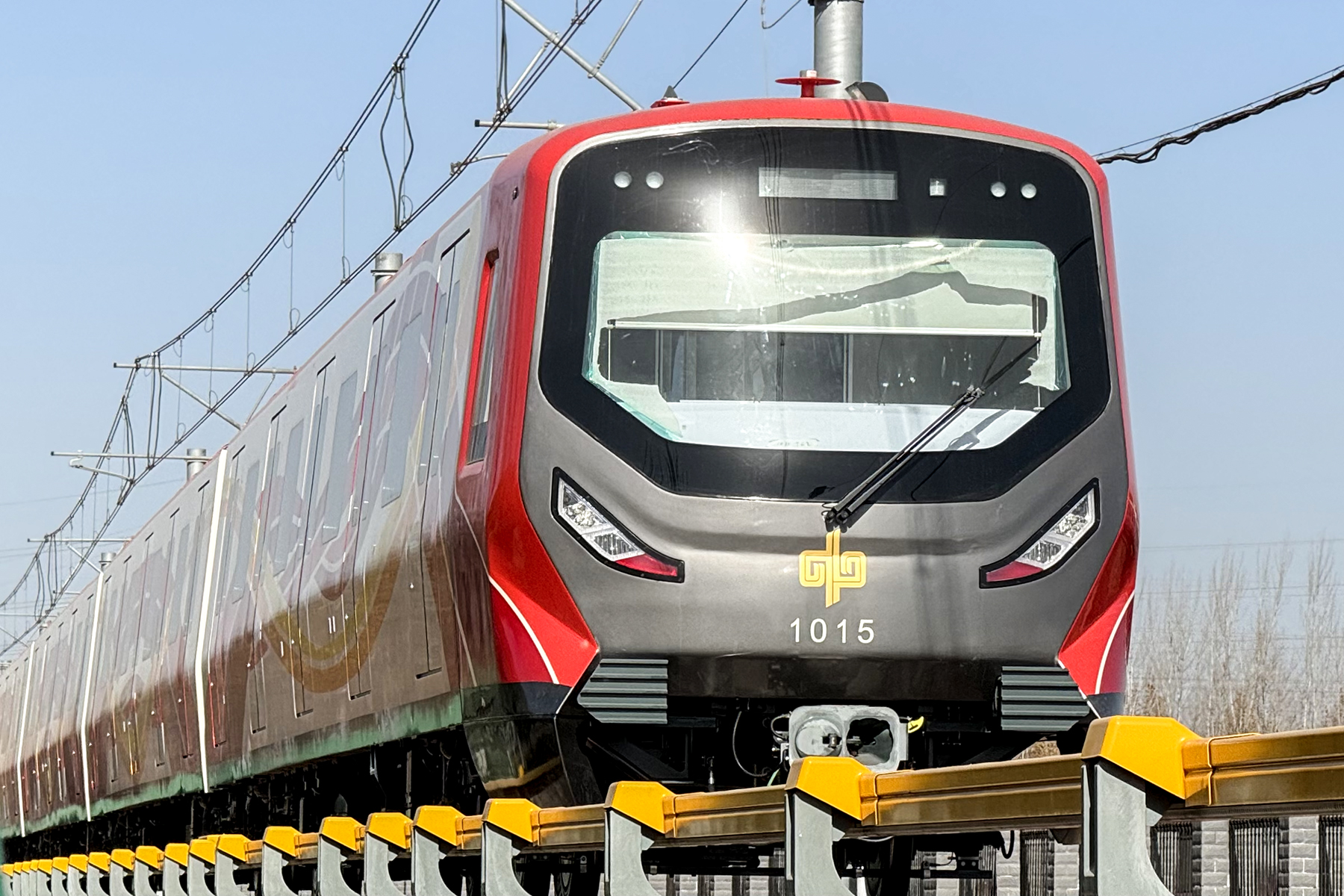
- A train of Zhengzhou Metro Line 10

Overview
- Status: Operational
- Locale: Zhengzhou, Henan Province, China
- Termini: Zhengzhouxi Railway Station; Zhengzhou Railway Station

Service
- Type: Rapid transit
- System: Zhengzhou Metro

History
- Opened: 28 September 2023; 17 months ago

Technical
- Line length: 21.849 km (13.6 mi)
- Number of tracks: 2
- Character: Underground
- Track gauge: 1,435 mm (4 ft 8 1/2 in)

Line 10 of the Zhengzhou Metro (Chinese: 郑州地铁10号线) is a rapid transit line in Zhengzhou, Henan Province, China. Phase 1 of Line 10 is 21.849 km (13.6 mi) long with 12 stations.

== Stations (Phase 1) ==
Station name		Connections	Location
English	Chinese	Connections	Location
Shangjie Airport	上街机场		Shangjie
Shangjiezhonglü	上街中铝		Shangjie
Xiawo	峡窝		Shangjie
Shiminfuwuzhongxin	市民服务中心		Shangjie
Jinhualu	金华路		Shangjie
Yangdong	杨垌		Xingyang
Xingyangerzhong	荥阳二中		Xingyang
Qilingyi	七零一		Xingyang
Xingyangzhiwuyuan	荥阳植物园		Xingyang
Shangyejie	商业街		Xingyang
Zhengzhouxi Railway Station	郑州西站		Xingyang
Lishangyin Gongyuan	李商隐公园		Xingyang
Miaowang	庙王		Zhongyuan
Liuhu	柳湖		Zhongyuan
Shiwei Dangxiao	市委党校	14	Zhongyuan
Zhengzhou Yizhong	郑州一中		Zhongyuan
Xiliuhu Gongyuan Nan	西流湖公园南		Zhongyuan
Ersha	二砂		Zhongyuan
Zhengzhou Central Hospital	市中心医院	5	Zhongyuan
Lüchengguangchang	绿城广场	1	Erqi
Yixueyuan	医学院	1 7	Erqi
Zhengzhou Railway Station	郑州火车站	1	Erqi

== History ==
Phase 1 of Line 10, from Zhengzhouxi Railway Station to Zhengzhou Railway Station, was approved by NDRC on 29 March 2019 and opened on 28 September 2023.

== Future development ==
An extension from Zhengzhouxi Railway Station to Zhengzhou Shangjie Airport (in Shangjie District of Zhengzhou) is under planning. As of March 27, 2025, the extension has not been approved by the NDRC.
