= Gongyi South railway station =

Railway station in Gongyi, China

Gongyi South 巩义南
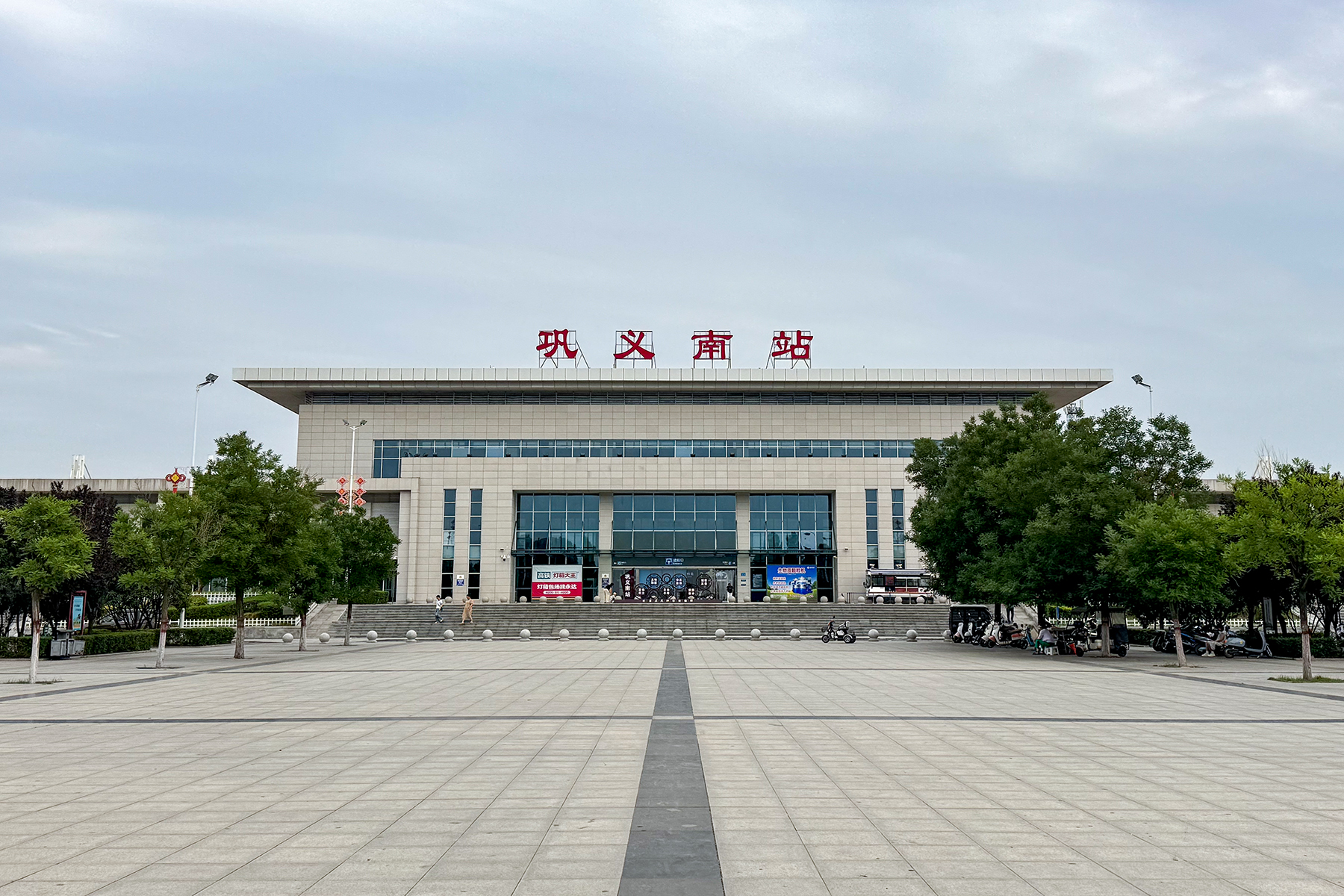

General information
- Other names: Gongyinan
- Location: Huiguo Town, Gongyi, Zhengzhou, Henan; China
- Coordinates: 34.6720°N 112.9107°E
- Operator: CR Zhengzhou
- Line: Xuzhou–Lanzhou High-Speed Railway
- Platforms: 2
- Tracks: 4
- Connections: Bus terminal

Other information
- Station code: 39056 (TMIS code); GYF (telegraph code); GYN (Pinyin code)
- Classification: 3rd class station

History
- Opened: 6 February 2010
Location
- Location within Zhengzhou Location within Henan

Gongyi South railway station (Chinese: 巩义南站) is a railway station on the Xuzhou–Lanzhou high-speed railway located in Gongyi, Zhengzhou, Henan, China. It was opened on 6 February 2010, along with the Zhengzhou–Xi'an high-speed railway.

Preceding station	China Railway High-speed	Following station
Zhengzhou West towards Zhengzhou	Zhengzhou–Xi'an high-speed railway Part of the Eurasia Continental Bridge corridor	Luoyang Longmen towards Xi'an North
