= Line 7 (Zhengzhou Metro) =

Metro line in Zhengzhou, China

- 7
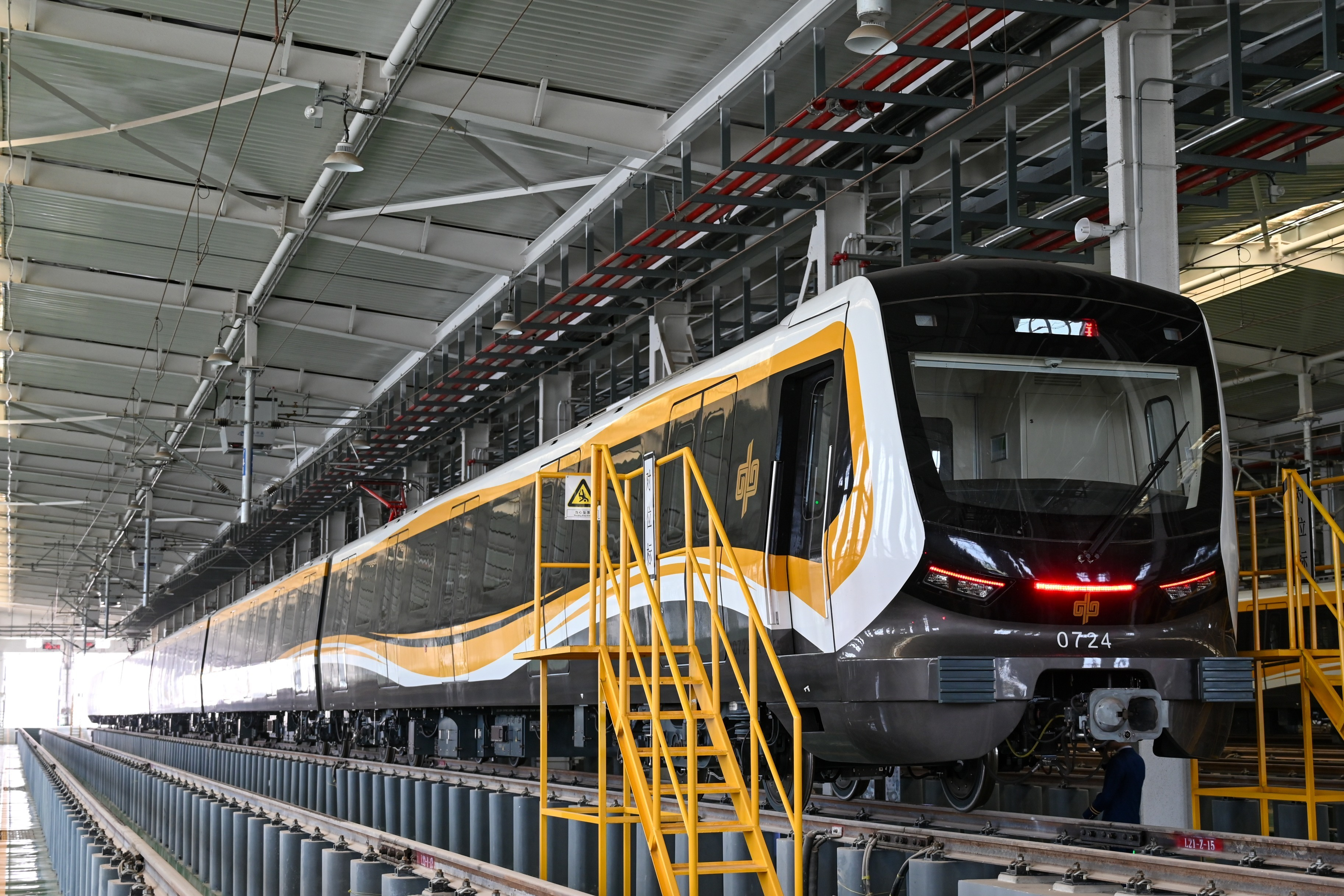
- A train of Line 7 at depot

Overview
- Status: In operation
- Owner: Zhengzhou
- Locale: Zhengzhou, Henan, China
- Termini: Dongzhao (Note: (Future: Huanghe Bolanguan)); Nangangliu
- Stations: 21 (1 under planning)

Service
- Type: Rapid transit
- System: Zhengzhou Metro
- Operator(s): Zhengzhou Metro Group Corporation

History
- Opened: 29 December 2024; 13 months ago

Technical
- Line length: 26.8 km (16.65 mi)
- Number of tracks: 2
- Character: Underground
- Track gauge: 1,435 mm (4 ft 8 1/2 in)
- Electrification: Overhead lines (1500 volts)

Line 7 of Zhengzhou Metro (Chinese: 郑州地铁7号线; pinyin: Zhèngzhōu Dìtiě Qīhào Xiàn) is a rapid transit line in Zhengzhou that runs in a north - south direction. The line uses six car Type A trains. The line opened on 29 December 2024.

== Opening timeline ==
Segment	Commencement	Length	Station(s)	Name
Dongzhao - Nangangliu	29 December 2024	26.8 km (16.7 mi)	20	Phase 1
Huanghe Bolanguan - Dongzhao	TBD	2.5 km (1.6 mi)	1	Northern extension

== Stations ==
Station No.	Station name		Connections	Distance km	Location
Station No.	English	Chinese	Connections	Distance km	Location
0701	Huanghe Bolanguan	黄河博览馆			Huiji
0702	Dongzhao	东赵			Huiji
0703	Huanghe Yingbinguan	黄河迎宾馆	2		Huiji
0704	Bei Daxuecheng	北大学城			Huiji
0705	Liulisi	琉璃寺			Jinshui
0706	Zhangjiacun	张家村	4		Jinshui
0707	Chenzhai	陈砦			Jinshui
0708	Baimiao	白庙	8		Jinshui
0709	Nongye Daxue	农业大学			Jinshui
0710	Zhengzhou People's Hospital	郑州人民医院	5		Jinshui
0711	Dashiqiao	大石桥	3		Jinshui
0712	Zhengda Yifuyuan	郑大一附院			Erqi
0713	Yixueyuan	医学院	1 10		Erqi
0714	Shi Guke Yiyuan	市骨科医院			Erqi
0715	Daxue Zhonglu	大学中路	6		Erqi
0716	Shi Dier Renminyiyuan	市第二人民医院	5		Erqi
0717	Wanghuzhai	王胡砦			Erqi
0718	Lijiang Lu	漓江路			Erqi
0719	Jinghu	荆胡			Erqi
0720	Nanhuan Gongyuan	南环公园			Erqi
0721	Nangangliu	南岗刘			Erqi
