= Lücheng Square =

Square in Zhengzhou, China

- Interactive map of Lücheng Square
- Location: Zhengzhou, Henan, China

Lücheng Square is a square within Zhengzhou, China, and is the main cultural square within the city.
