= Putian West railway station =

Railway station in Guancheng Hui District, People's Republic of China

Putianxi 圃田西
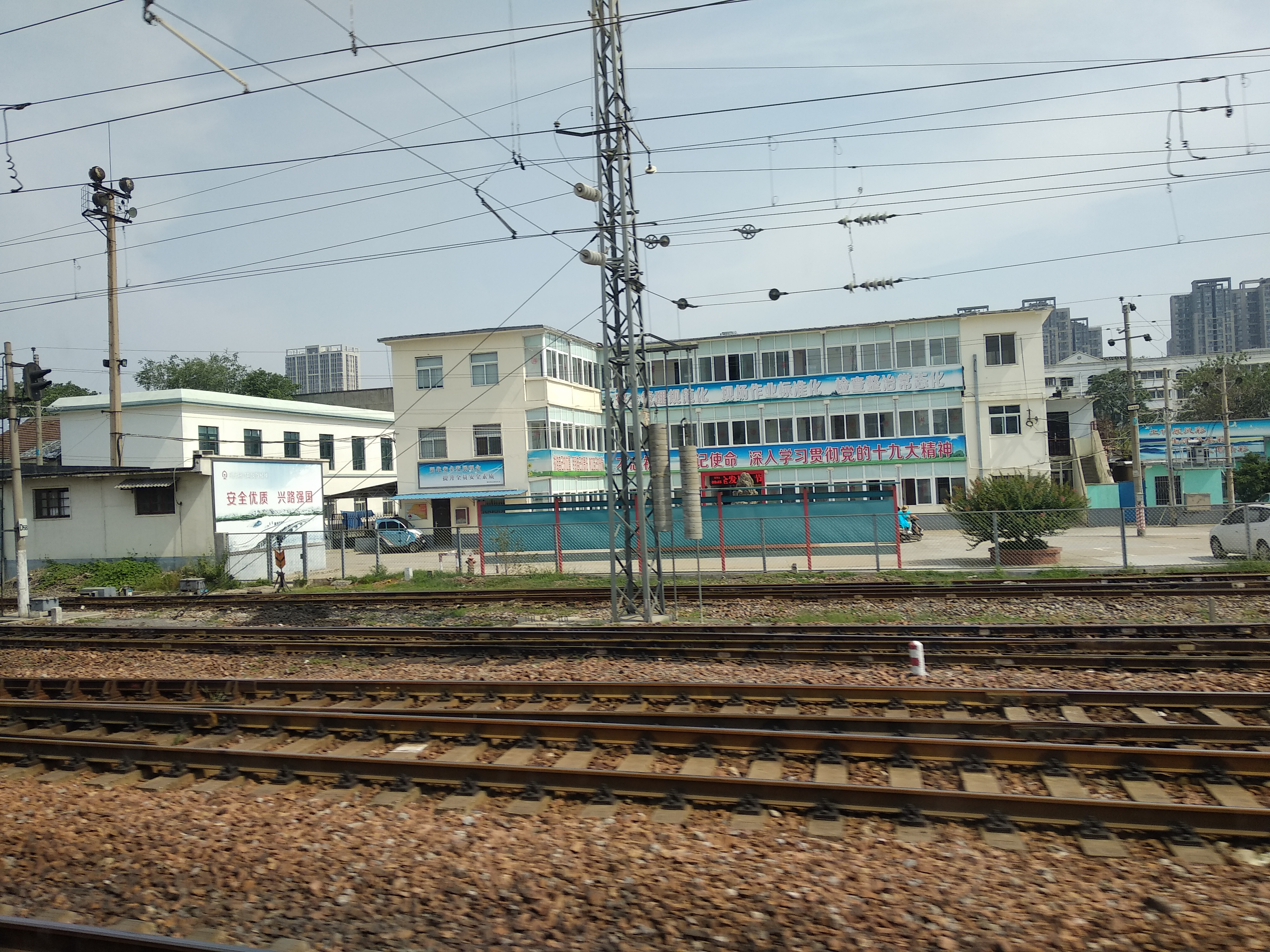

General information
- Location: 142 Huozhan Street; Guancheng Hui District, Zhengzhou, Henan; China
- Coordinates: 34.735002°N 113.699562°E
- Operator: CR Zhengzhou
- Line: Longhai railway

Other information
- Station code: 38810 (TMIS code); ZDF (telegraph code); PTX (Pinyin code)
- Classification: Top Class station (特等站)

History
- Opened: 1953
- Former names: Zhengzhoudong (Chinese: 郑州东)
Location
- Location within Zhengzhou Location within Henan Location within China

Putianxi (Putian West) railway station (Chinese: 圃田西站) is a goods station in Guancheng Hui District, Zhengzhou, Henan. Located on the Longhai Railway, the station is one of the largest freight train stations in China.

== History ==
The station was established in 1953 as Zhengzhoudong railway station (Chinese: 郑州东站) when the freight yard of Zhengzhou railway station was separated from it.

In 2011, since the high-speed railway station in Zhengzhou on the Beijing–Guangzhou–Shenzhen–Hong Kong high-speed railway was named as Zhengzhoudong, this station was renamed to its current name to avoid ambiguity.
