= Zhengzhou railway station =

Railway station in Zhengzhou, China

Zhengzhou 郑州
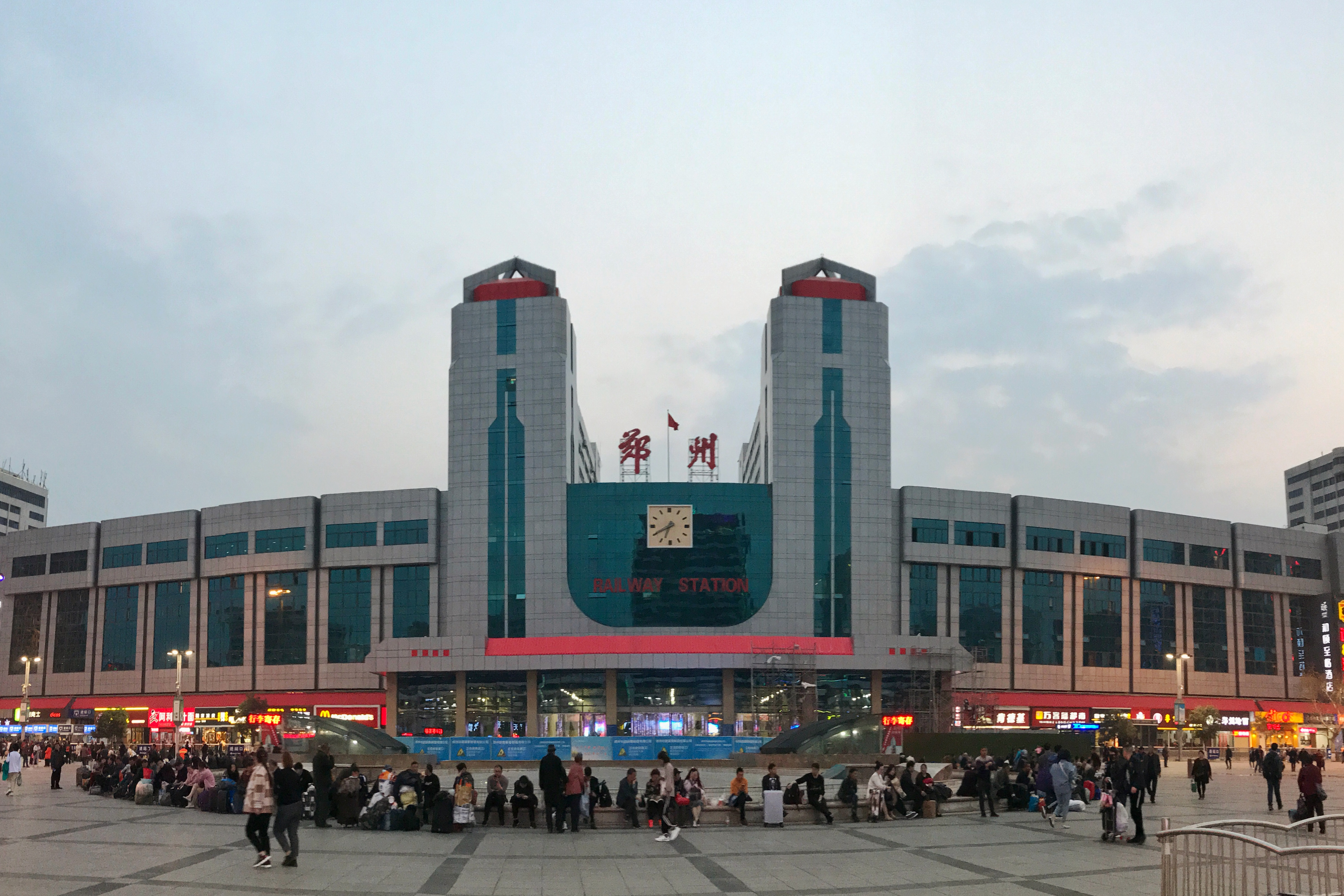
- East station building

Chinese name
- Simplified Chinese: 郑州站
- Traditional Chinese: 鄭州站
Transcriptions

General information
- Location: 82 Erma Road; Erqi District, Zhengzhou, Henan; China
- Coordinates: 34.7478°N 113.6540°E
- Operator: China Railway Zhengzhou Group
- Lines: China Railway: Beijing–Guangzhou Railway; Longhai Railway; China Railway High-speed: Zhengzhou–Jiaozuo Intercity Railway; Zhengzhou–Xi'an High-Speed Railway
- Platforms: 13 (1 side platform and 6 island platforms)
- Tracks: 16
- Connections: 1 10 Zhengzhou Railway Station; Bus terminals

Other information
- Station code: 20750 (TMIS code); ZZF (telegraph code); ZZH (Pinyin code)
- Classification: Top Class station (特等站)

History
- Opened: 1904; 122 years ago
- Electrified: 1991; 35 years ago
- Former names: Zhengxian (Zheng County) (Chinese: 郑县)

Key dates
- 1992-01-26: Elevated waiting halls completed
- 1999-12-28: East station building rebuilt
- 2010-01-30: West station building completed
- 2010-02-06: Zhengzhou–Xi'an high-speed railway opened
- 2015-06-26: Zhengzhou–Jiaozuo intercity railway opened

Services
Preceding station	China Railway High-speed	Following station
Terminus	Zhengzhou–Xi'an high-speed railway Part of the Eurasia Continental Bridge corridor	Zhengzhou West towards Xi'an North
Terminus	Zhengzhou–Jiaozuo intercity railway	Nanyangzhai towards Jiaozuo
Preceding station	China Railway	Following station
Shijiazhuang towards Beijing West	Beijing–Nanning–Hanoi	Wuchang towards Gia Lâm
Xinxiang towards Beijing or Beijing West	Beijing–Guangzhou railway	Changge towards Guangzhou
Kaifeng towards Lianyungang East	Longhai railway	Gongyi towards Lanzhou
Location
- Location within Zhengzhou Location within Henan Location within China

Zhengzhou railway station (simplified Chinese: 郑州站; traditional Chinese: 鄭州站; pinyin: Zhèngzhōu zhàn) is a passenger railway station in Erqi District, Zhengzhou, Henan. It is located in the city center, about 1 km southwest to the Erqi Memorial Tower. As the junction of the important Beijing-Guangzhou Railway and Longhai Railway, the station is one of the busiest in China, and is called as "the heart of Chinese railway network".

== History ==
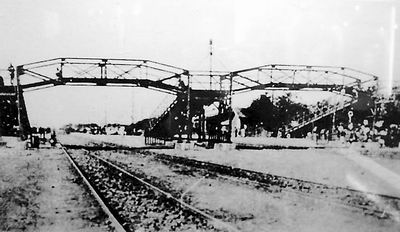
The station in 1911

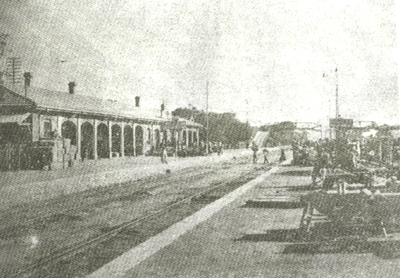
The station in 1923

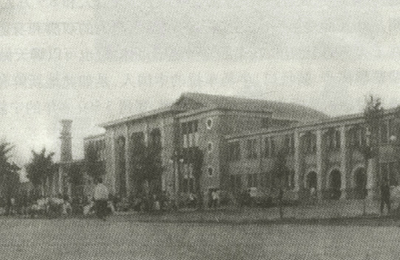
The station in 1954

Opened in 1904, it was a station on the Beijing-Hankou Railway (now part of Beijing-Guangzhou Railway). At the beginning, the station had only one platform and four tracks. In 1908, the Kaifeng-Luoyang Railway (now part of Longhai Railway) was put into operation, making the station an important railway junction.

In 1913, the station was renamed as Zheng County railway station (Chinese: 郑县站). Ticket offices and platform canopies were put into use in 1928 and the freight yard was constructed in 1932.

During the Second Sino-Japanese War, the station was severely damaged due to air strike by the Japanese army in February 1938 and the tracks between Zhengzhou and Zhongmu were destroyed in May 1938 by the flood. Services were therefore suspended.

The station was taken over by the PLA in 1948 and the Zhengzhou Railway Administration Bureau was established in March 1949.

In October 1952, Mao Zedong visited the station. He told Teng Daiyuan, the Minister of Railways then, to highly value the pivotal status of the station, and instructed the station to be built as "the largest and the most complete passenger station in the Far East". The station has been expanded several times in the following decades. The freight yard was moved east to Erligang in 1953 to establish a new freight station and the marshalling yard was separated from the station in 1962 to form the current Zhengzhou North railway station. The station has become a dedicated passenger station since then. The main station building was completed in 1959, and canopies were added to the platforms in 1970s.

In 1987, a major renovation of the station started. The elevated waiting halls were completed and put into use in January 1992. The whole project lasted 12 years and was completed with the opening of the new main station building (current east station building) in 1999.

To relieve the traffic pressure on the east plaza of the station, construction of the west station building and west plaza was started in 2007. The west station building, together with new column-free platform canopies, the 7th and 8th elevated waiting halls and the 7th platform (current Platform 12 and 13) were put into use in 2010.

On 28 December 2013, with the opening of Zhengzhou Metro Line 1, the station began to have metro access on the west entrance.

The Zhengzhou-Jiaozuo Intercity Railway commenced operation in 2015, making the station an integrated railway hub with conventional long distance, high-speed and intercity train services.

== Station layout ==
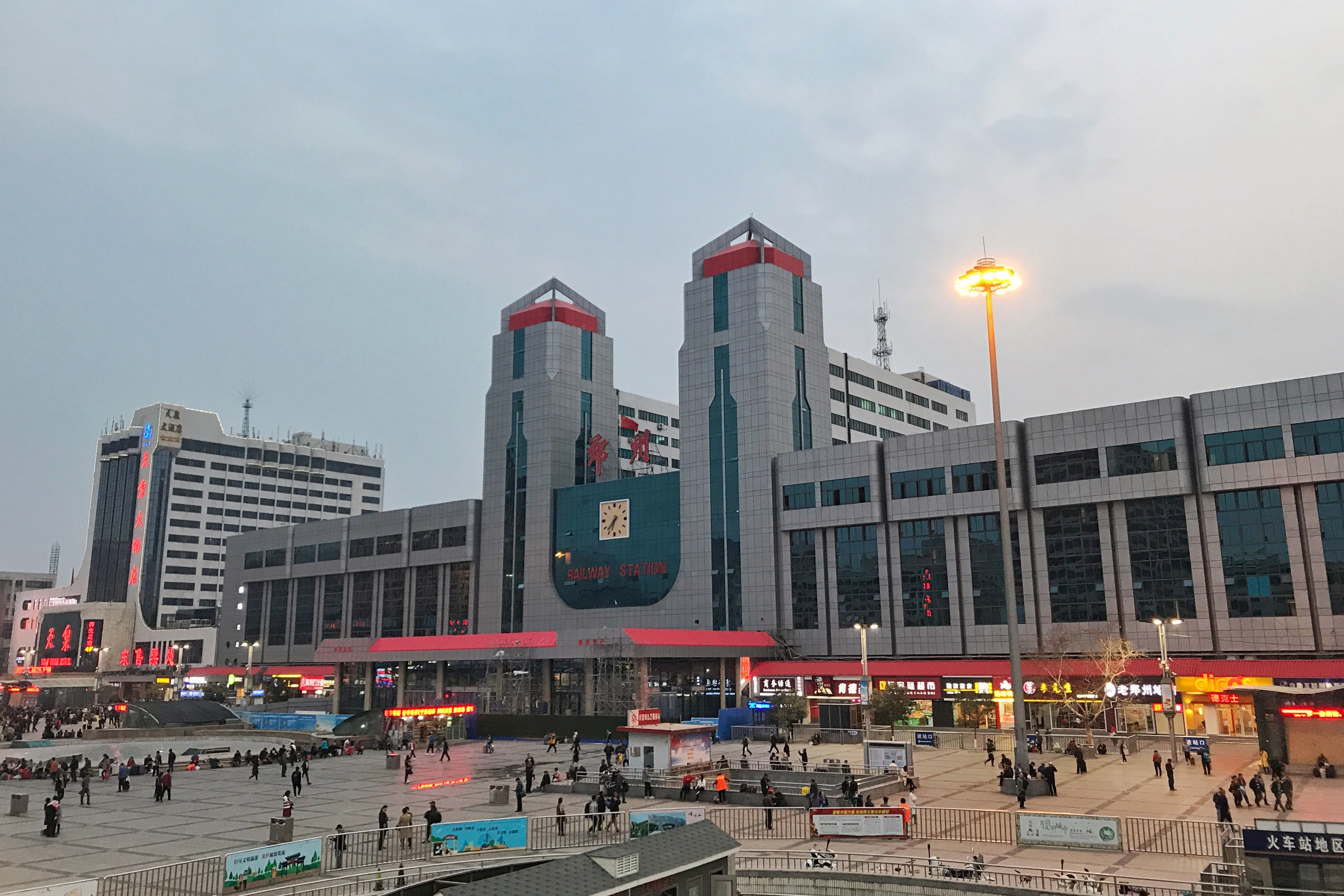
East plaza of the station

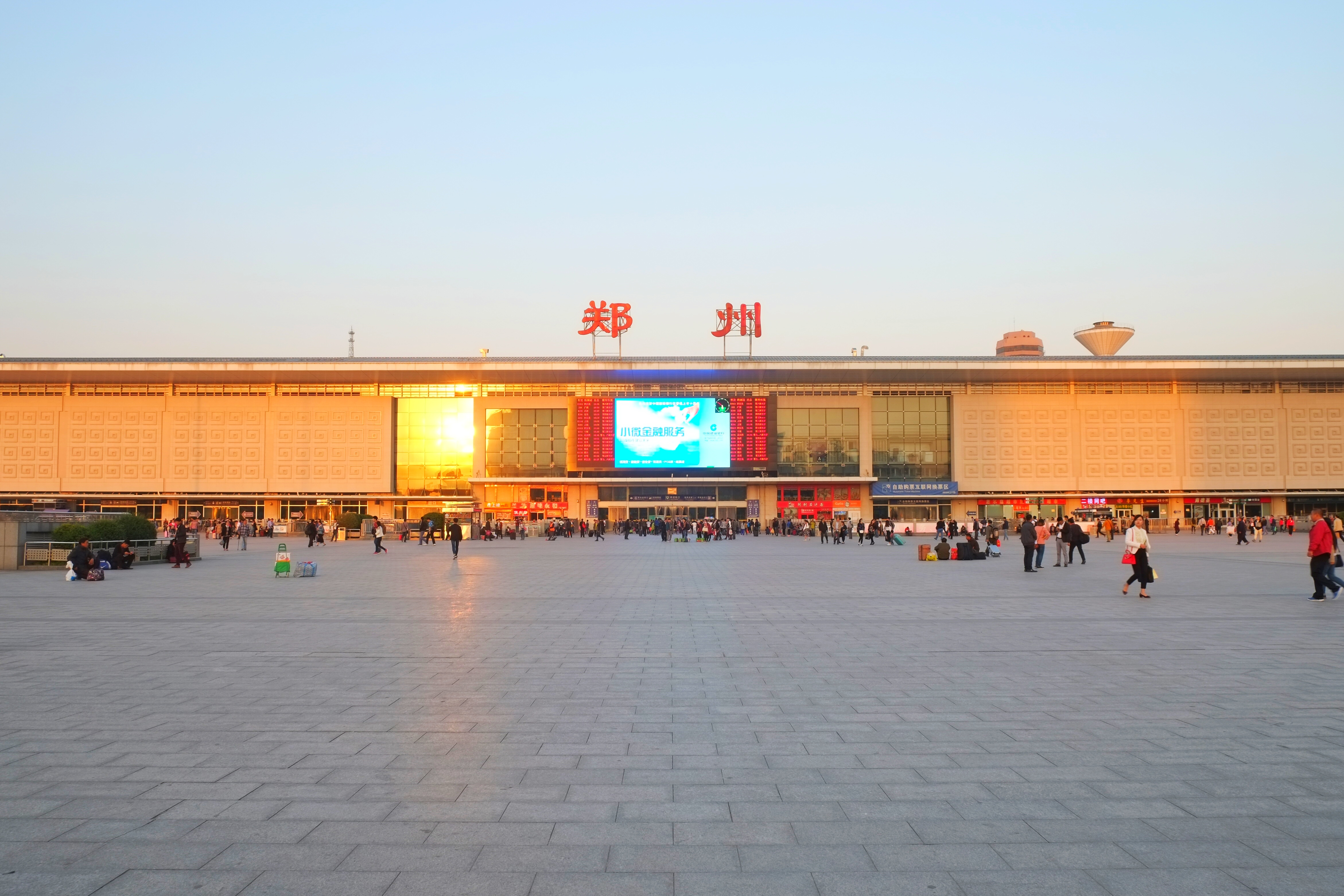
The west station building

The station has two station buildings on both east and west side, covering an area of 144,000 square metres (1,550,000 sq ft) in total together with waiting rooms. The two station buildings are connected by a channel for departing passengers with 10 waiting rooms on both sides of it at 2nd level, and two tunnels for passengers on arrival.

=== East station building ===
The east station building is also called the main station building. It is 63.3 metres (208 ft) in height with an area of over 40,000 square metres (430,000 sq ft). The ticket office, offering 68 counters, is in the southern part on the 1st level. The main entrance is in the central part on the 1st level, with 4 escalators, 2 elevators and 2 staircases to the elevated waiting rooms on the 2nd level.

=== West station building ===
The west station building is to the west of the platforms. It covers an area of 11,774 square metres (126,730 sq ft), housing ticket counters, restaurants and stores.

=== Platforms and tracks ===
The station has 13 platforms and 20 tracks, of which 13 are for corresponding platforms, 3 are run-around loops and 4 are for freight trains passing the station. There is no through track for passenger trains in the station.

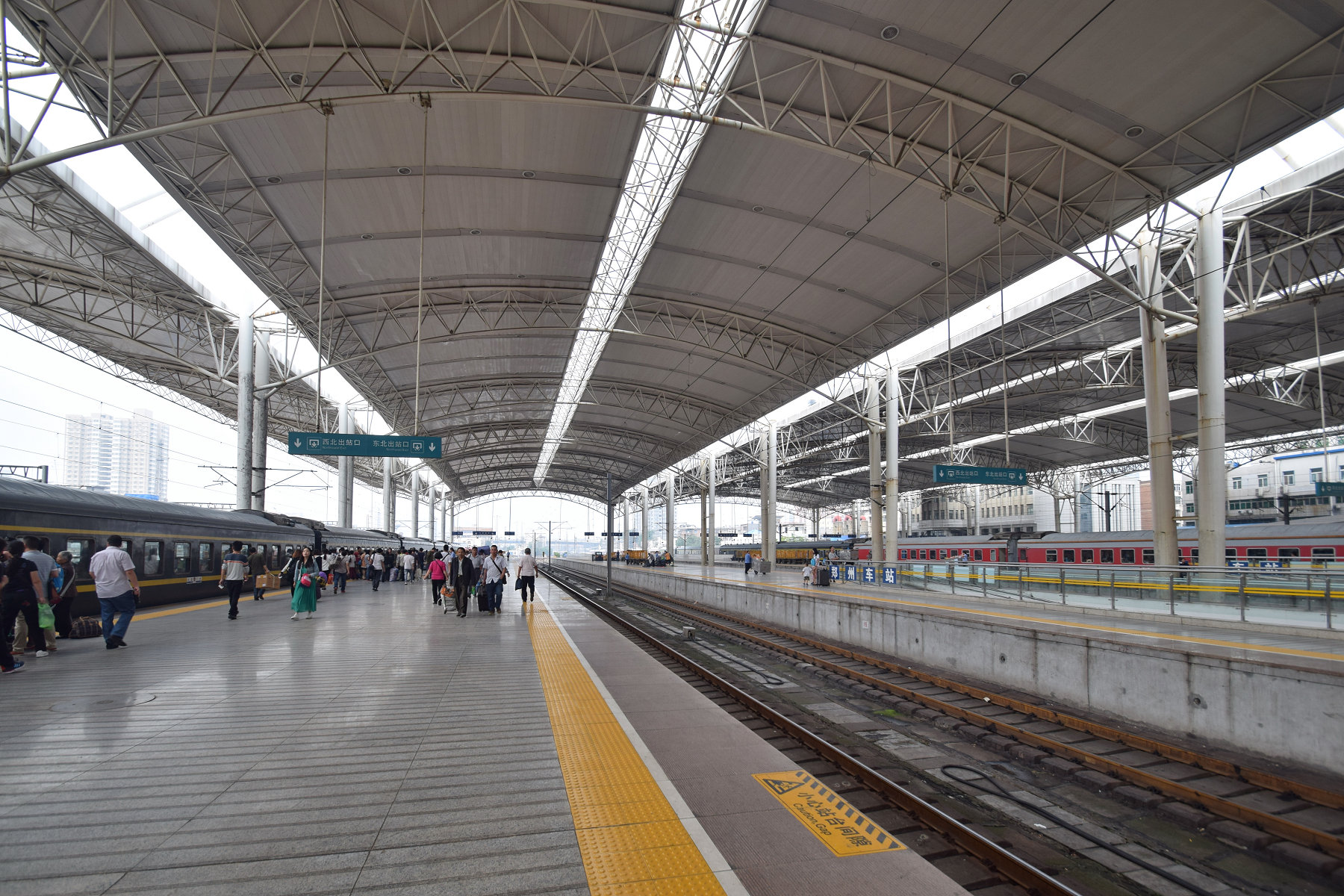
Platforms of the station

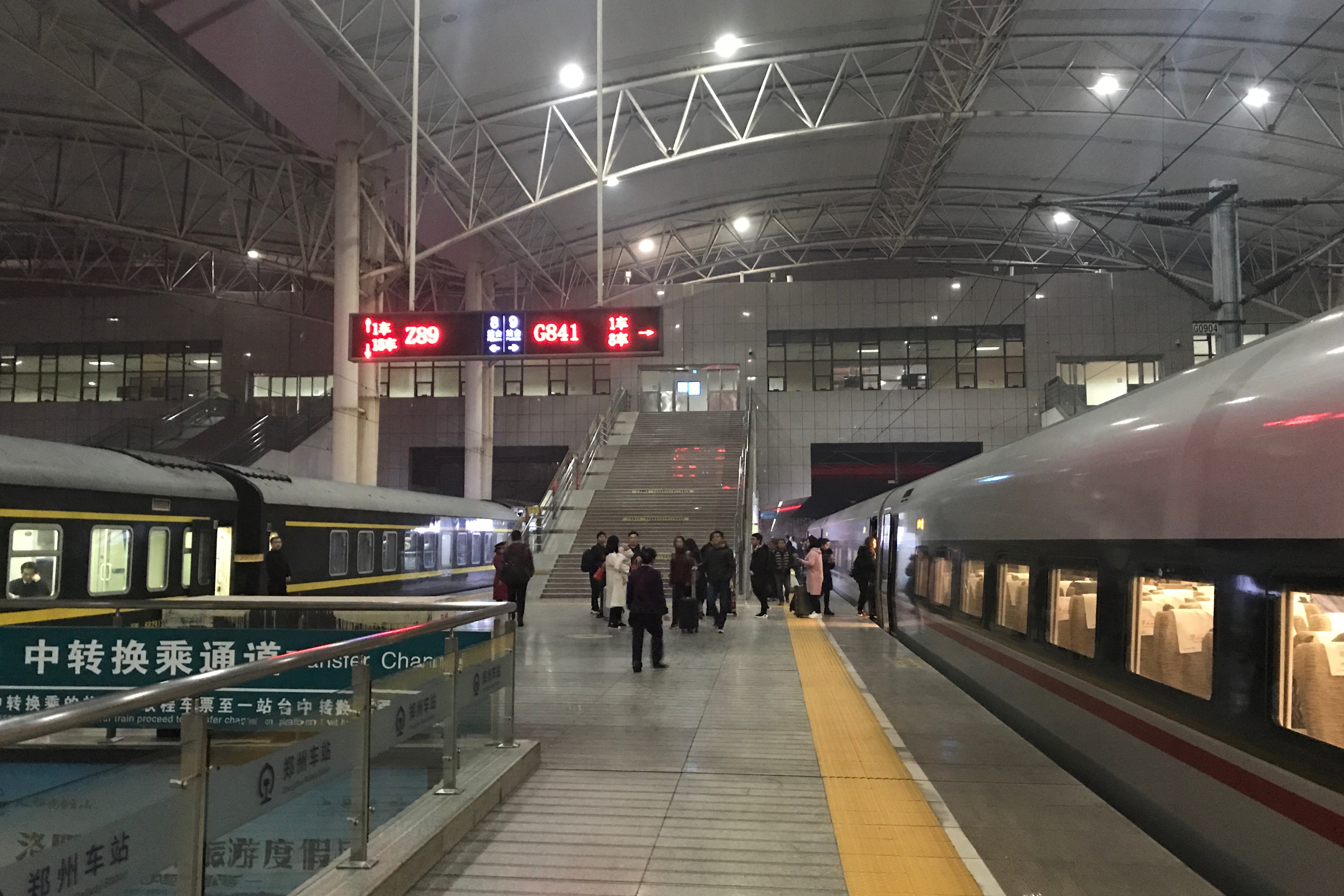
Trains at Platform 8 and 9 of the station

== Metro station ==
Zhengzhou Railway Station 郑州火车站
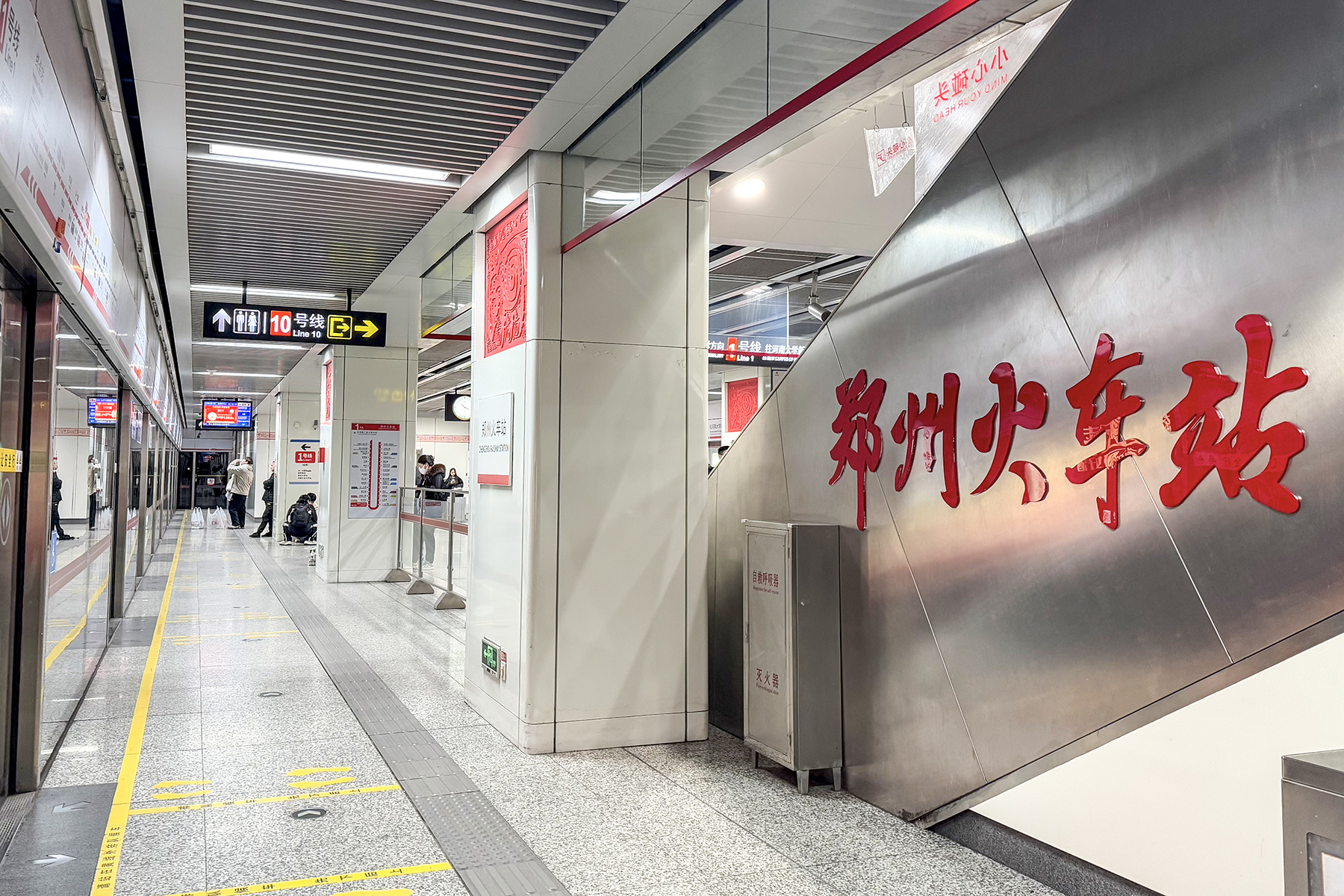
- Platforms of Line 1

General information
- Location: Erqi District, Zhengzhou; China
- System: Zhengzhou Metro rapid transit station
- Operator: Zhengzhou Metro
- Lines: Line 1; Line 10
- Platforms: 2 (1 island platform)
- Connections: Zhengzhou railway station; Bus terminal

Construction
- Structure type: Underground

Other information
- Station code: 128

History
- Opened: 28 December 2013 (Line 1); 28 September 2023 (Line 10)

Services
Preceding station	Zhengzhou Metro	Following station
Yixueyuan towards Henan University of Technology	Line 1	Erqiguangchang towards New Campus of Henan University
Yixueyuan towards Zhengzhouxi Railway Station	Line 10	Terminus
Location

Zhengzhou Railway Station (Chinese: 郑州火车站; pinyin: Zhèngzhōu Huǒchē Zhàn) is a metro station on Zhengzhou Metro Line 1 and Line 10. The station lies beneath the West square of Zhengzhou railway station.

A wall at the station concourse is decorated as a train carriage painted in typical Chinese railway livery of olive green.

=== Station layout ===
The station has 3 levels underground. The concourse is on the B2 level and a single island platform for Line 1 is on the B3 level. The part for Line 10 opened on 28 September 2023.

=== Future development ===
The station will become an interchange station of Line 1 and Line 10 upon the completion of Line 10.

== Bus terminals ==
The station is an important urban public transit hub and several bus terminals are around the station, including the following.

- Railway Station North Terminus (Chinese: 火车站北港湾) on the north side of the east plaza.
- Railway Station South Terminus (Chinese: 火车站南港湾) on the south side of the east plaza.
- Railway Station (Yima Road) (Chinese: 火车站一马路) on Yima Road, the south side of the east plaza.
- Railway Station West Plaza (Chinese: 火车站西广场) on the west plaza.
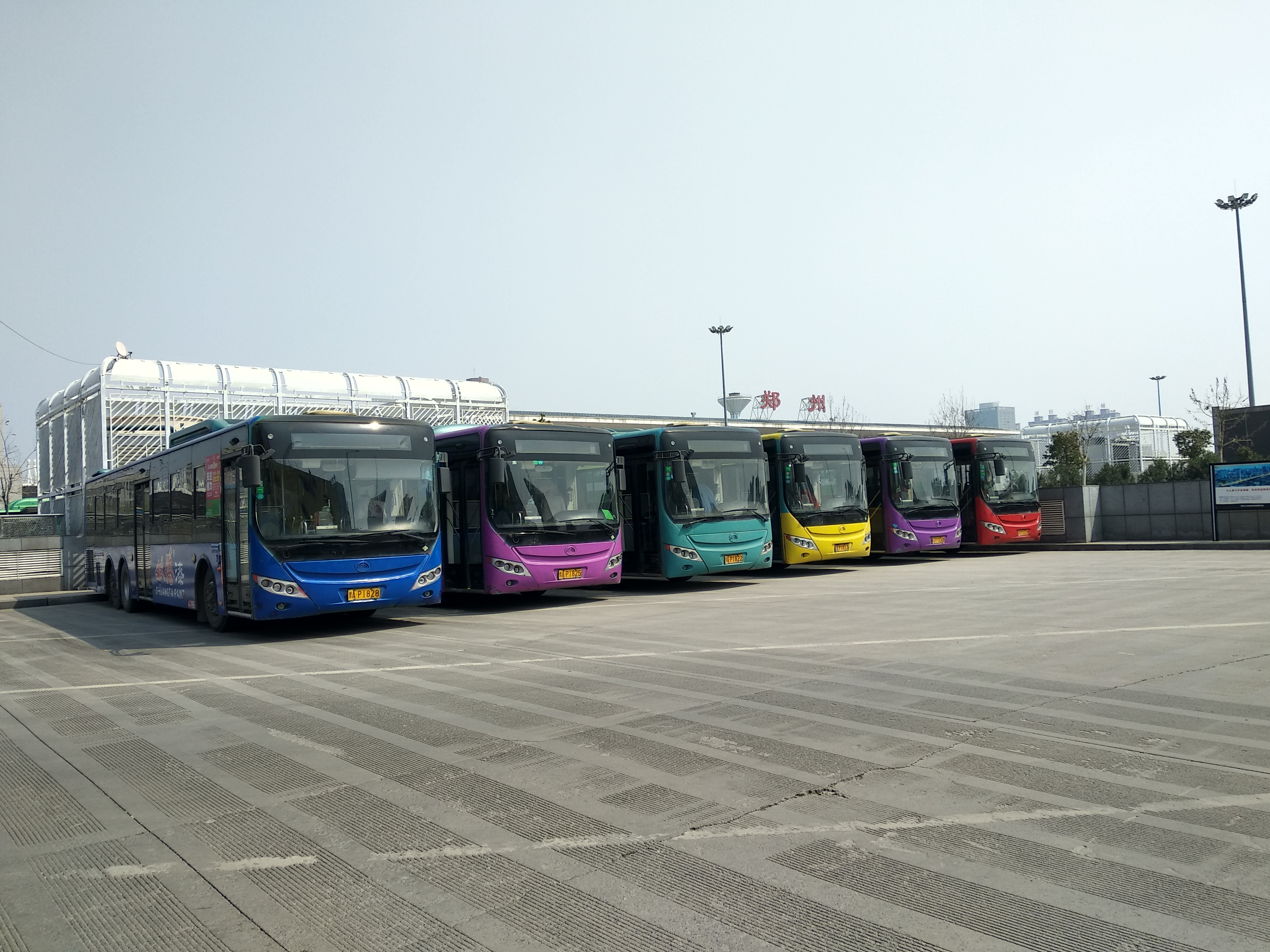
Buses at west plaza terminal

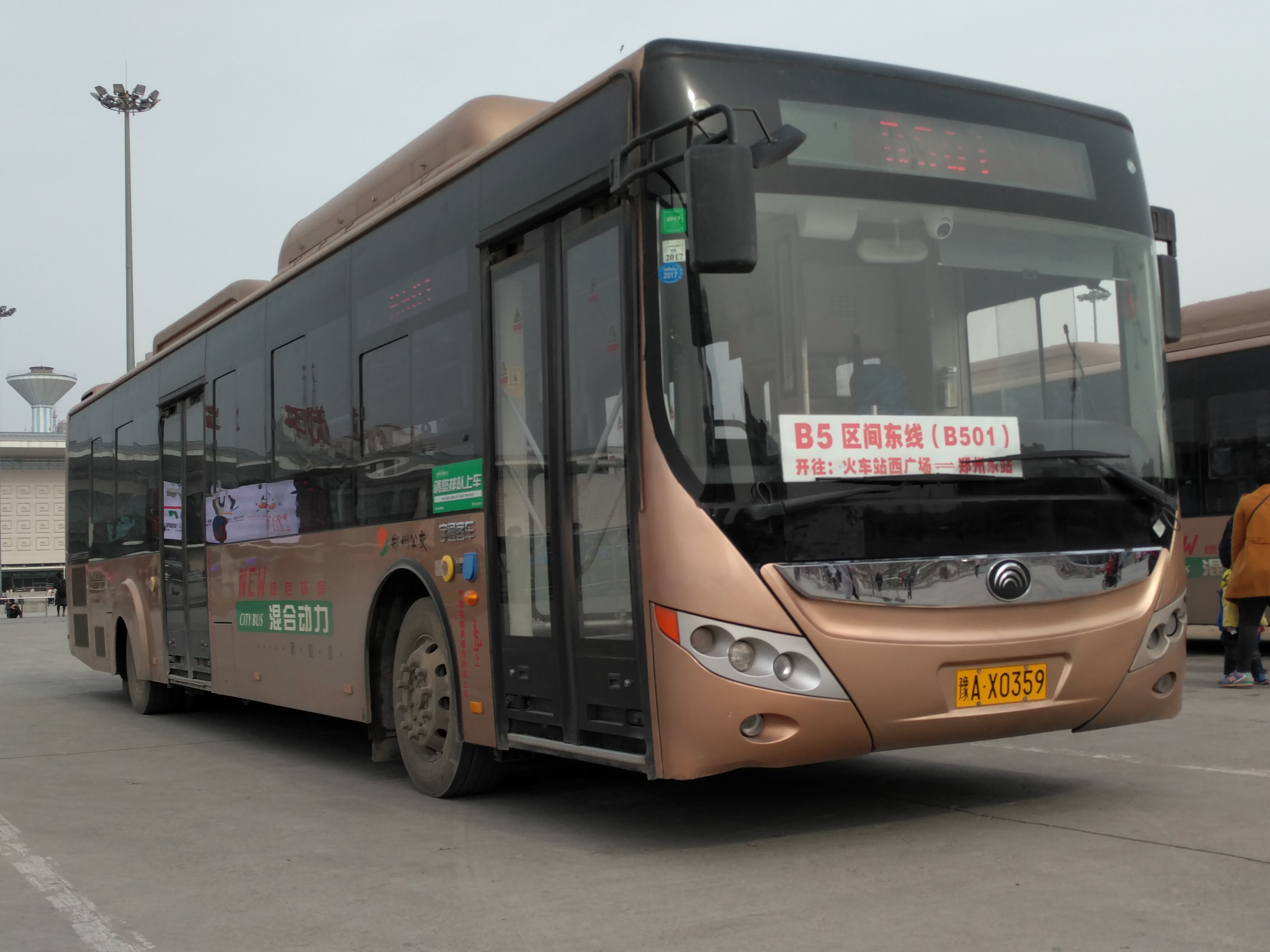
A bus on Zhengzhou BRT Route B501 at west plaza terminal

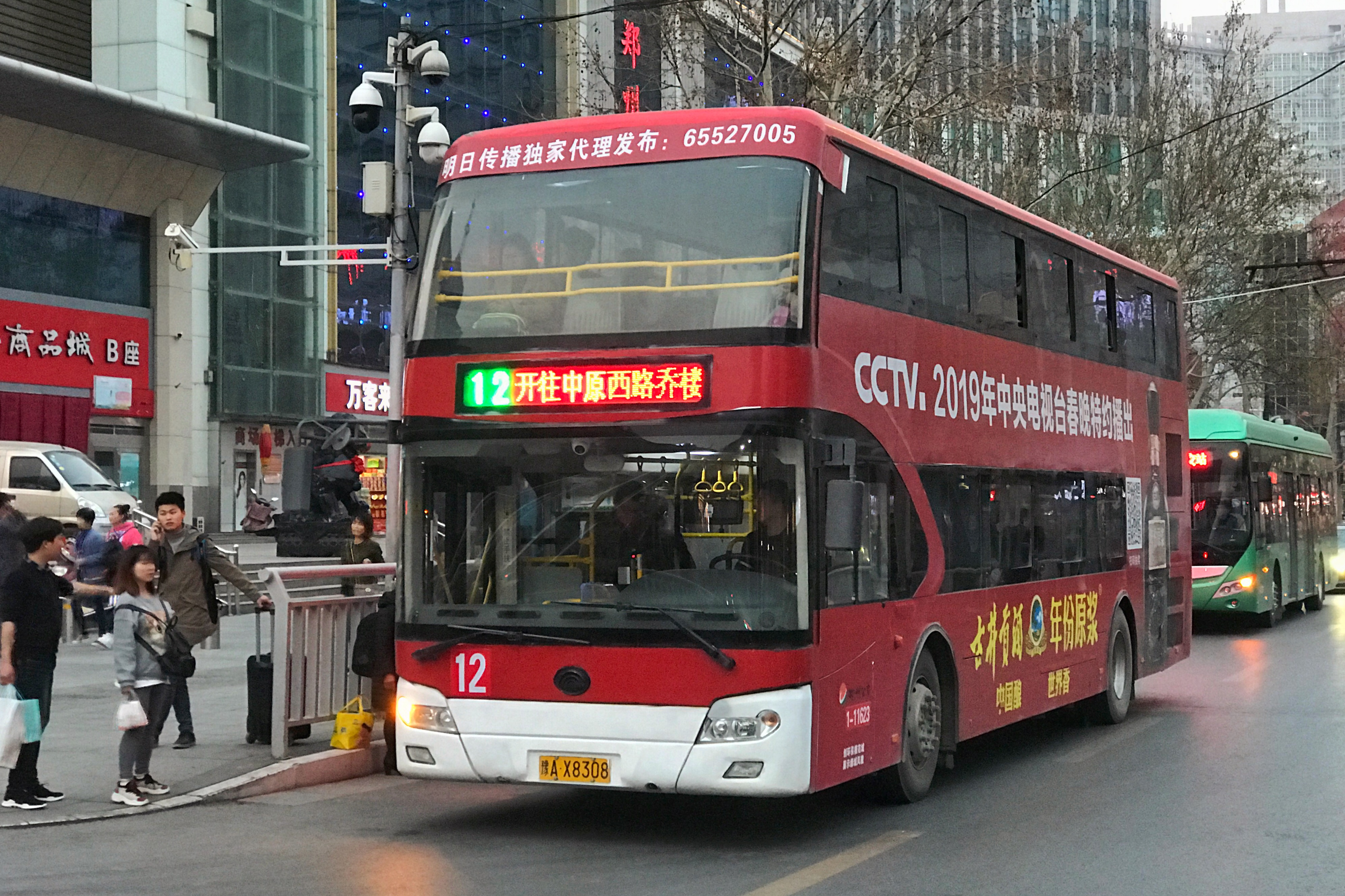
A double-decker bus on Route 12 at the north terminus on east plaza

== See also ==
- Zhengzhou East railway station: the main high-speed railway station for Zhengzhou
- Zhengzhou Hangkonggang railway station: a high-speed railway station for Zhengzhou–Wanzhou high-speed railway and Zhengzhou–Fuyang high-speed railway
- Zhengzhou West railway station: a high-speed railway station on Xuzhou–Lanzhou high-speed railway
