= Zhengzhou West railway station =

Railway station in Zhengzhou, China

Zhengzhouxi 郑州西
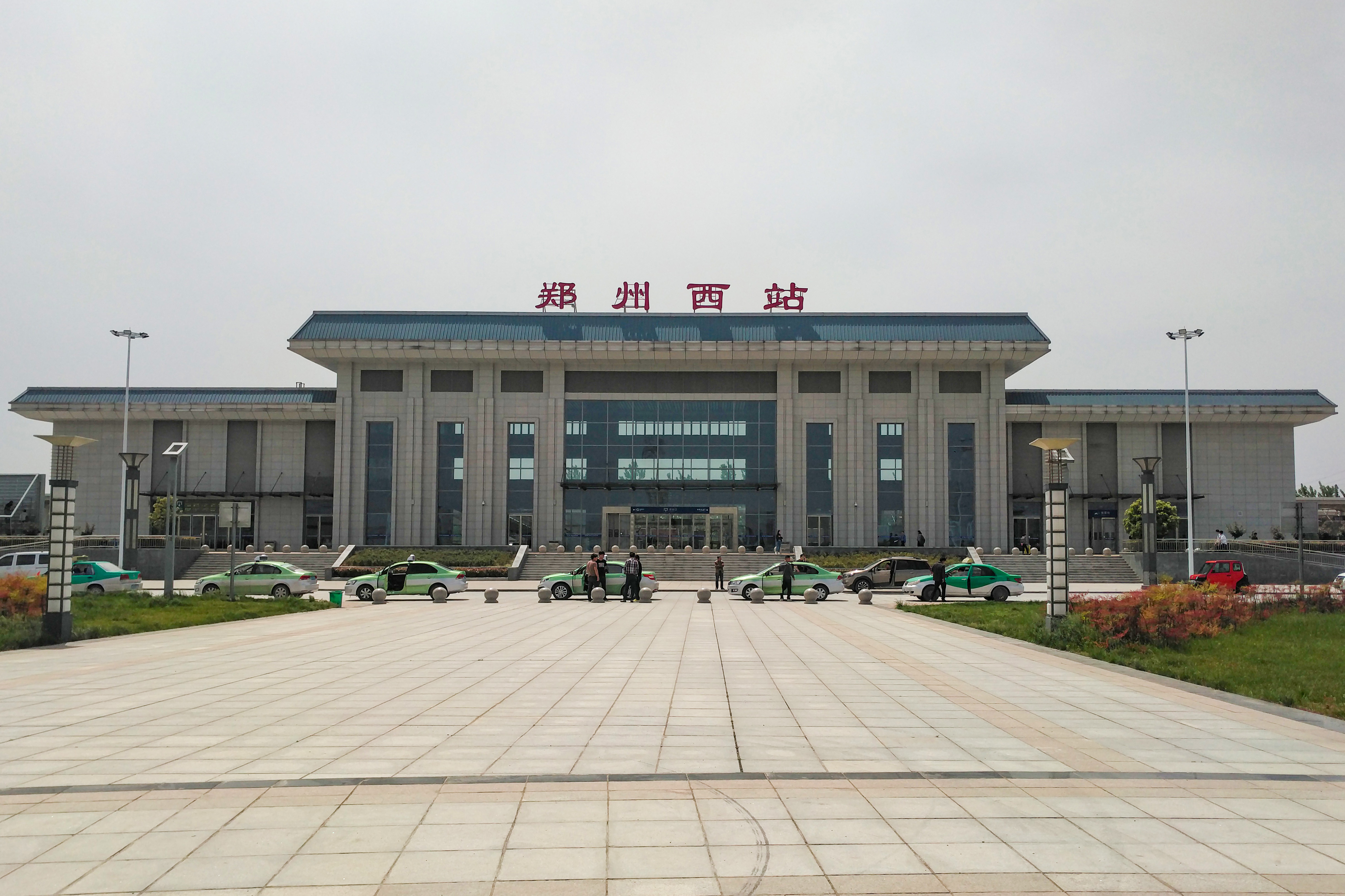

General information
- Other names: Zhengzhou West
- Location: Cross of Zhongyuan W. Road and Xingze Avenue; Xingyang, Zhengzhou, Henan; China
- Coordinates: 34.7443°N 113.4185°E
- Operator: China Railway Zhengzhou Group
- Line: Xuzhou–Lanzhou High-Speed Railway
- Platforms: 2
- Tracks: 4
- Connections: Bus

Other information
- Station code: 39059 (TMIS code); XPF (telegraph code); XYN (Pinyin code)

History
- Opened: 18 December 2015
- Former names: Xingyang South (Chinese: 荥阳南)
Location
- Location within Zhengzhou Location within Henan

Zhengzhouxi (Zhengzhou West) railway station (Chinese: 郑州西站) is a railway station of Zhengzhou–Xi'an high-speed railway located in Xingyang, Zhengzhou, Henan, China. The station was once named Xingyang South railway station (Chinese: 荥阳南站) and was renamed to the current name on 10 July 2014. It started operation on 18 December 2015. There is also a connecting line to the east of this station allowing trains to reach Zhengzhou railway station.

== Station Layout ==
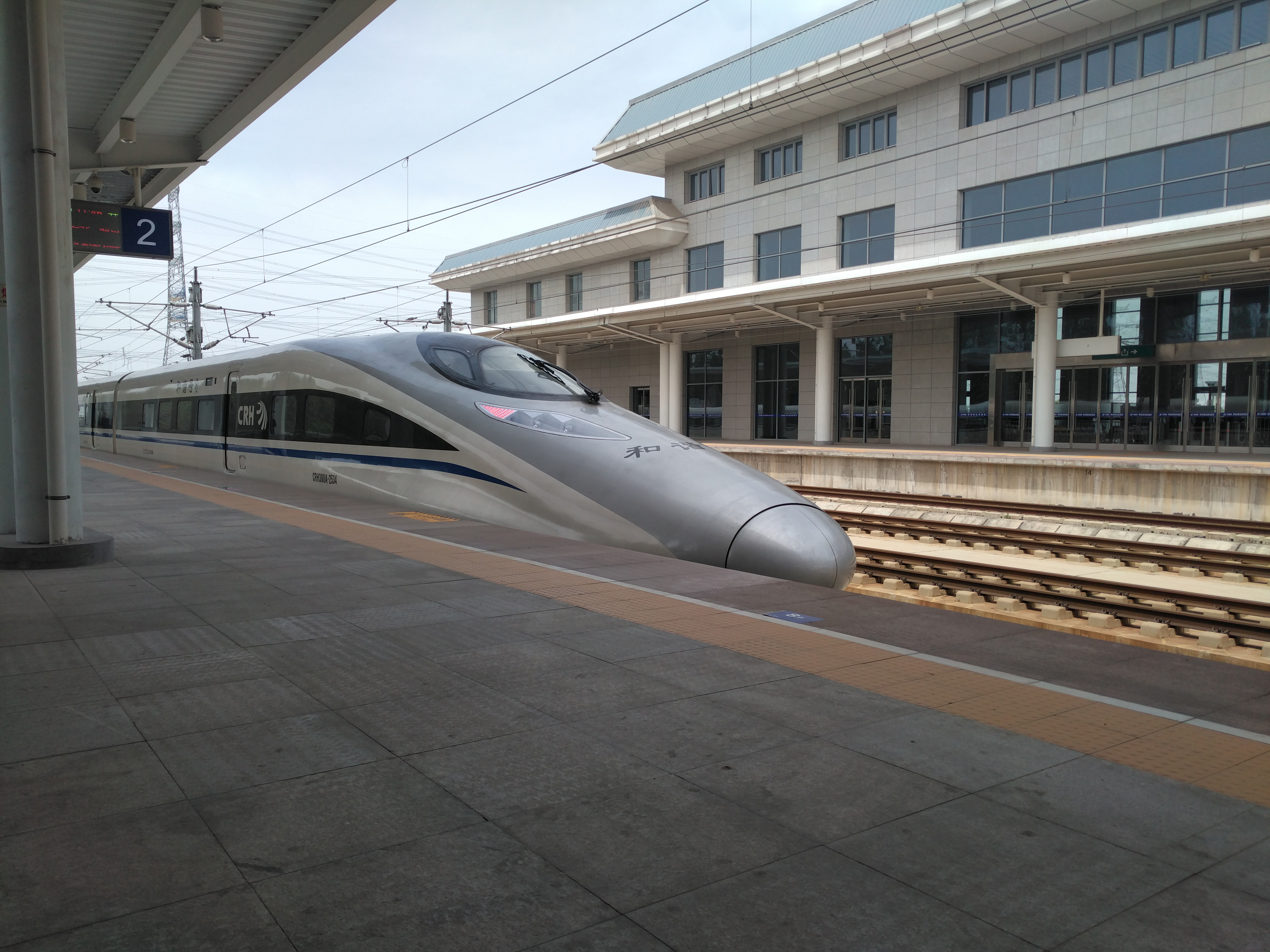
A CRH380A EMU at the station

The station has 2 side platforms and 4 tracks. The station building is to the north of the platforms.

| 1F | Concourse | Waiting area, ticket office, stores |
| 1F | Side platform |
| 1F | Platform 1 | Xuzhou–Lanzhou high-speed railway towards Xuzhou East (Zhengzhou East) → |
| 1F | Through track | Xuzhou–Lanzhou high-speed railway → |
| 1F | Through track | ← Xuzhou–Lanzhou high-speed railway |
| 1F | Platform 2 | ← Xuzhou–Lanzhou high-speed railway towards Lanzhou West (Gongyi South) |
| 1F | Side platform |

| Preceding station | China Railway High-speed | Following station |
|---|---|---|
| Zhengzhou East towards Zhengzhou | Zhengzhou–Xi'an high-speed railway Part of the Eurasia Continental Bridge corridor | Gongyi South towards Xi'an North |
