= Zhengzhou University of Aeronautics =

Public university in Zhengzhou, China

Coordinates: 34.7169°N 113.6452°E

Zhengzhou University of Aeronautics (Chinese: 郑州航空工业管理学院; pinyin: Zhèngzhōu Hángkōng Gōngyè Guǎnlǐ Xuéyuàn), formerly known as Zhengzhou Institute of Aeronautical Industry Management, is a public university located in Zhengzhou, Henan, China.

== History ==
Zhengzhou Institute of Aeronautical Industry Management's predecessor was founded in 1949. PingYuan Provincial Finance School, which was renamed and relocated several times. In 1984, the university changed its name to Zhengzhou Institute of Aeronautical Industry Management (Abbreviation: ZZIA). It is one of six undergraduate colleges part of the original Aerospace Aviation Ministry (the other five are BUAA, NUAA, NPU, SAU and NCHU). In 1999, the school affiliation changed. Head of Aviation Industry Corporation of China into the central and local governments, the daily management based in Henan, is one of the key universities in Henan province key construction.

== Campus Environment ==
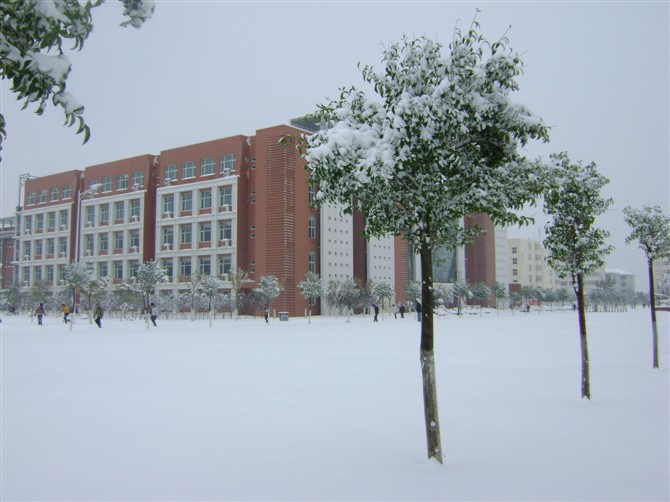
snowy winter scenery

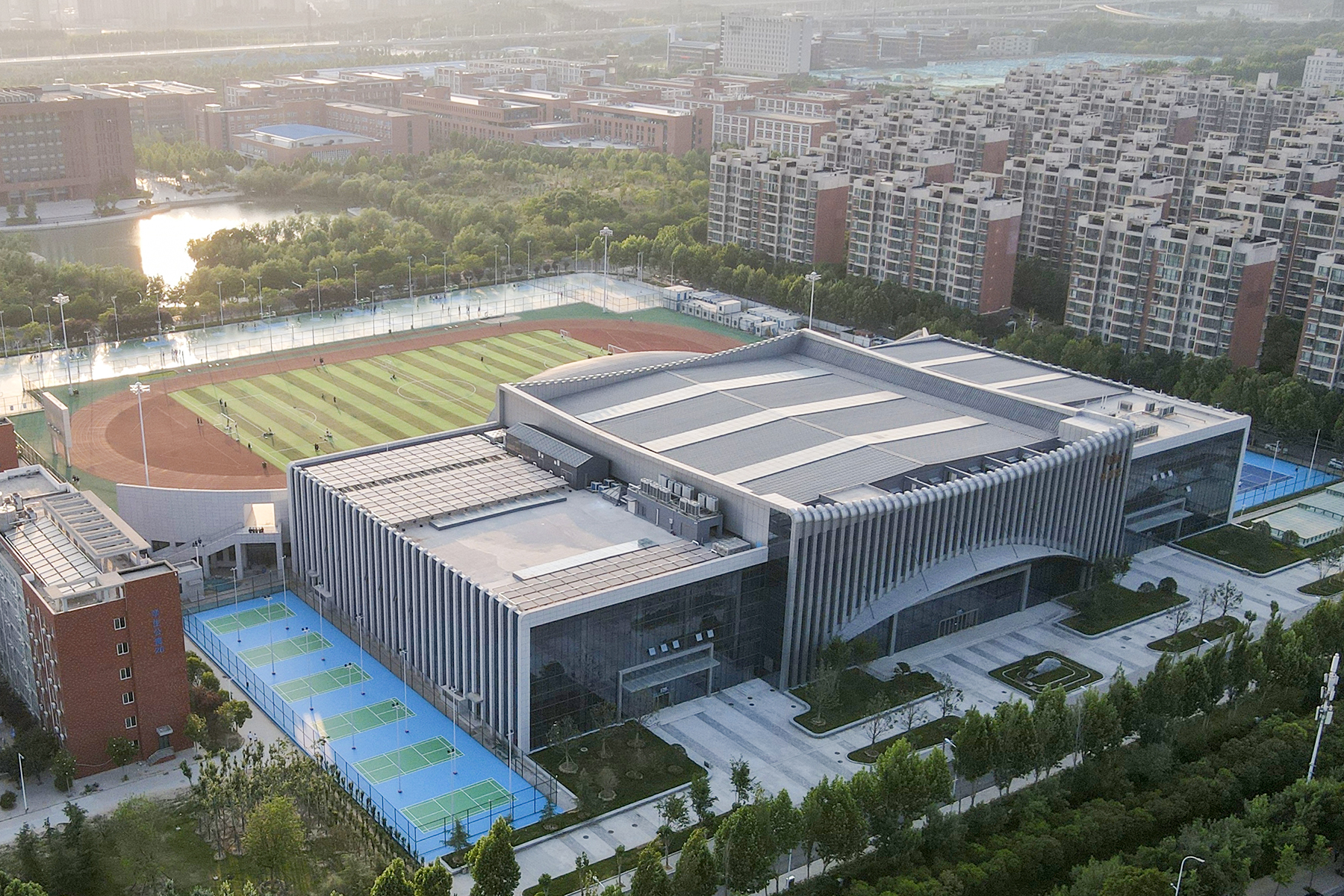
Gymnasiums and sports grounds

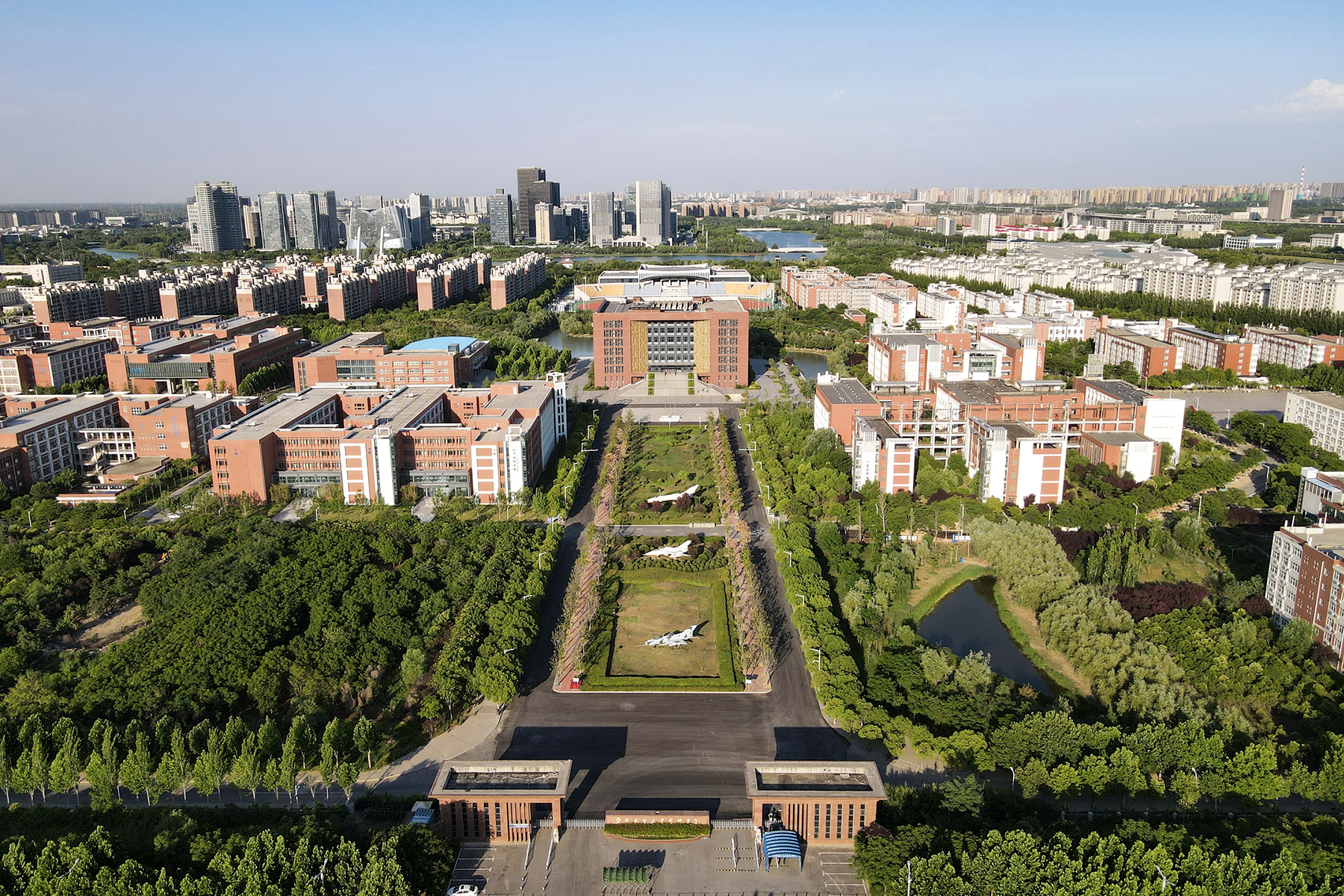
East Campus

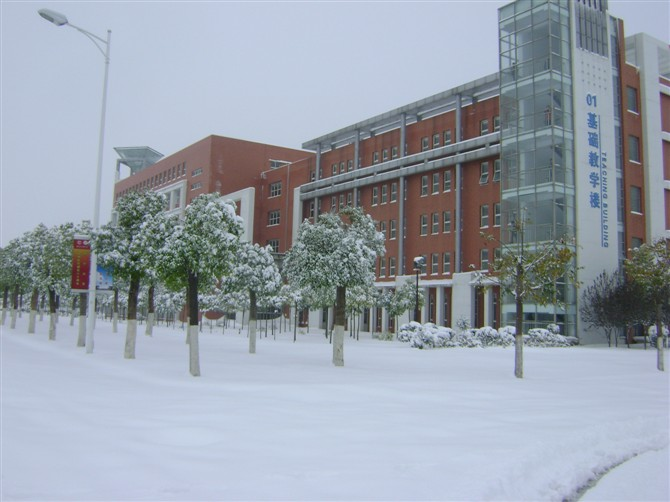
snowy winter scenery
