= Fan Pengfei =

Chinese singer (born 1992)

- 范朋飞
- Born: 15 February 1992 (age 34); Zhengzhou, Henan, China
- Occupations: Singer; Singer-songwriter
- Years active: 2011–present
- Musical career
- Genres: Pop; R&B; Dance-pop; World; Classical; China style

Fan Pengfei (simplified Chinese: 范朋飞; traditional Chinese: 範朋飛; born 15 February 1992) is a Chinese singer, songwriter and musician in pop music. He was born in Zhengzhou, Henan.

== Career ==
=== Early life ===
Fan Pengfei studied music in his spare time in college. He wrote lyrics after graduating.

=== 2012 to 2014 ===
Fan Pengfei released his first album "Do not hurt me" (Chinese: 不疼我) on 28 June 2012. He released his second album "Holding the Son of Heaven to Order Princes" (Chinese: 挟天子以令诸侯) on 3 March 2013. He released his third album "Li Family" (Chinese: 李家姑娘) on 15 March 2014. He released his fourth music album "Wandering Together" (Chinese: 一起去流浪) on 21 October 2014.

=== 2015 to 2022 ===
Fan Pengfei released his single "Between You and Me" (Chinese: 你我之间) on 22 November 2021.

== Discography ==
=== Albums ===
Album	Title	Released date	Label
1st	Do not hurt me (不疼我)	28 June 2012	Self released
2nd	Holding the Son of Heaven to Order Princes (挟天子以令诸侯)	3 March 2013	Self released
3rd	Li Family (李家姑娘)	15 March 2014	Self released
4th	Wandering Together (一起去流浪)	21 October 2014	Self released
