= Zhengzhou =

Capital of Henan, China

Zhengzhou 郑州市 Chengchow
- Prefecture-level city
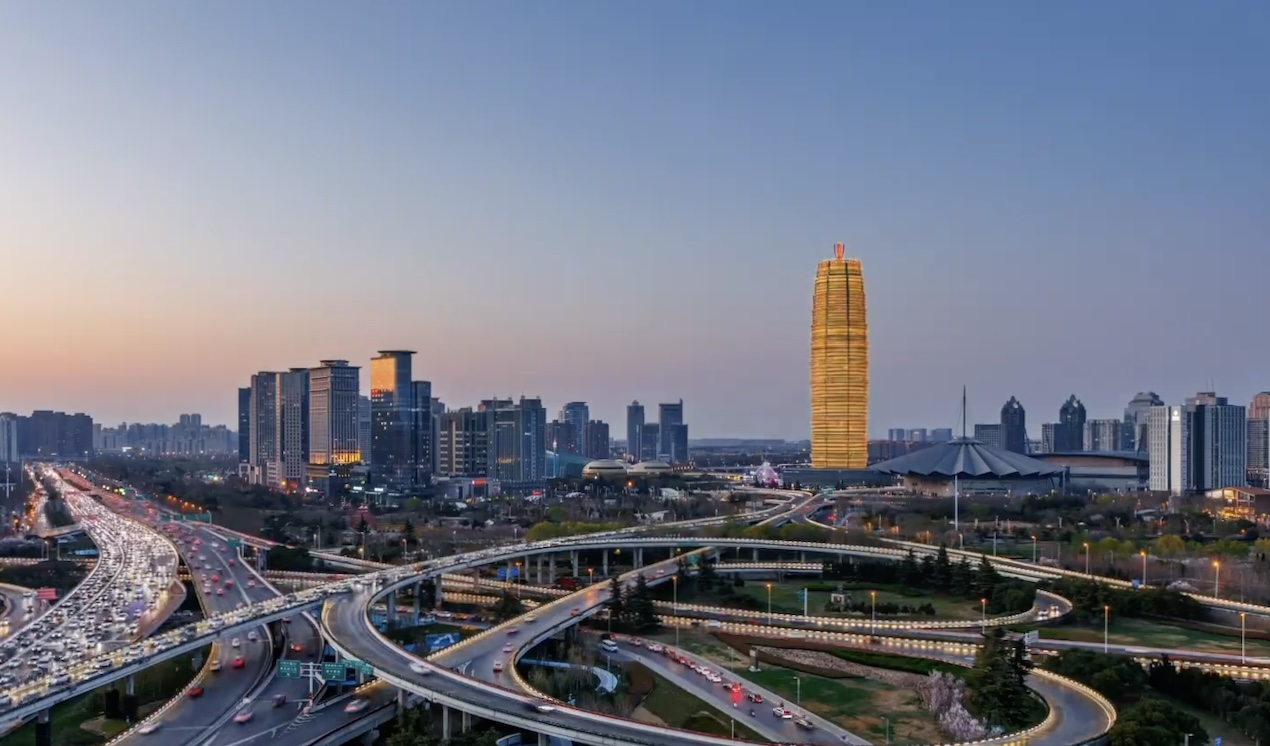
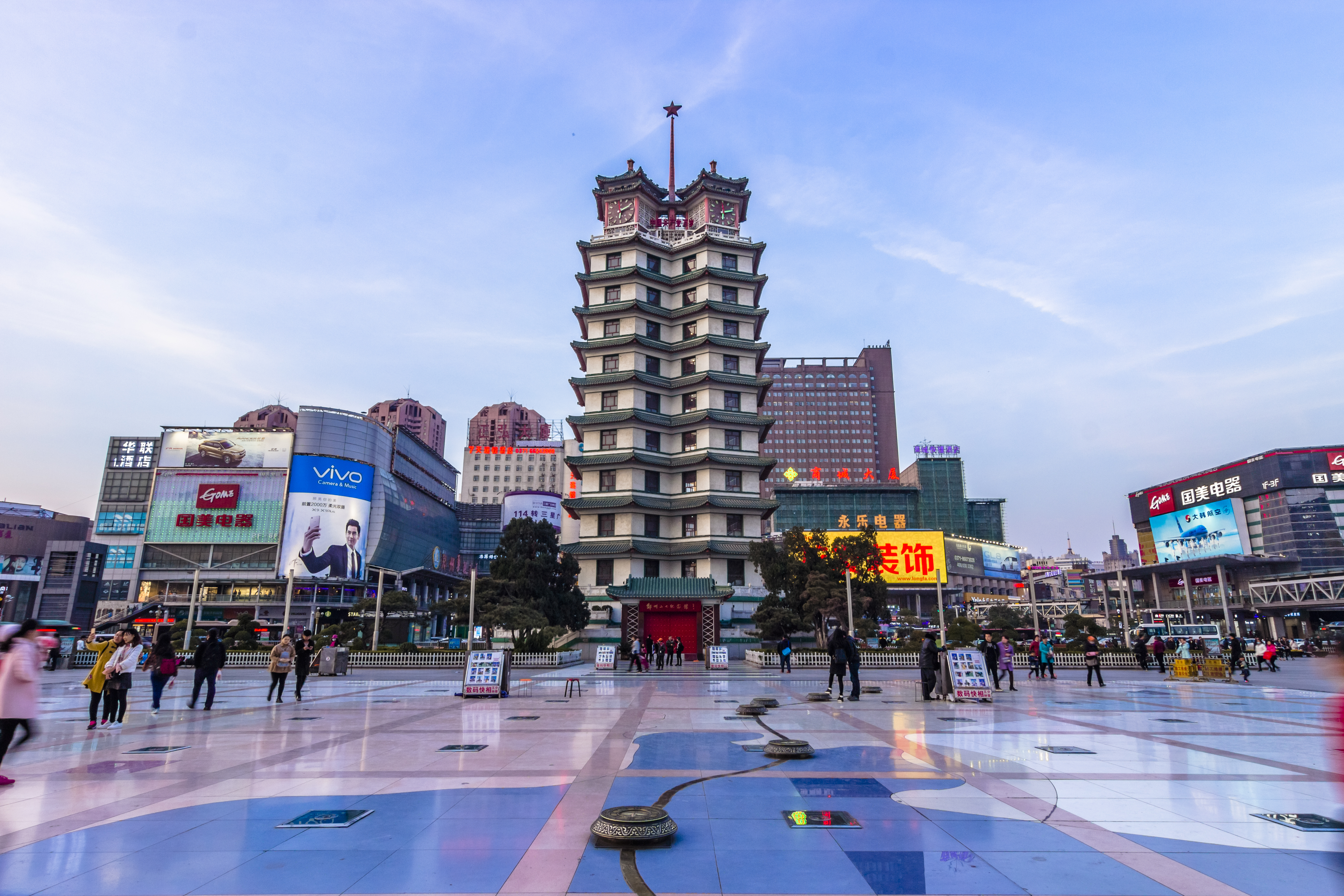
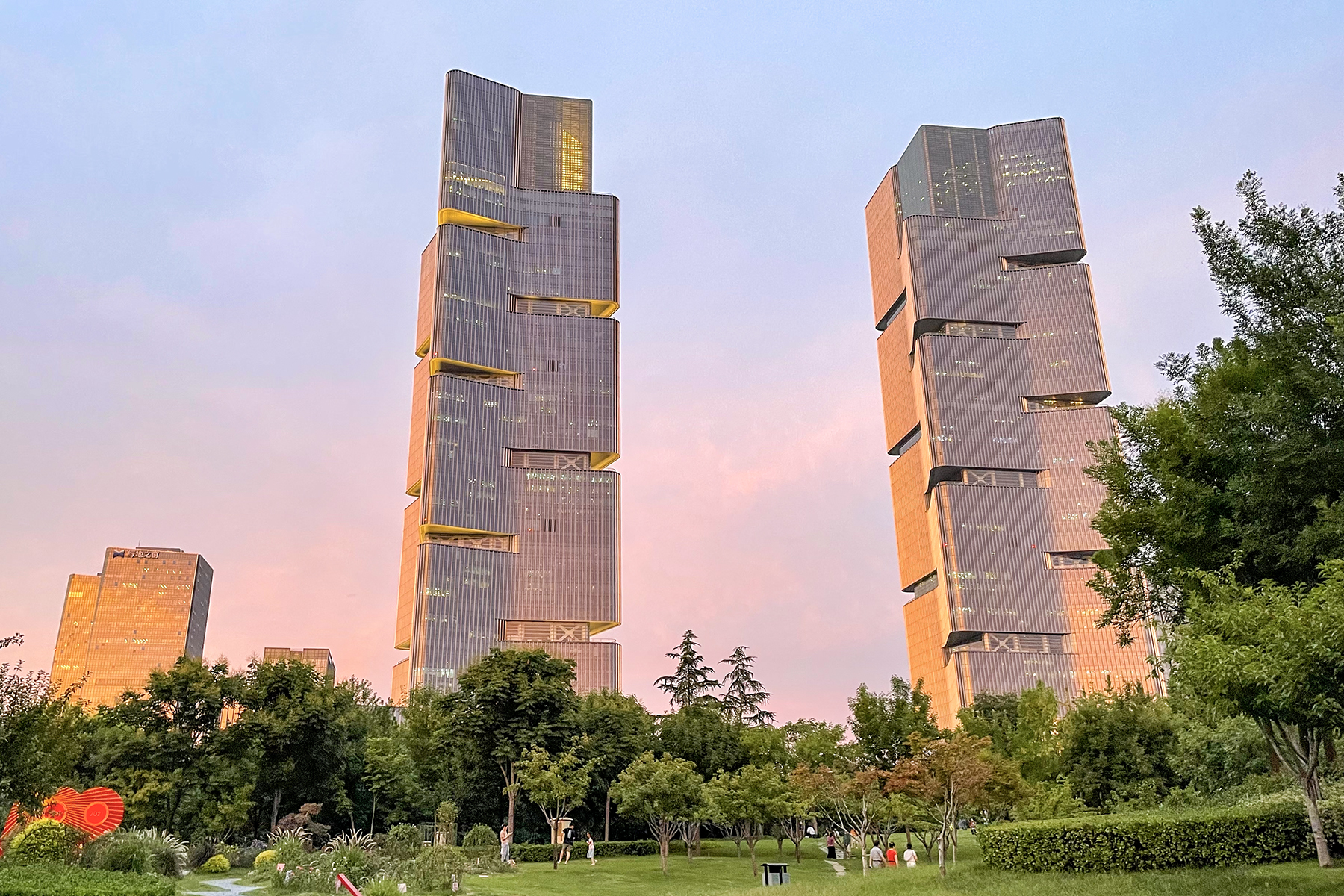
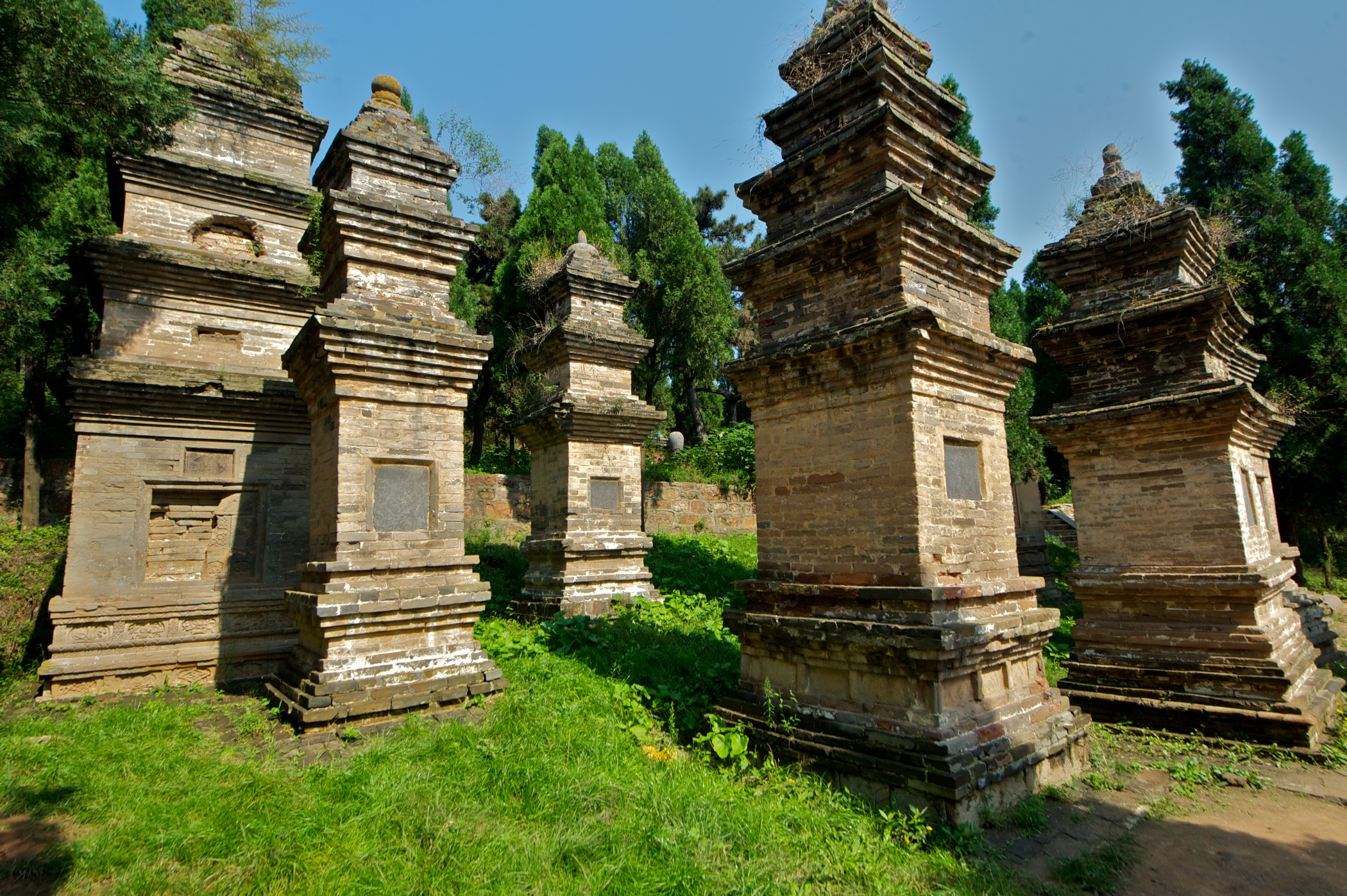
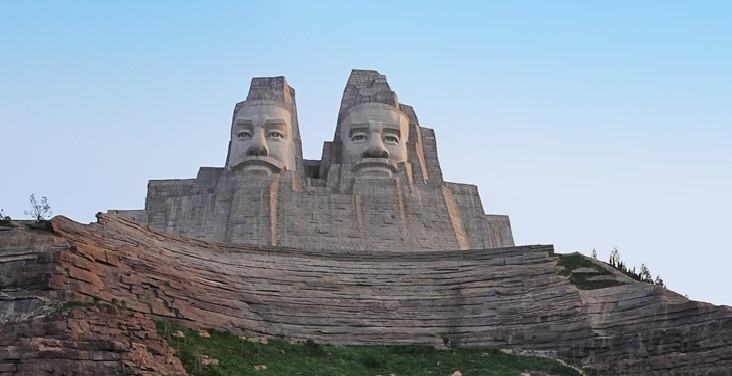
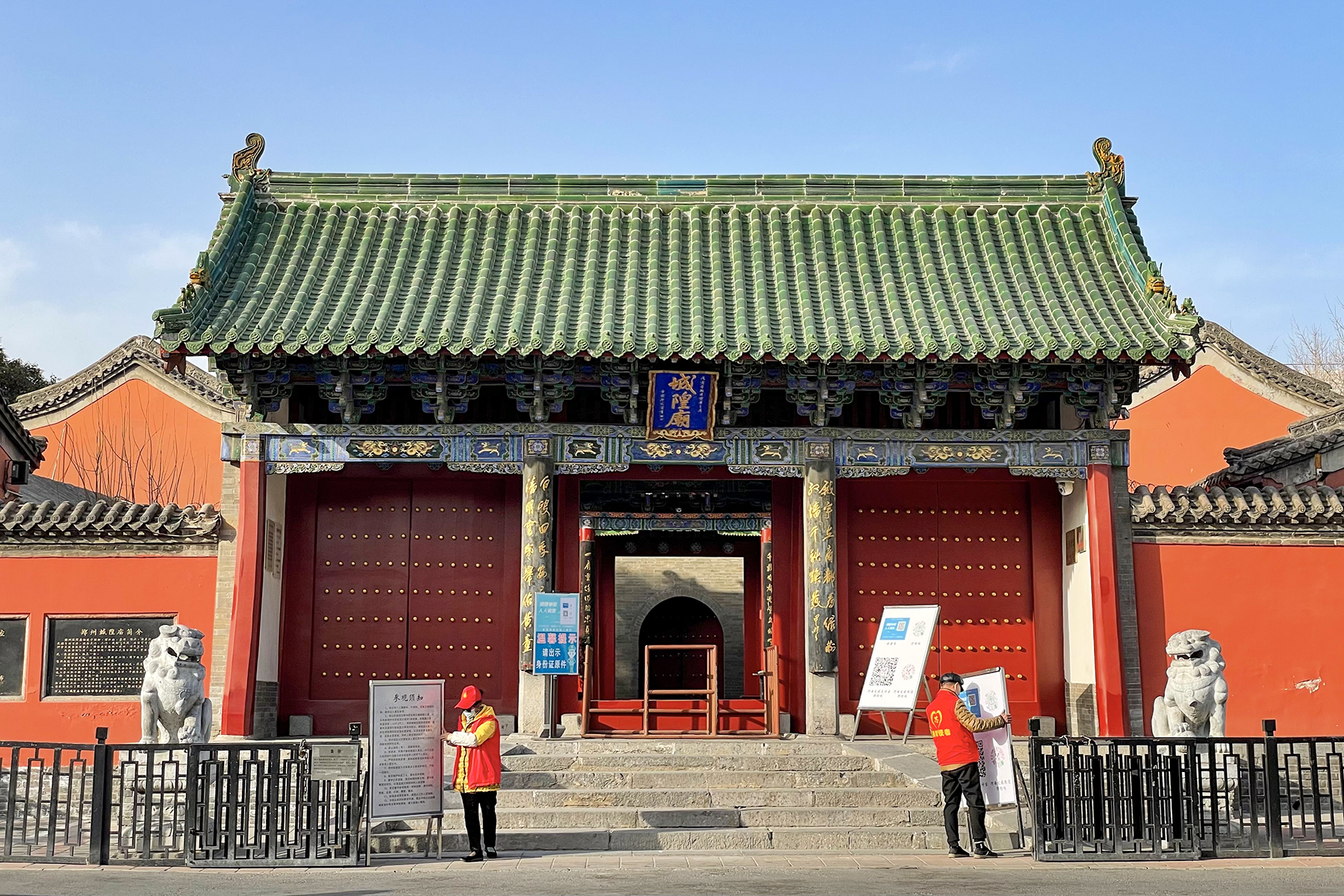
- Zhengdong New Area CBD Erqi Memorial Tower at Erqi Square Greenland Central Plaza Shaolin Monastery Pagoda Forest Emperors Yan and Huang Zhengzhou City God Temple
- Nicknames: capital of Shang, green city
- Motto: Partnership, Openness, Innovation, and Harmony (博大、开放、创新、和谐)
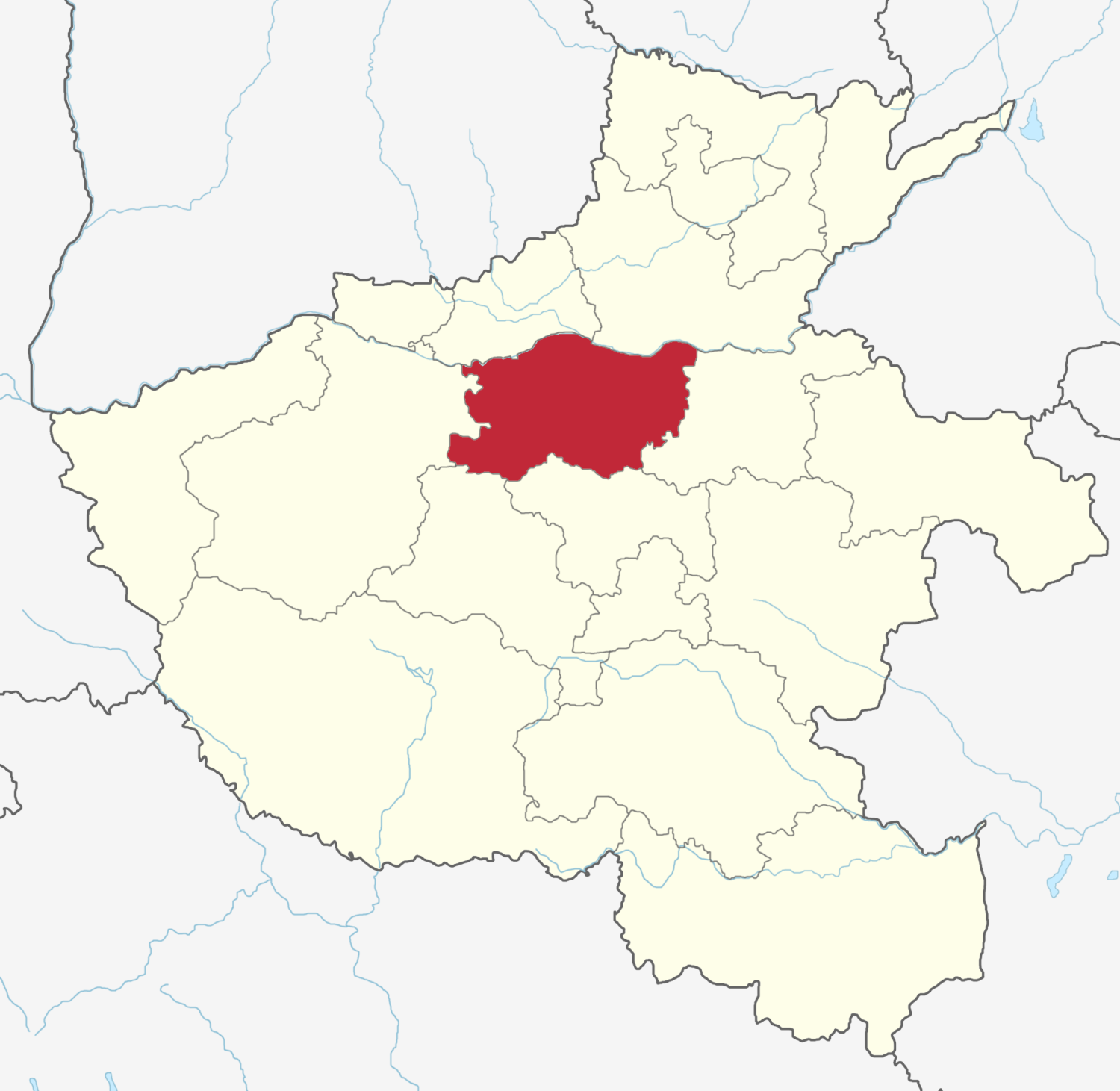
- Location of Zhengzhou City; jurisdiction in Henan

- Location in the North China Plain Zhengzhou (China)
- Coordinates (Henan Provincial Hall of the People): 34°45′50″N 113°41′02″E
- Country: China
- Province: Henan
- Established: 16th century BCE (Note: Based on archeological research. See also Zhengzhou Shang City.)
- City seat: Zhongyuan
- Subdivisions: List: Districts; Erqi; Guancheng Hui; Huiji; Jinshui; Shangjie; Zhongyuan; County-level cities; Dengfeng; Gongyi; Xingyang; Xinmi; Xinzheng; County; Zhongmu

Government
  - Type: Prefecture-level city
  - Body: Zhengzhou Municipal People's Congress
  - CCP Secretary: Wang Song
  - Congress Chairman: Zhou Fuqiang
  - Mayor: Zhuang Jianqiu
  - CPPCC Chairman: Du Xinjun

Area
  - Prefecture-level city: 7,567 km^{2} (2,922 sq mi)
  - Urban: 1,284.89 km^{2} (496.10 sq mi)
  - Metro: 4,271.4 km^{2} (1,649.2 sq mi)

Population (2020 census)
  - Prefecture-level city: 12,600,574
  - Rank: 15th in China (by urban population)
  - Density: 1,665/km^{2} (4,313/sq mi)
  - Urban: 6,650,532
  - Urban density: 5,175.95/km^{2} (13,405.7/sq mi)
  - Metro: 10,260,667
  - Metro density: 2,402.2/km^{2} (6,221.6/sq mi)

GDP
  - Prefecture-level city: CN¥ 1,453 trillion US$ 204 billion
  - Per capita: CN¥ 115,334; US$ 16,195
- Time zone: UTC+8 (China Standard)
- Postal code: 450000
- Area code: 371
- ISO 3166 code: CN-HA-01
- License plate prefixes: 豫A 豫V
- Website: www.zhengzhou.gov.cn

Zhengzhou
- "Zhèngzhōu" in Simplified (top) and Traditional (bottom) Chinese characters
- Simplified Chinese: 郑州
- Traditional Chinese: 鄭州
- Literal meaning: "Zhèng Settlement"
Transcriptions
Standard Mandarin
- Hanyu Pinyin: Zhèngzhōu
- Bopomofo: ㄓㄥˋ ㄓㄡ
- Wade–Giles: Chêng^{4}-chou^{1}
- IPA: [ʈʂə̂ŋ.ʈʂóʊ]
other Mandarin
- Xiao'erjing: ژېڭژَوْ
Yue: Cantonese
- Yale Romanization: Jehng-jāu
- Jyutping: Zeng^{6}-zau^{1}
- IPA: [tsɛŋ˨.tsɐw˥]
Southern Min
- Hokkien POJ: Tēⁿ-chiu
- Tâi-lô: Tēnn-tsiu

Zhengzhou, (Note: /dʒɛŋˈdʒoʊ, dʒʌŋ-/, jeng-JOH, jung-; simplified Chinese: 郑州; traditional Chinese: 鄭州; pinyin: Zhèngzhōu)) previously romanized as Chengchow, (Note: /ˈtʃɛŋˈtʃaʊ/ Cheng-chou) is the capital and the largest city of Henan Province, China. With a population of 12.6 million people in 2021, it is China's 11th largest city by population. Zhengzhou is situated in north-central Henan Province at the eastern foothills of the Xiong'er Mountains and on the southern bank of the Yellow River; where its valley widens into the North China Plain. Zhengzhou is a major city within the Zhongyuan region, an area that has been continuously inhabited for over 4,000 years, and is considered a cradle of Chinese civilization. It is one of China's nine national central cities, serving as a major political, economic and transport hub. The Zhengzhou metropolitan area, including Zhengzhou and Kaifeng, is the core area of the Central Plains Economic Zone.

Originally an early Shang dynasty urban center, the area that is now Zhengzhou was the site of the Shang capital Áo (隞) or Bó (亳) (c. 1600-1046 BC). Following the Shang dynasty, Zhengzhou remained an important regional city due to its strategic location on the North China Plains, and the city first became the seat of a prefectural administration in 587 CE in the Sui dynasty. In the Republican period, Nationalist forces breached the dikes at Huayuankou in June 1938, north of Zhengzhou, to hinder the Japanese advance during the Second Sino-Japanese War. The resulting flood inundated large areas of Henan, Anhui and Jiangsu provinces; the Yellow River did not return to its original course until 1947.

In the 1990s, following China's reform and opening up supported by Deng Xiaoping, Zhengzhou's economy expanded rapidly: its gross domestic product grew from ¥2.03 billion in 1978 to over ¥100 billion by 2003. As state monopoly reforms progressed throughout this decade, Zhengzhou pioneered commercial reforms among inland regions, with numerous wholesale markets forming near railway freight stations to facilitate the growth of private enterprises. The city had a total GDP of 1.524 trillion (RMB) in 2025. It is the home of the Zhengzhou Commodity Exchange, the first futures exchange approved by the State Council of China in October 1990. The first Airport Economy Zone in China was established in Zhengzhou Airport Economy Zone. Zhengzhou has been classified as a Beta (global second-tier) city together with nine other cities in China, including Chongqing, Xiamen, Nanjing and Jinan by the Globalization and World Cities Research Network. Greater Zhengzhou was named as one of the 13 emerging megacities in China in a July 2012 report by the Economist Intelligence Unit, and was officially named as the eighth National Central City in 2017 by the central government in Beijing. The city holds the title of National Civilized City, and is also a National Famous Historical and Cultural City.

Zhengzhou is also a major city for scientific research, often appearing among the world's top 60 cities as tracked by the Nature Index. The city is home to multiple institutes of higher education, notably Zhengzhou University, Henan University, Henan Agricultural University, Henan University of Chinese Medicine, and Henan University of Technology. There are two World Heritage Sites in Zhengzhou and one UNESCO Global Geopark in Songshan, Dengfeng. The city is home to the headquarters of Yutong Bus, the largest bus manufacturer in the world by sales volume.

== Etymology ==
The settlement was originally known as "Guancheng", meaning "City of the Guan", named after the Guan family who held the area as a city-state.

In 583 AD, it became the seat of a prefecture and was renamed "Guanzhou", with "zhou" indicating a prefectural administrative division. The character Zheng (郑) refers to the Zheng state, which once governed the region.

== History ==
Several city ruins dating back to the early Shang dynasty have been discovered in the Zhengzhou area, including candidate locations of the early Shang capitals Ao (隞), Bo (亳) or Yan (奄). Since 1950, archaeological finds in the Zhengzhou Shang City, a Shang capital city located near the historical center of Zhengzhou, have provided evidence of Shang settlements in the area around 1600 BC. Outside of the city, remains of large public buildings and a complex of small settlements have been discovered at a site 20 kilometres (12 mi) to the northwest. This site is identified by some as the Shang capital of Ao.

The Shang, who continually moved their capital, left the area around the 13th century BC. The Zhengzhou site, nevertheless, remained occupied; Zhou (post-1050 BC) tombs have also been discovered. After defeating the Shang, the King Wu of Zhou named three of his brothers as vassal rulers over territories around the core of the Shang kingdom. One of them was Shu Xian, who founded the city-state of Guan in what is now Zhengzhou. However, the three princes allied with Shang remnants and rebelled a few years later, although the rebellion was soon put down. From this derives the name borne by the county (xian) since the late 6th century BC—Guancheng (Guan City). The city first became the seat of a prefectural (zhou) administration in AD 587, when it was named Guanzhou.

The name Zhengzhou (Zheng Prefecture) dates back to the Sui dynasty (AD 582). During Sui times, the prefectural seat was located in Chenggao, another town. The prefecture moved to Guancheng during the Tang dynasty, and the city has been known as Zhengzhou ever since. It achieved great importance under the Sui (AD 581–618), Tang (618–907), and early Song (960–1127) dynasties, when it was the terminus of the New Bian Canal, which joined the Yellow River to the northwest. There, at a place called Heyin, a vast granary complex was established to supply the capitals at Luoyang and Chang'an to the west and the frontier armies to the north.

In 1903 the Beijing–Hankou Railway arrived at Zhengzhou, and in 1909 the first stage of the Longhai Railway gave it an east–west link to Kaifeng and Luoyang; it later was extended eastward to the coast at Lianyungang, Jiangsu, and westward to Xi'an (Chang'an), Shaanxi, as well as to western Shaanxi. Zhengzhou thus became a major rail junction and a regional center for cotton, grain, peanuts, and other agricultural produce. Early in 1923 a workers' strike began in Zhengzhou and spread along the rail line before it was suppressed; Erqi Memorial Tower, a 14-story double tower in the center of the city, commemorates the strike. On 10 June 1938, Chiang Kai-shek's National Revolutionary Army opened up the dikes retaining the Yellow River at Huayuankou between Zhengzhou and Kaifeng, in an effort to stem the tide of invading Japanese; however, the ensuing 1938 Yellow River flood also killed hundreds of thousands of Chinese.

Cover illustration of Liberation of Zhengzhou (解放鄭州), published by the Political Department of the Second Field Army, People's Liberation Army, 1949.

Zhengzhou also has a locomotive and rolling-stock repair plant, a tractor-assembly plant, and a thermal generating station. The city's industrial growth has resulted in a large increase in the population, coming predominantly from industrial workers from the north. A water diversion project and pumping station, built in 1972, has provided irrigation for the surrounding countryside. The city has an agricultural university.

In 1954, the Henan Provincial Government relocated from Kaifeng to Zhengzhou, making Zhengzhou the provincial capital, as a result of its railway transportation importance.

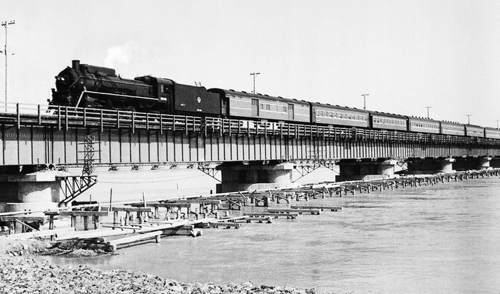
The Zhengzhou Yellow River Railway Bridge on the day of its reopening following restoration, August 2, 1958.

Li Keqiang became the Communist Party Secretary of Henan province in 1998. As part of his advocacy for urbanisation, Li sought to position Zhengzhou as an engine for regional and national growth. During the 2010s, Zhengzhou's GDP averaged a 13.2% yearly increase. Between 2010 and 2018, its population doubled.

In July 2021, record breaking floods left over a million people displaced and at least 300 people dead.

== Geography ==
Located just north of the province's centre and south of the Yellow River, Zhengzhou borders Luoyang to the west, Jiaozuo to the northwest, Xinxiang to the northeast, Kaifeng to the east, Xuchang to the southeast, and Pingdingshan to the southwest. With the land within its administrative borders generally sloping down from west to east, Zhengzhou is situated at the transitional zone between the North China Plain to the east and the Song Mountains and Xionger Mountains to the west, which are part of the greater Qinling range. The city centre is situated to the south of the middle reach of the Yellow River, where its valley broadens into the great plain. Zhengzhou is at the crossing point of the north–south route skirting the Taihang Mountains and the mountains of western Henan. The prefecture spans 34° 16' ~ 34° 58 N latitude and 112° 42' ~ 114° 14' E longitude, covering a total area of 7,567 square kilometres (2,922 sq mi), including the metropolitan area, which covers 1,284.89 km^{2} (496.1 sq mi), and the city centre, which occupies 709.69 square kilometres (274.0 sq mi).

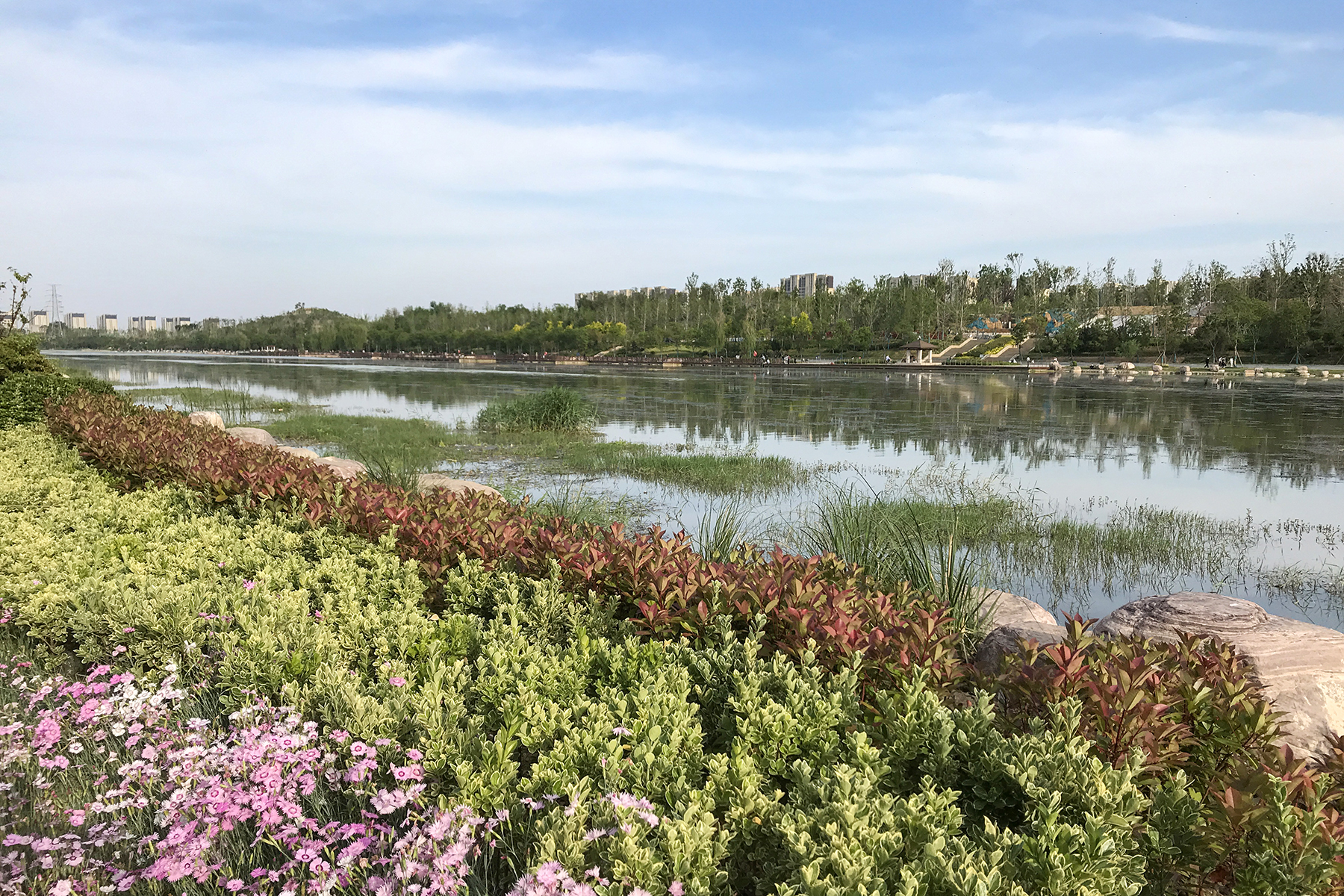
Jialu River, a tributary of the Huai River, flows through Zhengzhou

A section of the Yellow River passes by the northern edges of the urban area, extending 150.4 km (93.5 mi) within Zhengzhou prefecture. However, Jialu River, a secondary tributary of the Huai River, is Zhengzhou's main urban river and flood channel. The Jialu enters Zhengzhou from Xinmi to the southwest, and turns to the southeast within the city. Mountains loom over the western counties of Gongyi and Dengfeng while the easternmost county of Zhongmu is a vast, fertile floodplain, with the counties in between being hilly transitions.

=== Climate ===
Zhengzhou experiences a monsoon-influenced, four-season humid subtropical climate (Köppen climate classification Cwa), with cool, dry winters and hot, humid summers. Spring and autumn are dry and somewhat abbreviated transition periods. The city has an annual mean temperature of 15.4 °C (59.7 °F), with the monthly 24-hour average temperature ranging from 1.0 °C (33.8 °F) in January to 27.8 °C (82.0 °F) in July. The frost-free period lasts on average 220 days. Extremes since 1951 have ranged from −17.9 °C (0 °F) on 2 January 1955, 27 December 1971 and 1 February 1990 to 43.0 °C (109 °F) on 19 July 1966.

Rainfall is primarily produced by the monsoonal low during summer; in winter, when the vast Siberian High dominates due to radiative cooling from further north, the area receives little precipitation. During the summer season, the city is also often affected by tropical depressions, which bring additional amounts of rain. The annual precipitation is about 630 millimetres (25 in). With monthly percent possible sunshine ranging from 37 percent in January to 49 percent in April and May, the city receives 1,905 hours of sunshine per year, which is around 43% of the possible total.

Climate data for Zhengzhou, elevation 110 m (360 ft), (1991–2020 normals, extremes 1951–present)
Month	Jan	Feb	Mar	Apr	May	Jun	Jul	Aug	Sep	Oct	Nov	Dec	Year
Record high °C (°F)	21.9 (71.4)	28.3 (82.9)	32.8 (91.0)	38.7 (101.7)	41.0 (105.8)	42.5 (108.5)	43.0 (109.4)	40.6 (105.1)	38.1 (100.6)	34.6 (94.3)	29.8 (85.6)	27.0 (80.6)	43.0 (109.4)
Mean maximum °C (°F)	15.0 (59.0)	19.1 (66.4)	26.5 (79.7)	32.3 (90.1)	35.8 (96.4)	38.3 (100.9)	37.8 (100.0)	35.9 (96.6)	33.7 (92.7)	29.2 (84.6)	23.7 (74.7)	16.5 (61.7)	39.2 (102.6)
Mean daily maximum °C (°F)	6.1 (43.0)	10.0 (50.0)	15.9 (60.6)	22.6 (72.7)	27.9 (82.2)	32.2 (90.0)	32.4 (90.3)	30.8 (87.4)	27.1 (80.8)	21.8 (71.2)	14.6 (58.3)	8.2 (46.8)	20.8 (69.4)
Daily mean °C (°F)	1.0 (33.8)	4.3 (39.7)	10.1 (50.2)	16.6 (61.9)	22.3 (72.1)	26.7 (80.1)	27.8 (82.0)	26.4 (79.5)	21.8 (71.2)	16.1 (61.0)	8.9 (48.0)	3.1 (37.6)	15.4 (59.8)
Mean daily minimum °C (°F)	−3.0 (26.6)	−0.3 (31.5)	4.9 (40.8)	10.8 (51.4)	16.5 (61.7)	21.3 (70.3)	23.8 (74.8)	22.6 (72.7)	17.4 (63.3)	11.4 (52.5)	4.4 (39.9)	−1.1 (30.0)	10.7 (51.3)
Mean minimum °C (°F)	−8.2 (17.2)	−6.2 (20.8)	−1.6 (29.1)	3.3 (37.9)	10.2 (50.4)	16.3 (61.3)	19.8 (67.6)	17.4 (63.3)	11.7 (53.1)	4.3 (39.7)	−2.3 (27.9)	−6.5 (20.3)	−8.7 (16.3)
Record low °C (°F)	−17.9 (−0.2)	−17.9 (−0.2)	−13.7 (7.3)	−4.9 (23.2)	3.1 (37.6)	10.3 (50.5)	15.1 (59.2)	11.9 (53.4)	5.0 (41.0)	−1.5 (29.3)	−13.1 (8.4)	−17.9 (−0.2)	−17.9 (−0.2)
Average precipitation mm (inches)	10.1 (0.40)	12.8 (0.50)	19.3 (0.76)	37.0 (1.46)	58.1 (2.29)	65.1 (2.56)	139.1 (5.48)	137.4 (5.41)	78.2 (3.08)	38.9 (1.53)	27.2 (1.07)	8.1 (0.32)	631.3 (24.86)
Average precipitation days (≥ 0.1 mm)	3.8	4.1	5.3	5.7	6.5	7.3	10.8	10.3	8.5	6.3	5.4	3.3	77.3
Average snowy days	4.2	3.3	1.6	0.2	0	0	0	0	0	0	1.2	2.8	13.3
Average relative humidity (%)	57	57	54	57	57	58	73	76	71	65	62	56	62
Mean monthly sunshine hours	117.0	128.2	167.9	194.5	211.8	195.9	166.1	163.1	147.3	148.9	136.4	127.6	1,904.7
Percentage possible sunshine	37	41	45	49	49	45	38	40	40	43	44	42	43
Source 1: China Meteorological Administration all-time January high
Source 2: Weather China

In 2019, there were 177 good days in Zhengzhou, an increase of 9 days year-on-year, and 48.5% of the good days reached the standard. There were 24 days of heavy pollution, 9 days less than last year.

=== 2021 flood ===
On 20 July 2021, "The heaviest hour of rainfall ever reliably recorded in China crashed like a miles-wide waterfall over the city of Zhengzhou on 20 July, killing at least 300 people, including 14 who drowned in a subway tunnel." Although an emergency alert was issued the day before the flood, businesses and subways remained open. From 4pm to 5pm on 21 July, 7.95 inches of rain fell. A collapsed retaining wall allowed water to pour into subway tunnels. "The Chinese government now appears to be acknowledging missteps by local officials, as well as the possibility that severe weather events will become increasingly common."

== Administration and demography ==
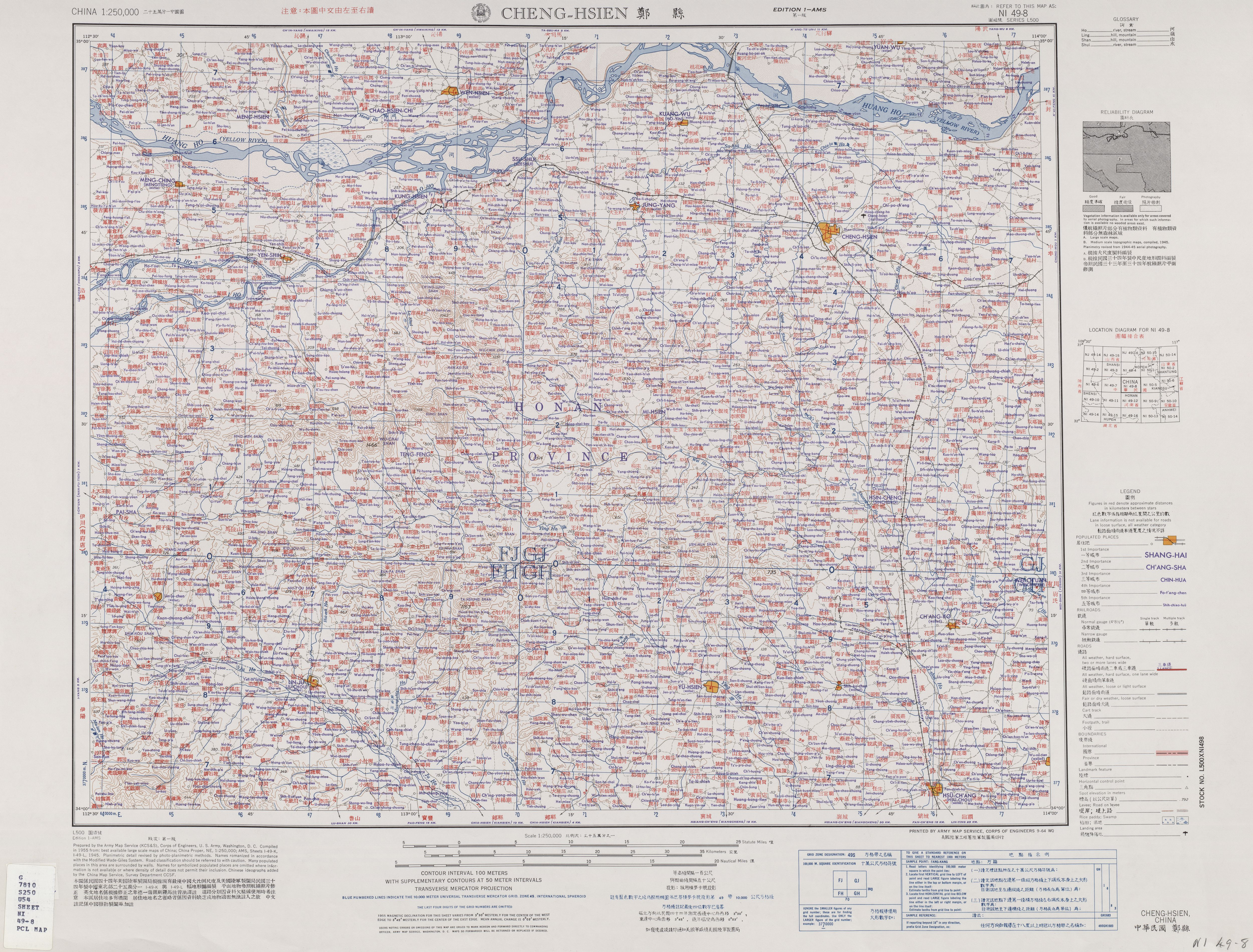
Map including Zheng County (labeled as 鄭縣 CHENG-HSIEN (walled)) (AMS, 1955)

Zhengzhou is divided into 6 urban districts, 5 county-level cities and 1 county. These subdivisions are likely to undergo significant changes in the near future due to increasingly rapid urban expansion and urban planning.

The prefecture-level city is home to 12,600,574 inhabitants (2020 census), and 10,260,667 in its built up area made of 6 urban and suburban districts: Xingyang, Xinzheng and Zhongmu are largely being urbanized, making the city one of the main built-up areas of the province.

Map
Name	Simplified Chinese	Hanyu Pinyin	Population (2021)	Area (km^{2})
City proper
Jinshui District	金水区	Jīnshuǐ Qū	1,618,600	136.66
Erqi District	二七区	Èrqī Qū	1,063,200	156.2
Huiji District	惠济区	Hùijì Qū	559,500	232.8
Guancheng Hui District	管城回族区	Guǎnchéng Huízú Qū	821,900	107
Zhongyuan District	中原区	Zhōngyuán Qū	965,300	97.1
Jingkai District	经开区	Jīngkāi Qū	342,600	402
Gaoxin District	高新区	Gāoxīn Qū	556,800	99
Zhengdong New Area	郑东新区	Zhèngdōng Xīnqū	960,200	96.02
Hangkonggang District	航空港区	Hángkōnggǎng Qū	650,600	747
Suburban
Shangjie District	上街区	Shàngjiē Qū	200,900	61.73
Satellite cities
Xingyang	荥阳市	xíngyáng Shì	732,500	943
Xinzheng	新郑市	Xīnzhèng Shì	1,200,200	701.76 (excluding Hangkonggang District)
Dengfeng	登封市	Dēngfēng Shì	732,200	1217
Xinmi	新密市	Xīnmí Shì	827,100	1001
Gongyi	巩义市	Gǒngyì Shì	802,400	1043
Rural
Zhongmu County	中牟县	Zhōngmù Xiàn	708,000	834

== Main sights ==
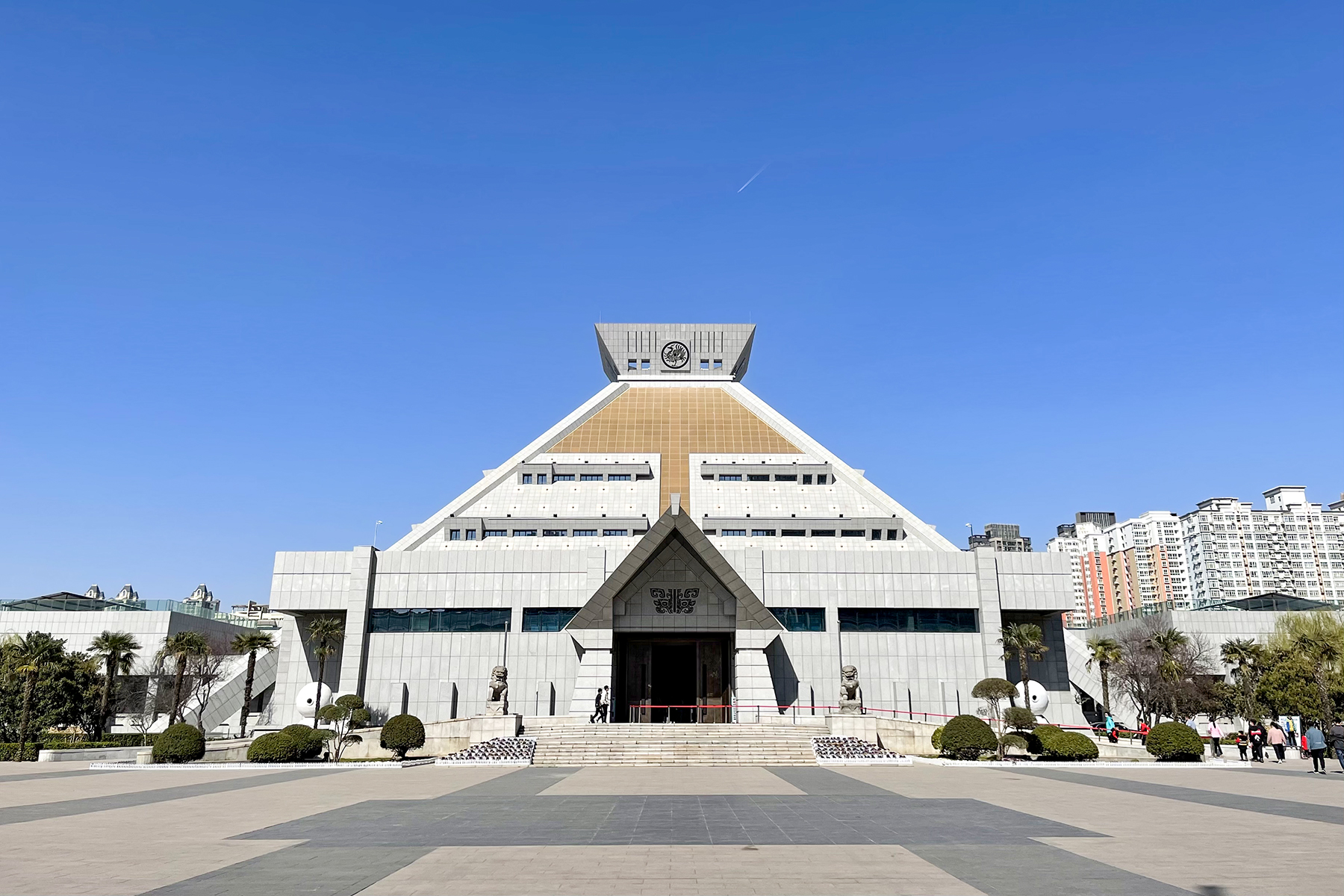
Henan Museum

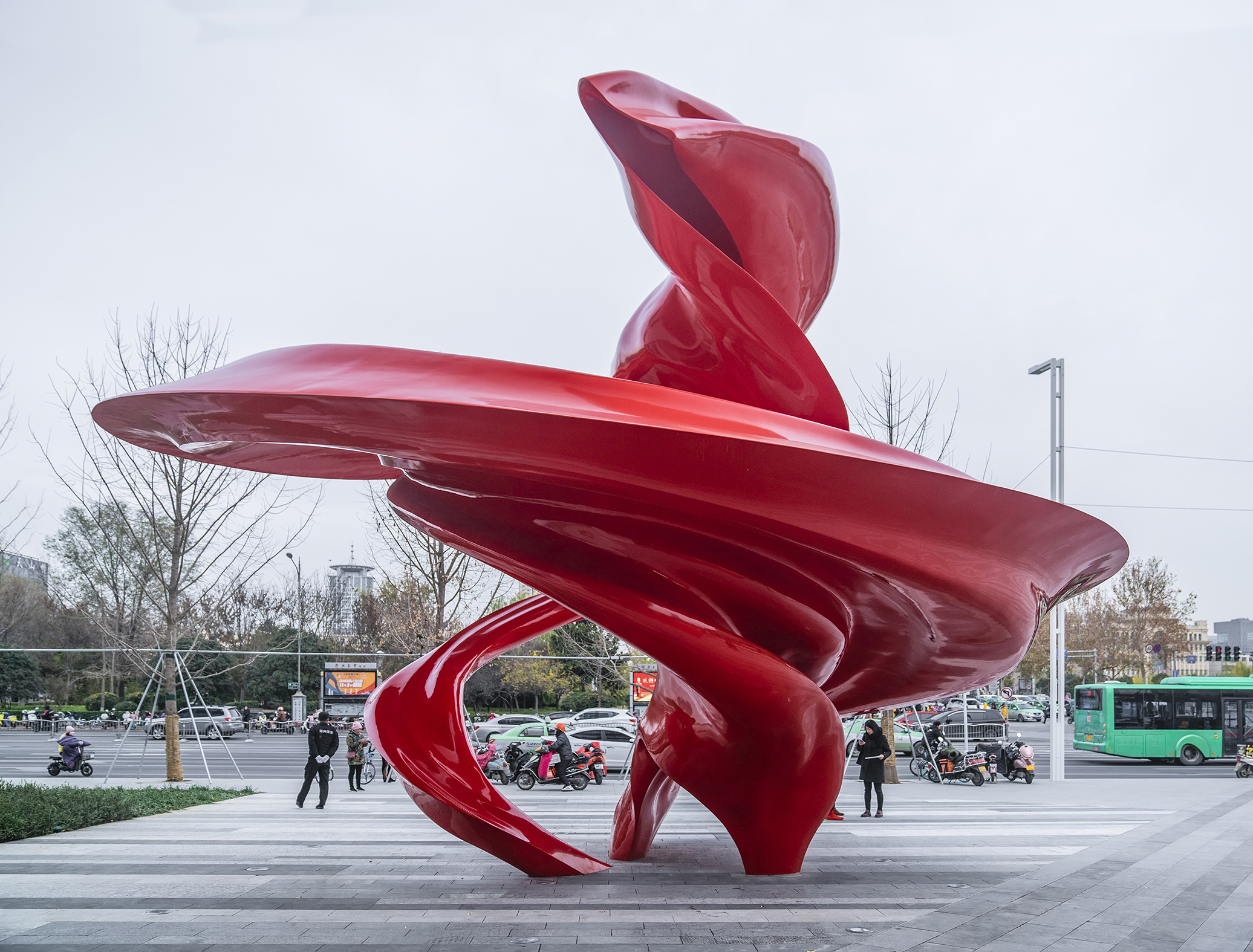
Between Heaven and Earth by Christian de Vietri

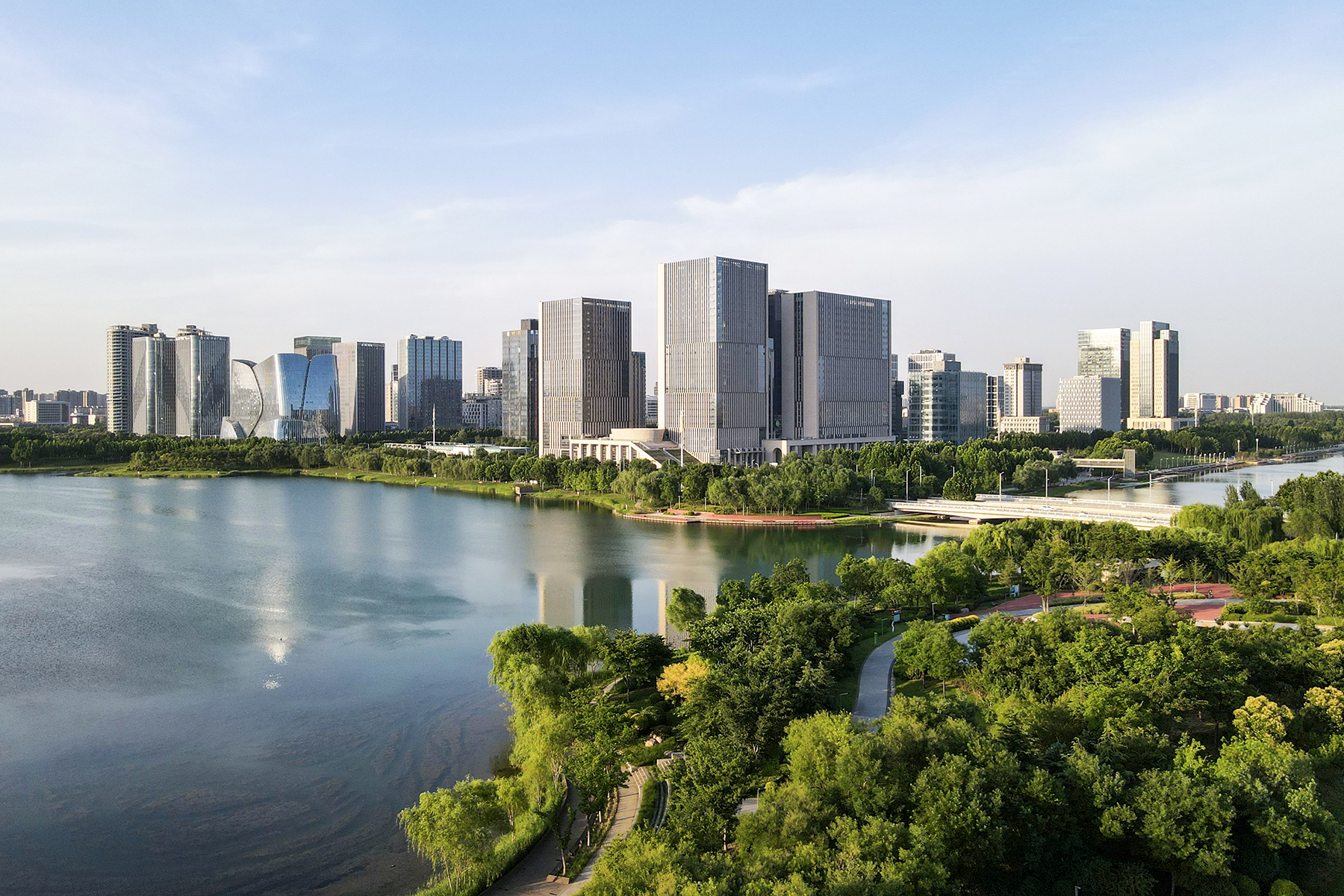
Longzihu area

Zhengzhou was the capital of China during the Shang dynasty. Parts of the Shang-era capital city wall that were built 3,600 years ago still remain in Downtown Zhengzhou (see Zhengzhou Shang City). Zhengzhou maintains abundant cultural heritages that reflect its history as well as the culture of Henan Province. Zhengzhou Confucius Temple, initially built during the Eastern Han dynasty 1900 years ago, is one of the oldest Confucian Temples in China. Other important architectural heritage sites in the city center include Town God Temple and Erqi Memorial Tower.

One internationally known tourist attraction is the Shaolin Monastery (少林寺), which is in Dengfeng, about 90 kilometres (56 miles) southwest of downtown Zhengzhou (1.5 hours by coach). The Shaolin Monastery is not only known as one of China's most important Buddhist shrines, but also as the ancient centre of Chinese Kung-fu. Shaolin Monastery and its famed Pagoda Forest were inscribed as a UNESCO World Heritage Site in 2010.

Zhengzhou City God Temple is one of the historic temples in Zhengzhou and is located in the old part of the city. It was originally built during the Ming Dynasty and has been rebuilt several times throughout its history. The temple is known for its traditional Chinese architecture, including its wooden buildings, courtyards, and decorative roofs. Today, it is a popular place for people to learn about Zhengzhou's traditional culture and local history. During traditional festivals, the temple area can become especially lively, with cultural activities and local events.

The Henan Museum is one of China's most important museums. It has a collection of more than 130,000 cultural objects includes exhibitions from prehistoric times (such as dinosaur fossils and prehistoric human remains) through to the modern era.

Zhengzhou's most developed and modern area is the Zhengdong New Area, which is in the eastern part of the city. It is home to some of the tallest skyscrapers in Zhengzhou, including the 280 metres (918.6 ft) tall Zhengzhou Greenland Plaza ("Big Corn"), which is one of the most prominent landmarks in Zhengzhou, and the twin towers of Zhengzhou Greenland Central Plaza (285 metres (935.0 ft)), which are currently the tallest skyscrapers in the city. The tallest structure in Zhengzhou is the 388-meter height Zhongyuan Tower, located on Hanghai East Road in the south of Zhengdong New Area. It is used as a television tower, with a revolving restaurant and an observation deck. The tower is among the tallest towers in the world.

Zhengzhou Zoo (郑州动物园) is located on Huayuan Road (花园路).

The newly built Zhengzhou Botanic Garden is at the western edge of Zhengzhou city.

Main attractions of Zhengzhou include:

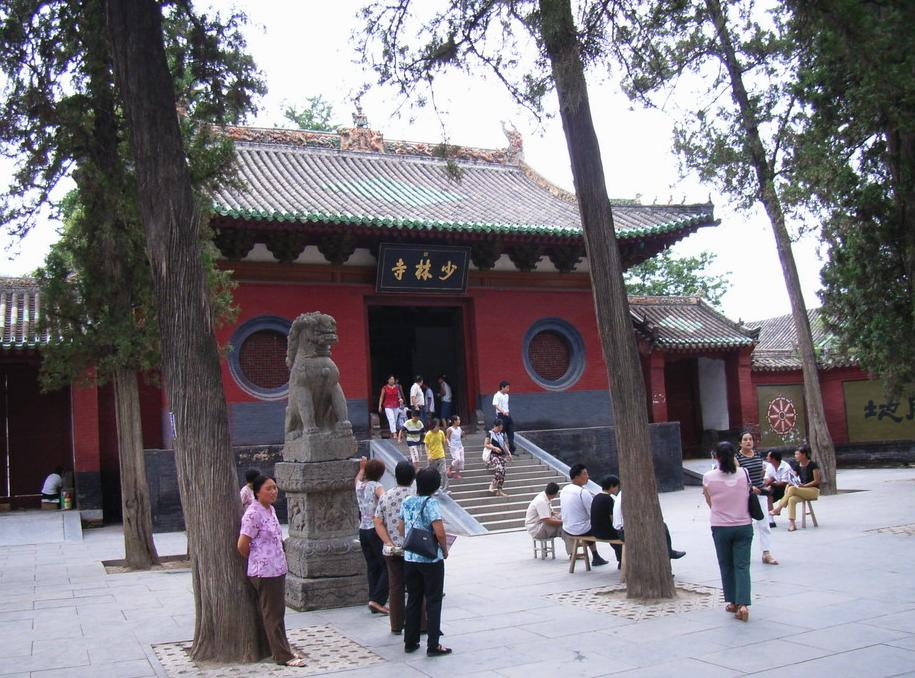
Shaolin Temple (birthplace of Chinese Kung Fu)

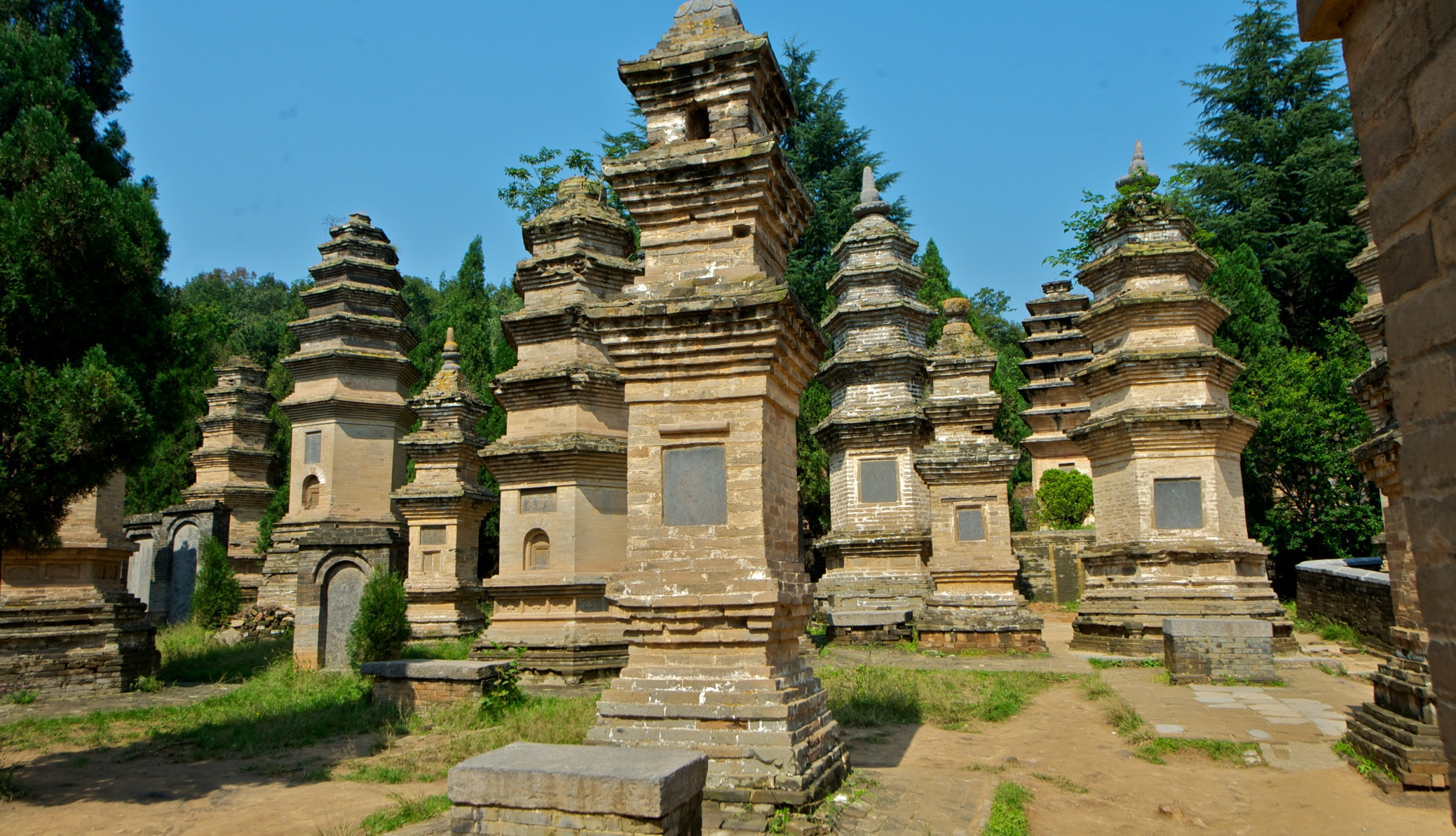
Pagoda Forest at Shaolin Temple (Historical site)

- Mount Song (UNESCO Global Geopark)
- Shaolin Monastery and Pagoda Forest (UNESCO World Heritage Site)
- Dengfeng Observatory (UNESCO World Heritage Site)
- Songyue Pagoda (UNESCO World Heritage Site)
- Yellow River Scenic Area

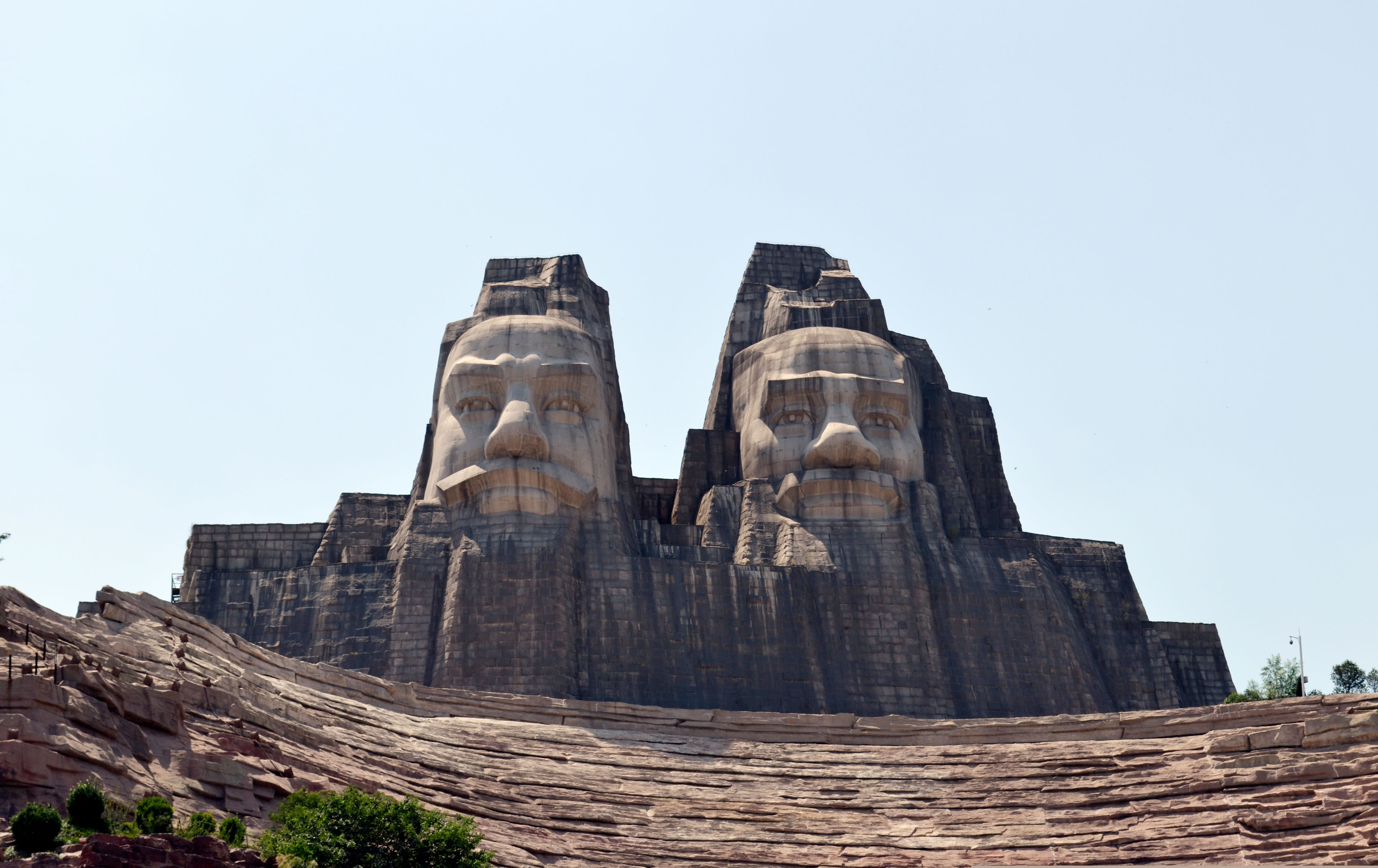
The statues of the Yan Emperor and the Yellow Emperor at Zhengzhou Yellow River Scenic Area

- Dahuting Han Dynasty tombs

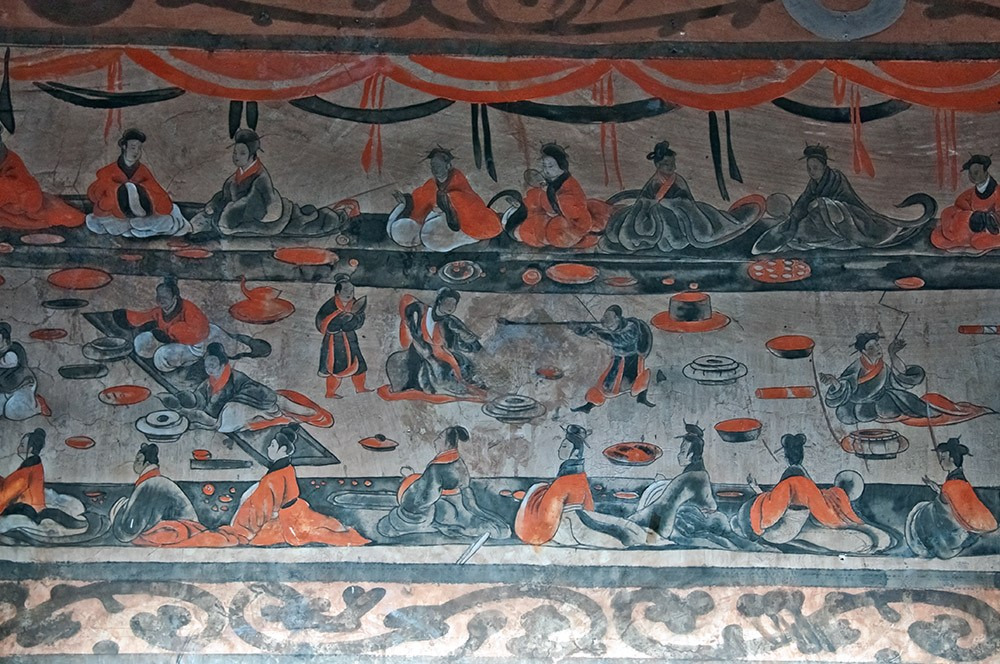
Mural Painting from Han Dynasty

- Mausoleums of the Song dynasty

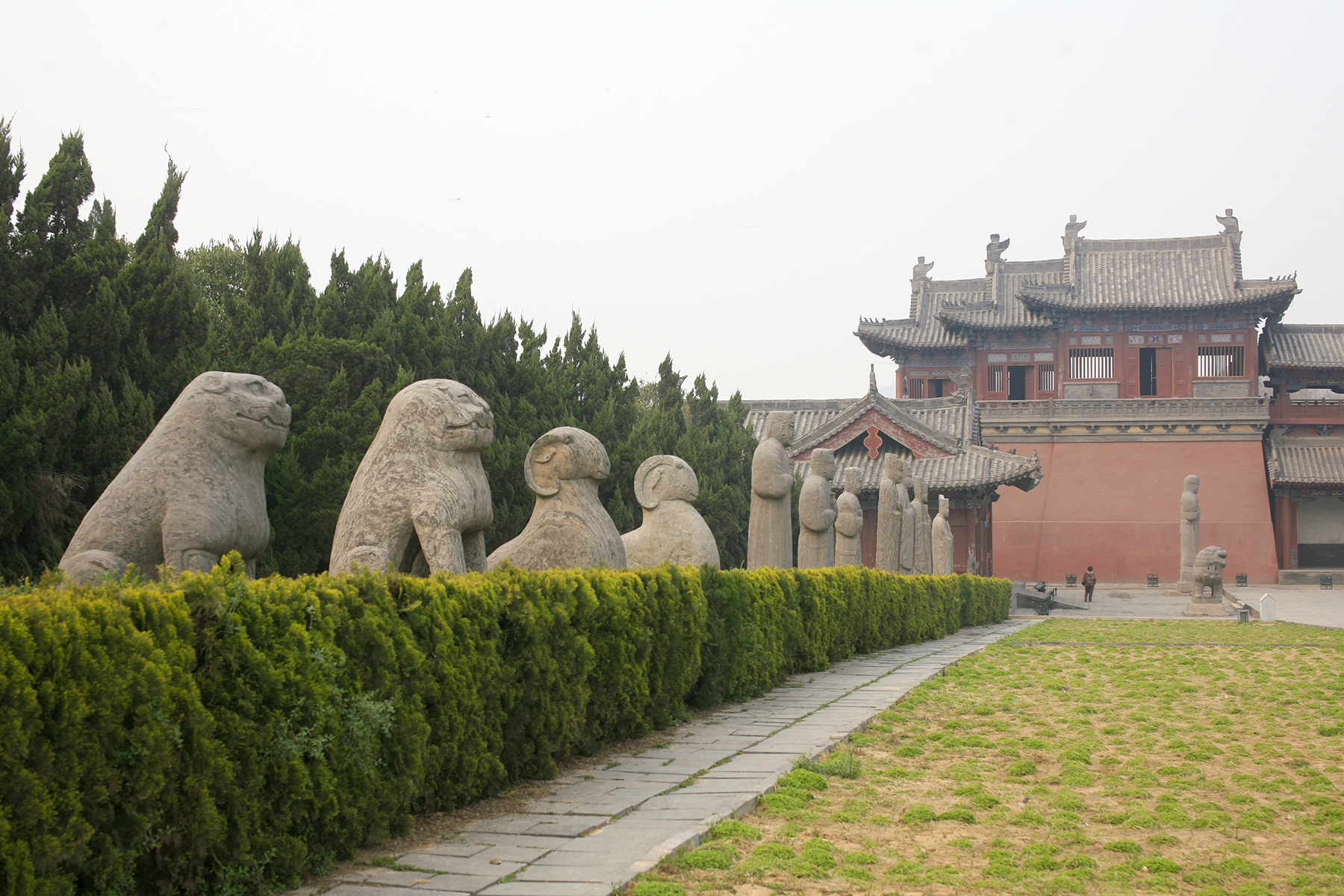
Mausoleums of the Song dynasty (Historical site)

- Kang Baiwan's Mansion

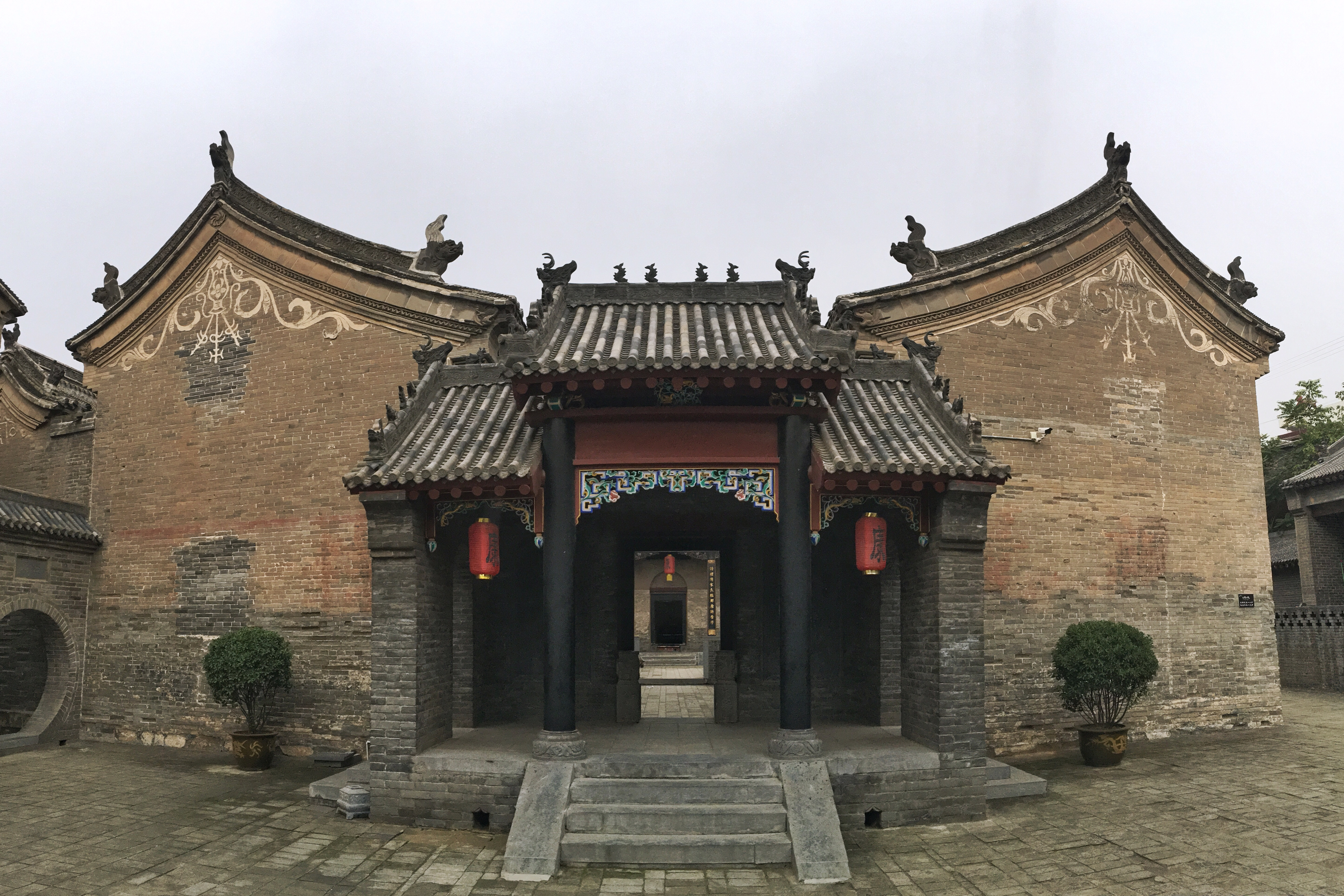
Kang Baiwan's Mansion (Historical site)

- the birthplace of Yellow Emperor
- Erqi Memorial Tower
- Henan Museum
- Zhongyuan Tower
- Zhengzhou Shang City

== Economy ==
Zhengzhou, along with Xi'an, Chengdu, Chongqing and Wuhan, are some of the most economically important cities in inland China. Zhengzhou is the economic center of the province and the surrounding areas such as southeastern Shanxi and southwestern Shandong. Due to its strategic location in one of the most populous areas in the world (nearly 100 million people in Henan alone) and in China's railway, road and aviation transport networks, Zhengzhou is increasingly attracting domestic and international investment as well as migrants from other areas, transforming the city into one of the largest economic centers in China. In 2018, total GDP of Zhengzhou was ¥1020 billion, ranked 17th in China. And in 2021, total GDP was ¥1269.1 billion, ranked 16th in China. In the first half of 2026, the GDP of city was reached 777.27 billion RMB.

=== Agriculture ===
By the end of 2006, Zhengzhou had a total population of over 7 million, of which 2.88 million lived in rural areas. Its main products include apples, paulownia, tobacco, maize, cotton, and wheat. In addition, Zhengzhou also produces Yellow River carp, Zhengzhou watermelons, Xinzheng jujube, Xingyang dried persimmons, Guangwu Pomegranate and Zhongmu garlic, all of which are specialties that are rarely found outside the region.

=== Mining and manufacturing ===
Zhengzhou and the surrounding area have large reserves of coal and other minerals. Coal mining and electricity generation are traditionally important in the local economy.

Zhengzhou has been one of the major industrial cities in The People's Republic of China since 1949. The city's staple industry is textiles. Others manufactured items include tractors, locomotives, cigarettes, fertilizer, processed meats, agricultural machinery, and electrical equipment. Some high-tech companies in new material, electronics and biotechnology are also growing rapidly during the recently years, especially in the high-tech industrial park in the northwest of the city.

- Yutong, China's largest bus producer.
- Shaolin Bus, a well-known small-to-medium-sized bus producer.
- Dongfeng Nissan, specializing in the manufacture of SUVs and pickup trucks.
- Haima Automobile Zhengzhou, an automobile manufacturer specializing in manufacturing microvans and light passenger vehicles.
- Zhengzhou Unique Industrial Equipment Co., Ltd., a large tractor and agricultural equipment manufacturer.
- Foxconn Zhengzhou, located in Zhengzhou Airport Economy Zone, is the largest smartphone production site in the world and is also known as "iPhone City".
- Sanquan Food, a frozen food company. With over 20,000 employees, Sanquan produced the first frozen dumplings and rice balls in China.
- Synear Food Holdings Limited, along with Sanquan Food, is one of the largest producers of frozen food in China. The market share is over 20% in China
- BYD Auto opened one of its largest manufacturing plants in 2023, which by 2025 employed 60,000 workers.

=== Services ===
The service industries of Zhengzhou include retail, wholesale, hospitality, finance, exhibition, transport and delivery, tourism, and education. With a number of domestic and international institutions having regional offices in the city, Zhengzhou is becoming the financial center in central China. Zhengzhou Commodity Exchange (ZCE) is one of the only four future exchanges (inc. Shanghai Futures Exchange and Dalian Commodity Exchange and China Financial Futures Exchange) in China and is becoming an important global player specialised in agricultural future exchange. Equipped with newly built facilities such as Zhengzhou International Conference and Exhibition Center. Third party logistics (3PL) in Zhengzhou has also been experiencing industrial boom during the past few years. As a transit and tourist center of Henan Province and central China, Zhengzhou is the center of Henan cuisine.

- Dennis, a regional retail chain.
- Henan Jianye, a large real estate developer, which owns the China Super League club Henan Jianye F.C.

=== Economic development zones ===
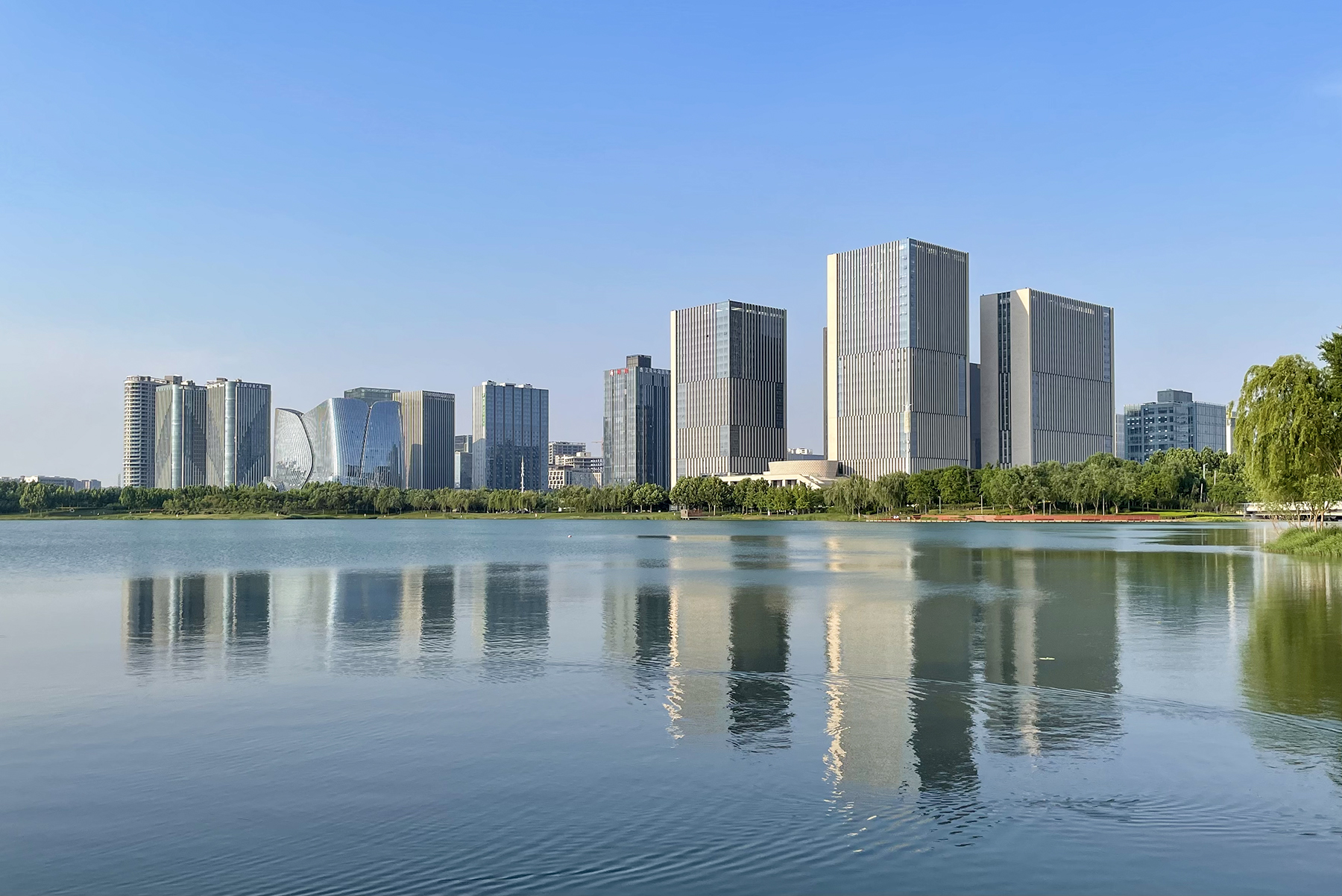
Longzihu area, located in Jinshui District

The Zhengdong New Area (Chinese: 郑东新区), literally Eastern Zhengzhou New Area, similar to Hangzhou Bay New Area in Ningbo and Hangzhou Bay New Area in Ningbo, is one of dozens of major economic zones that are currently developing in various regions of China. Established in 2003 by the provincial and municipal governments, it has become the financial center of Henan province and one of the most rapidly growing areas of China.

Kisho Kurokawa, a Japanese world-renowned planner and architect, was appointed to design the overall planning scheme for Zhengdong New Area. He brought in advanced ideas including ecological city, co-existing city, metabolic city and ring city ideas. The scheme won the "Prominent Award for City Planning Design" at the first session of Annual Meeting of the World Architects Alliance in 2002. Zhengdong New Area is mainly constituted by the CBD area, the Longhu commercial and residential area, the Longzihu college area, and the Zhengzhou East railway station commercial area.

=== Industrial zones ===
- Zhengzhou New & Hi-Tech Industries Development Zone

Zhengzhou High & New Technology Industries Development Zone was established in 1988, and approved by the state Council of PRC to be a state development zone on Mar.6,1991. It was appraised to be advanced high tech zone of China respectively in 1993, 1998 and 2002. The Zone currently covers a total area of 18.6 square kilometres (7.2 square miles). An extension plan was approved by Zhengzhou Municipal Government, the various construction work started in 2004. Under the development strategy of "multiple parks in one zone", the Zone has been making great efforts to promote the development of software, information technologies, new materials, bio-pharmaceutical and photo-machinery-electronic industries.

- Zhengzhou Economic and Technological Development Zone

Zhengzhou Economic and Technological Development Zone was approved as state-level development zone on 13 February 2000. The zone has a developed area of 7 square kilometres (3 square miles) Industries encouraged include Electronics Assembly & Manufacturing, Telecommunications Equipment, Trading and Distribution, Biotechnology/Pharmaceuticals, Instruments & Industrial Equipment Production, Medical Equipment and Supplies, Shipping/Warehousing/Logistics and Heavy Industry.

- Zhengzhou Export Processing Area

Zhengzhou (Henan) Export Processing Zone was established on 21 June 2002 with approval by the state council. Its planned area is 2.7 square kilometres (1.0 square mile). Zone A is located in Zhengzhou National Economic & technological Development Area and began to operate on 1 June 2004. The area of land developed is 0.893 square kilometres (0.345 square miles) at present. Zone B is located in Zhengzhou Airport Area and is adjacent to Zhengzhou Xinzheng International Airport on the north and it covers a planned area of 5 square km with bonded logistics zone, bonded processing zone and supporting industry zone, etc.

== Transportation ==
Zhengzhou is located in the central part of China and is a main national transport hub.

=== Public transit ===
==== Metro ====
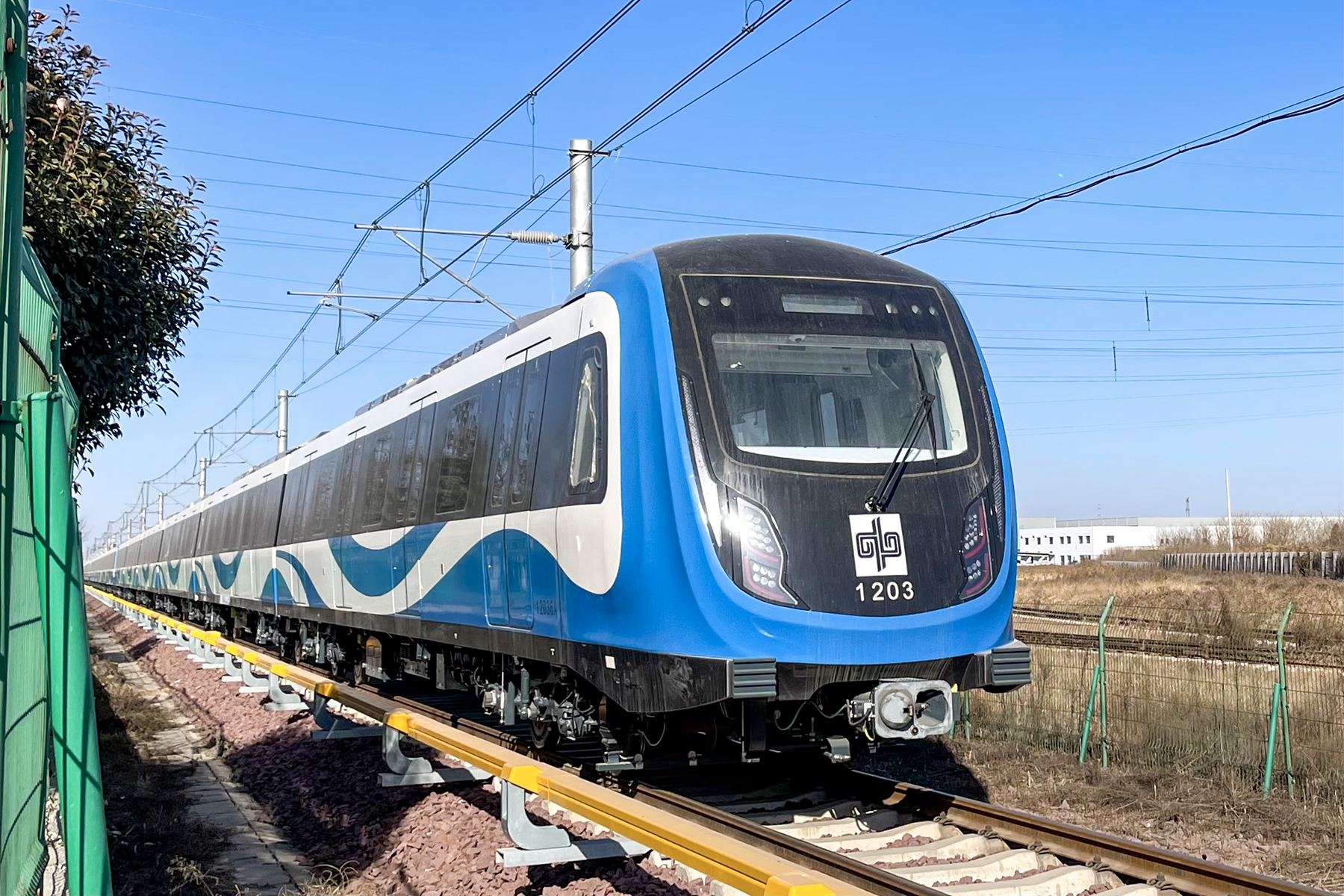
A Zhengzhou Metro Line 12 train

The Zhengzhou Metro is a rapid transit metro rail network serving urban and suburban districts of the Zhengzhou metropolitan area. The system started operation on 28 December 2013. As of 2026, it currently has 13 lines in operation, creating a 450 km (280 mi) long network. The first two lines (Line 1 and Line 2) were approved by the National Development and Reform Commission in Feb. 2009. Construction of the two lines started in 2009 and 2010, and were finished in 2013 and 2015 respectively. The Chengjiao Line (planned to be part of Line 9), which is now in through operations with Line 2, allows the system to serve the Zhengzhou Xinzheng International Airport. A total of 21 metro lines have been planned to connect all areas in Great Zhengzhou Metropolitan Area.

As of 2026, Zhengzhou Metro operates 13 lines with a total operating length of 450 km, namely Lines 1–8, 10, 12 and 14, the Suburban Line, and the Zhengxu Line. Line 6 Phase I became fully operational on 30 November 2024, when its northeast section entered initial operation, while Line 7 Phase I and Line 8 Phase I opened on 29 December 2024. Zhengzhou's updated rail transit network plan, approved by the municipal government in May 2025, envisions 22 lines totaling about 1,260 km by 2035 and 30 lines totaling about 1,600 km by 2050.

The Zhengzhou subway fares has a segmented pricing system. The starting price is 2 yuan ($0.28) for a ride of up to 6 kilometers. If the mileage exceeds 6 kilometers, the principle of "decreasing for further distances" will apply. Within the mileage of 6 to 13 kilometers, 1 yuan ($0.14) will be added for every 7 kilometers, and for 8 kilometers between 13 and 21 kilometers, 1 yuan ($0.14) will be added. For each additional 9 kilometers above 21 kilometers, an additional 1 yuan ($0.14) is added. Riders can use cash, a physical metro card, or QR code payment available on Alipay or WeChat apps to pay for the ride.

==== Bus ====
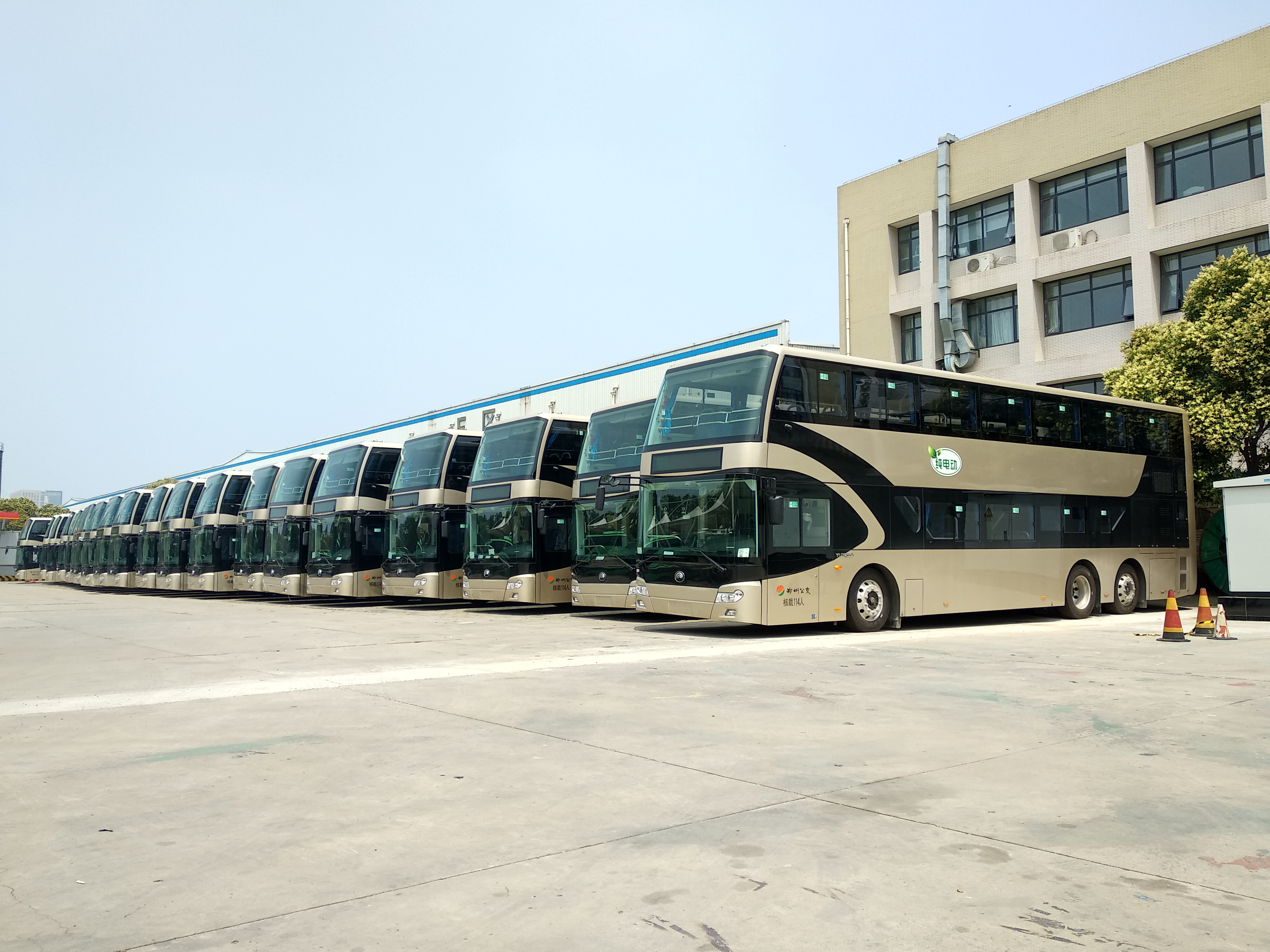
Yutong E12DD double-decker electric buses of Zhengzhou Bus at depot

Zhengzhou has a bus system with over 5,700 bus vehicles, operated by the Zhengzhou Bus Communication Corporation (ZZB).

The operations of Zhengzhou Bus Rapid Transit commenced in 2009. The system consists of 5 main routes (B1, B2, B3, B5 and B6) with dedicated bus lanes and dozens of branch routes that serve most areas of the city.

=== Railways ===
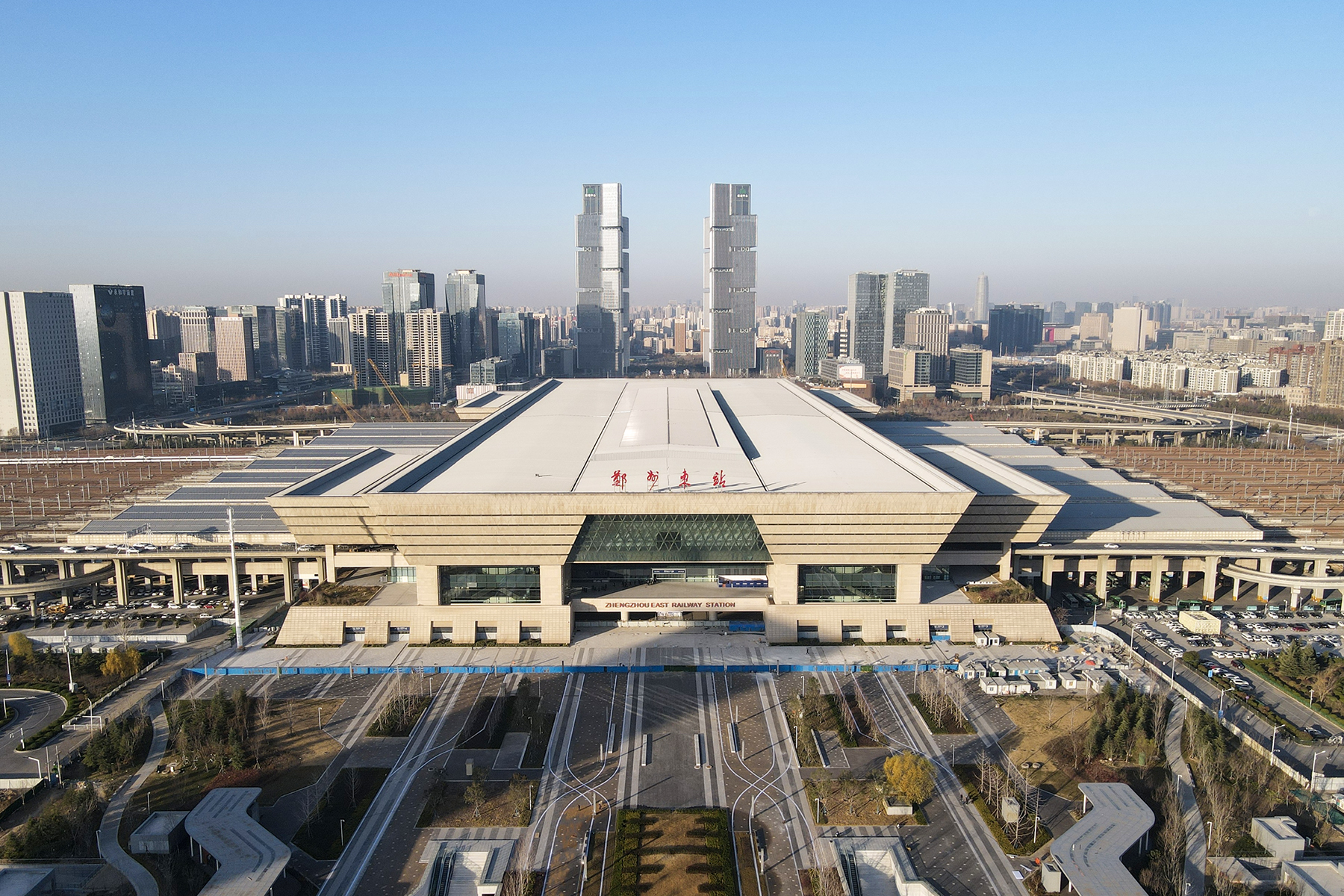
Zhengzhou East railway station, the main high-speed railway station in the city

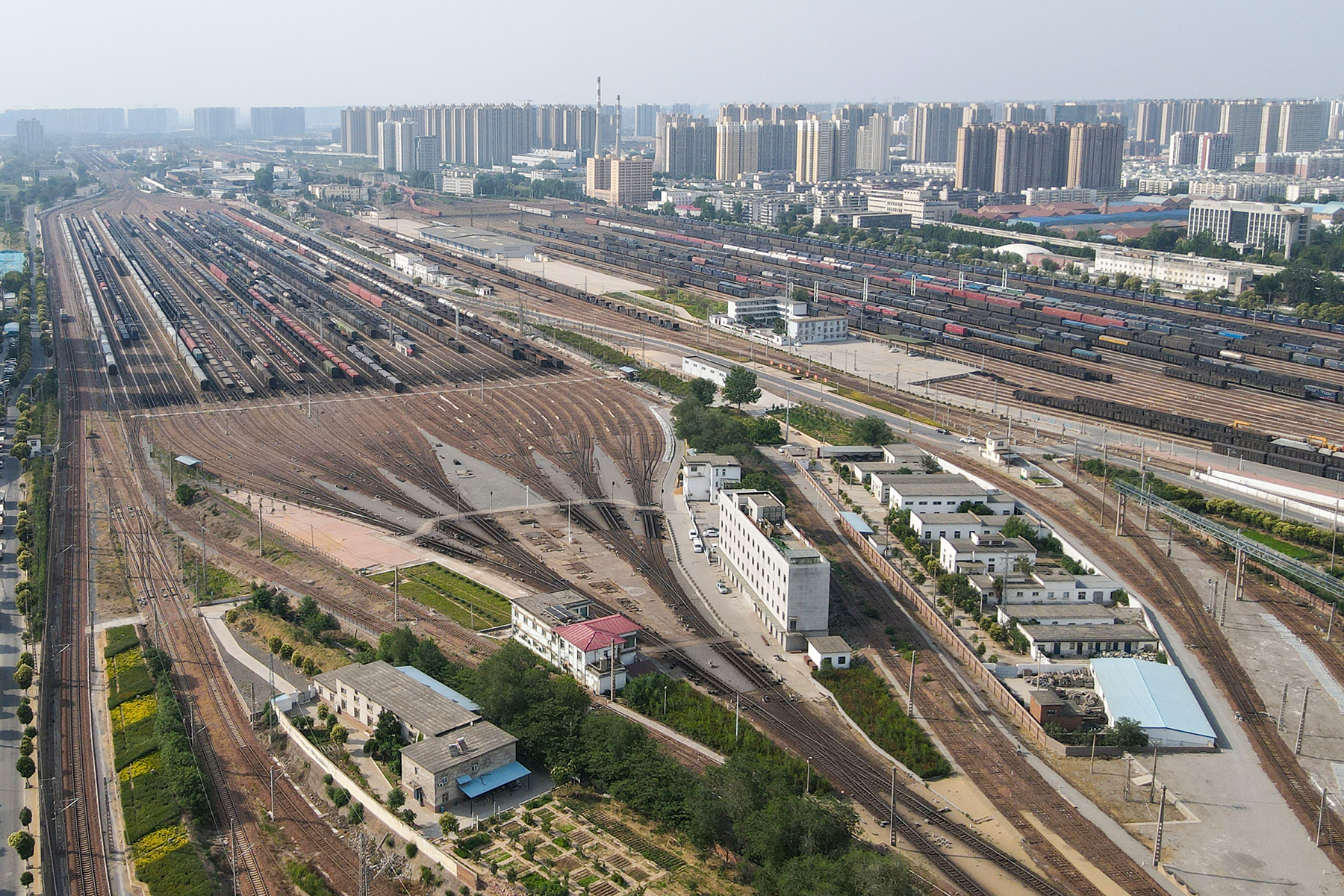
Zhengzhou North Classification Yard serves as the major transition hub of China Railway system

Zhengzhou is the junction of the Longhai Railway (Lianyungang, Jiangsu–Lanzhou, Gansu) and the Beijing–Guangzhou Railway as well as a major national railway hub. The main railway station for these conventional services is Zhengzhou railway station, opened in 1904.

Zhengzhou is also on the Beijing–Guangzhou–Shenzhen–Hong Kong high-speed railway and the Xuzhou–Lanzhou High-Speed Railway. The high-speed rail network provides fast train services to most major cities in China, including Beijing (2.5 hours), Guangzhou (6 hours), Xi'an (2 hours), Wuhan (2 hours), Shanghai (4 hours), Nanjing (3 hours), Hangzhou (5 hours), and Hong Kong (6.5 hours). Proposed high-speed railways from Zhengzhou to Chongqing, Hefei, Jinan and Taiyuan are under construction.

The completion of the Zhengzhou–Jinan high-speed railway, planned for 2023, will complete a star-shaped (referred to as a "米"-shaped) network of eight high-speed lines radiating out from the city.

Zhengzhou is also the hub of intercity railways in Henan. Currently there are three intercity railways from Zhengzhou: Zhengzhou–Kaifeng intercity railway, Zhengzhou–Jiaozuo intercity railway and Zhengzhou–Xinzheng Airport intercity railway are in operation.

Zhengzhou East railway station is dedicated to high-speed trains and is one of the largest in Asia and Zhengzhou Hangkonggang railway station is a new high-speed railway hub dedicated to Zhengzhou Airport Economy Zone.

Zhengzhou North railway station, over 6,000 metres (20,000 ft) long and over 800 metres (2,600 ft) wide, has been described as Asia's largest classification yard.

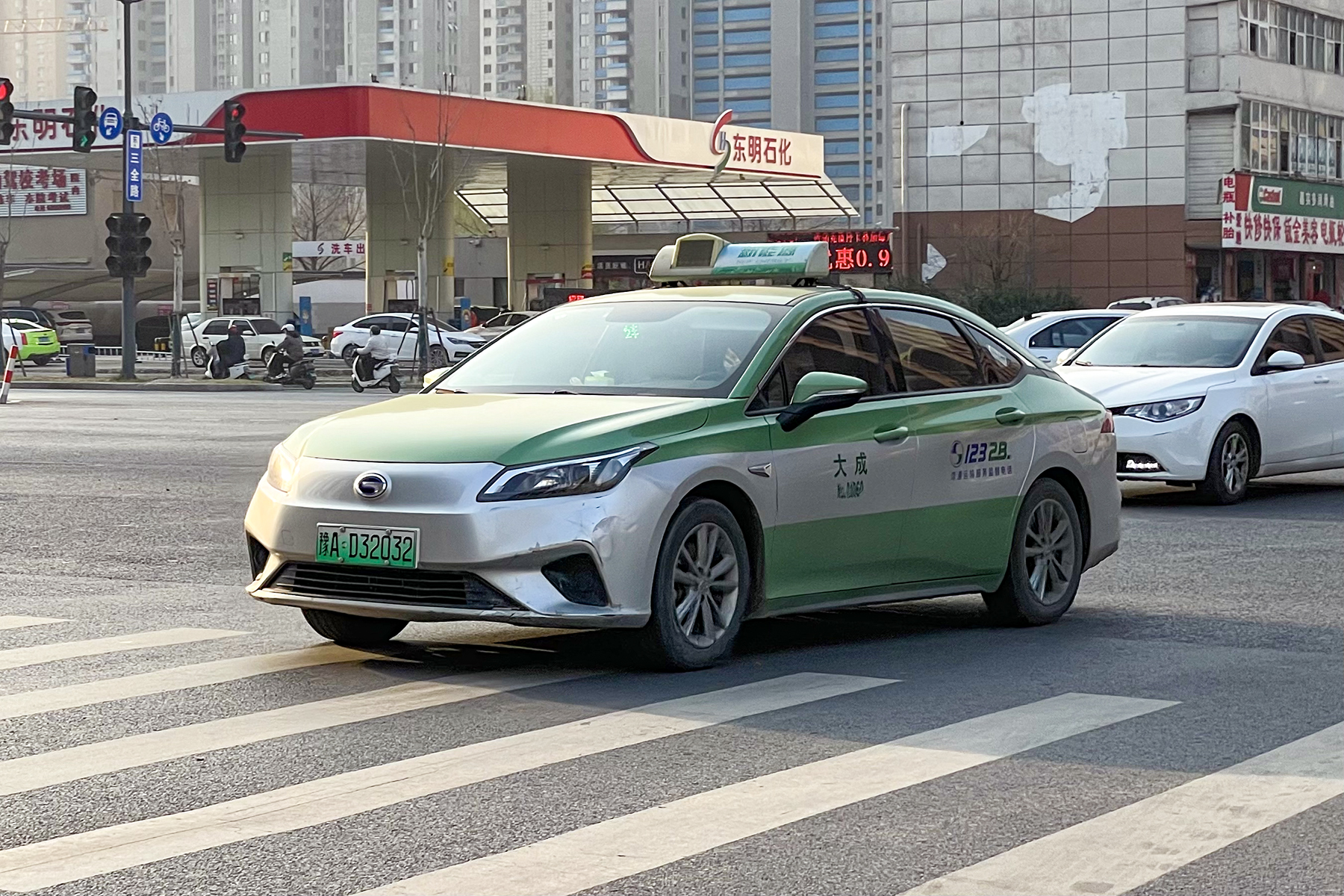
Aion S taxi in Zhengzhou

=== Roads and expressways ===
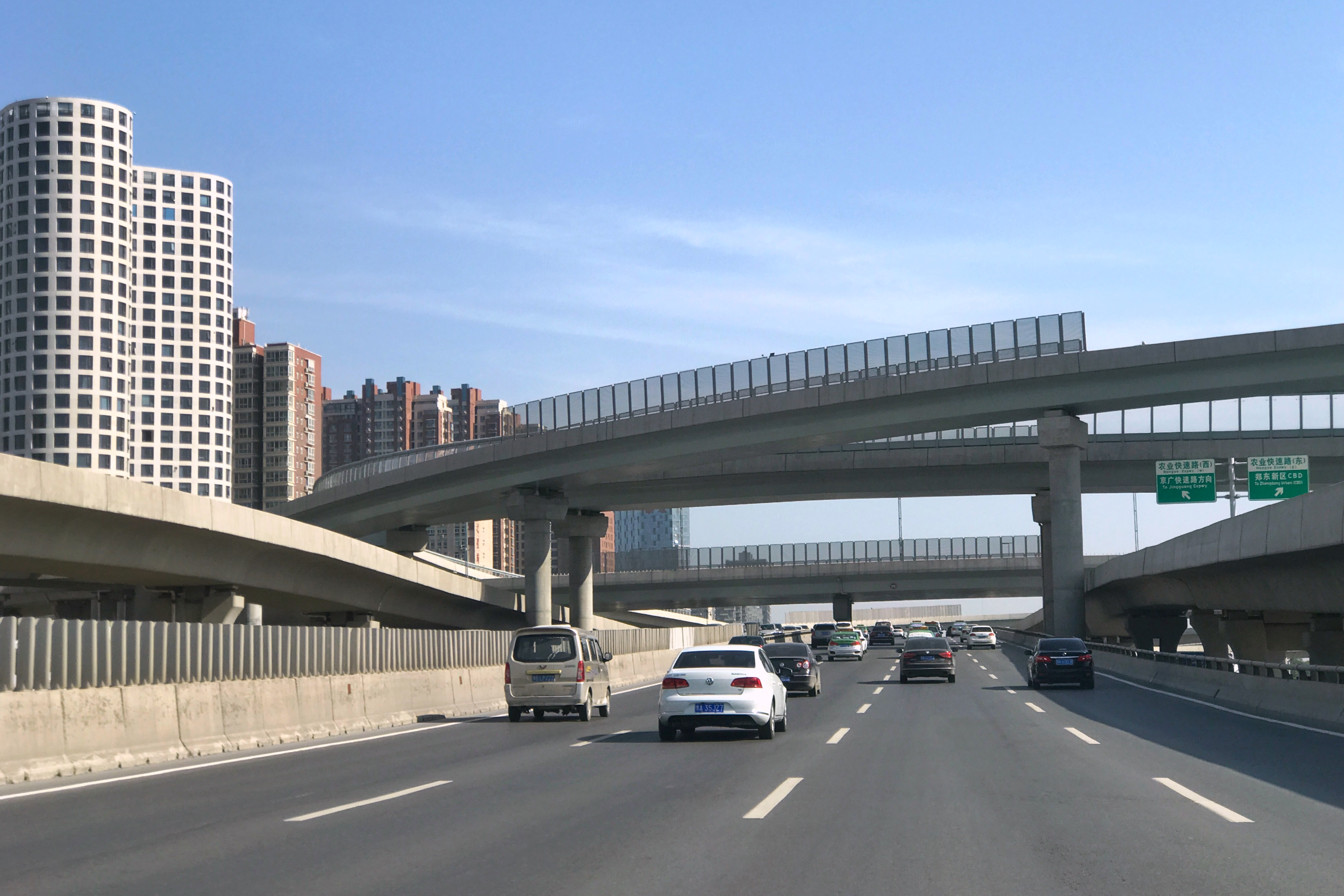
Zhongzhou Avenue and Nongye Expressway interchange

The surrounding area of Zhengzhou, along with the Yangtze River Delta, Pearl River Delta and the Bohai Economic Rim, has the highest highway density nationwide. Zhengzhou is the center of Henan expressway network that provides 1–2 hours road trip to surrounding cities of Kaifeng, Xinxiang, Xuchang, Jiaozuo and Luoyang. Other major cities within the province can be reached in 3 hours. The expressway network and national highways also links Zhengzhou to all major cities in the country.

There are several limited access express roads in the city center to relieve traffic problems. However, heavy congestion is still common in rush hours.

==== Expressways ====
- G4 Beijing–Hong Kong and Macau Expressway
- G30 Lianyungang–Khorgas Expressway
- G3001 Zhengzhou Ring Expressway
- S1 Zhengzhou Airport Expressway
- S32 Yongcheng–Dengfeng Expressway
- S49 Linzhou–Ruzhou Expressway
- S60 Shangqiu–Dengfeng Expressway
- S82 Zhengzhou–Minquan Expressway
- S85 Zhengzhou–Shaolinsi Expressway
- S87 Zhengzhou–Yuntaishan Expressway
- S88 Zhengzhou–Xixia Expressway
- S89 Zhengzhou Airport–Xihua Expressway

==== National highways ====
- China National Highway 107
- China National Highway 220
- China National Highway 310

==== Urban express roads ====
- 3rd Ring Road (Zhengzhou)
- 4th Ring Road (Zhengzhou)
- Jingguang Expressway
- Longhai Expressway
- Nongye Expressway
- Zhongzhou Avenue

=== Air ===
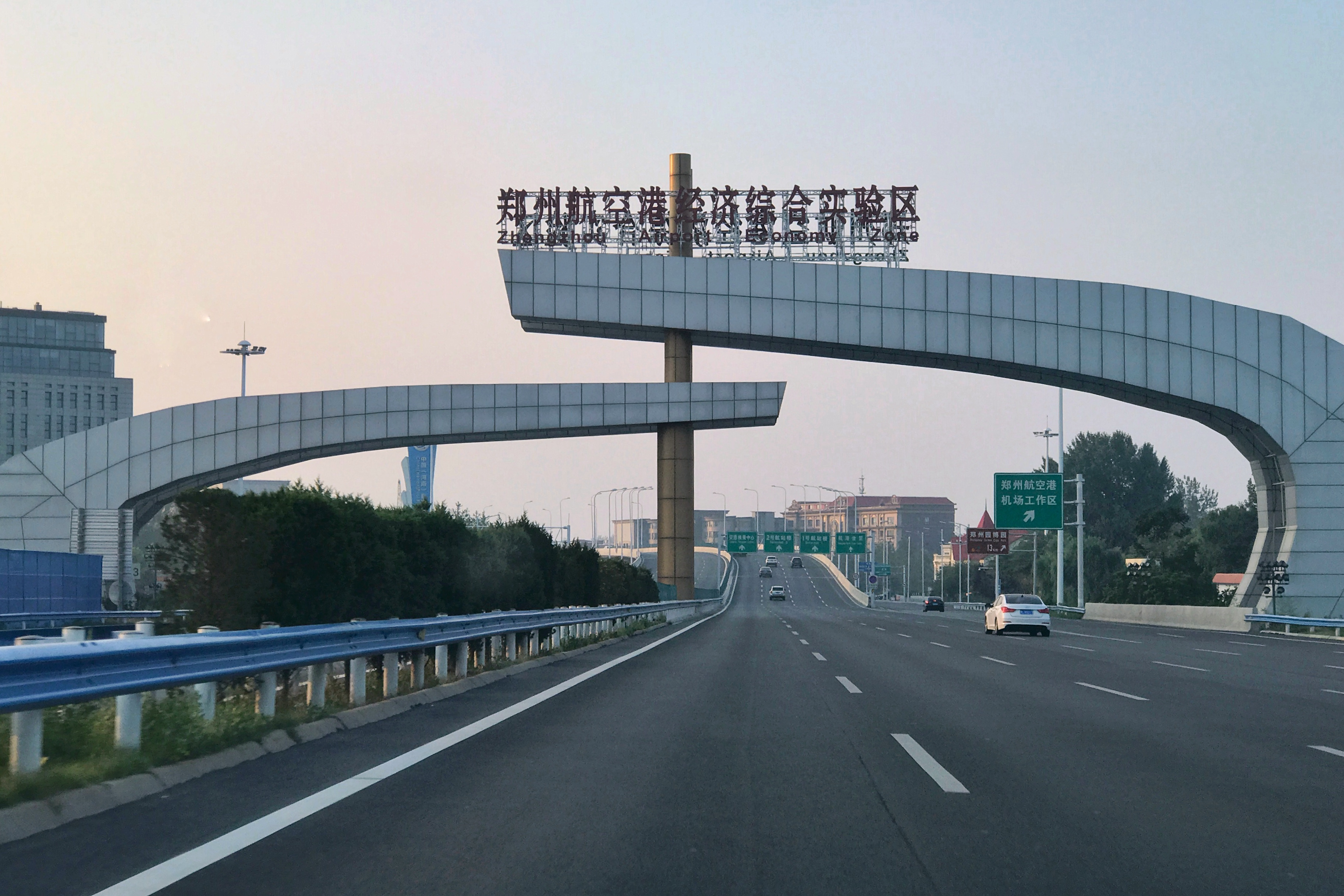
The sign of Zhengzhou Airport Economy Zone (ZAEZ) at Yingbin Elevated Road

Zhengzhou is primarily served by Zhengzhou Xinzheng International Airport (IATA: CGO, ICAO: ZHCC), which is 37 km (23 mi) southeast of the city center.

The airport is a focus city of China Southern Airlines, Lucky Air, West Air and Shenzhen Airlines. It used to be the headquarter for Henan Airlines. In 2017, it was the busiest airport in central China in both passenger and cargo traffic. It is also one of the eight air hubs nominated by the Civil Aviation Administration of China.

Other airports in Zhengzhou include Shangjie Airport (IATA: HSJ) which is for general aviation, and Matougang Airbase which is for military use.

== Colleges and universities ==
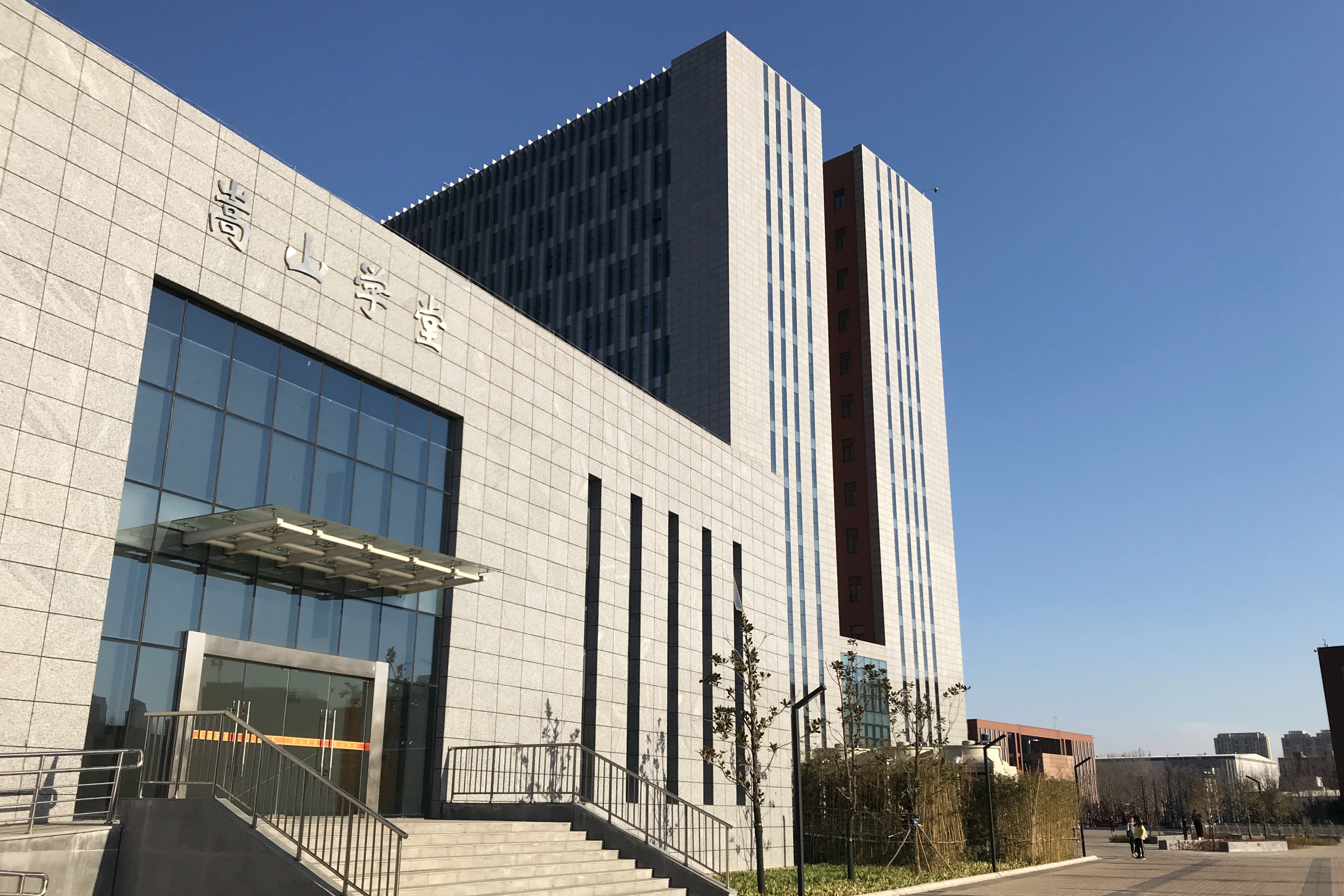
Songshan Hall of Zhengzhou Normal University in March 2019

Zhengzhou is a major city for scientific research, appearing among the world's top 60 cities in 2025 as tracked by the Nature Index. Longzi Lake is designated as a Higher Education Zone and 15 universities have relocated there.

=== Public ===
- Zhengzhou University
- Henan University (Longzi Lake campus)
- Henan Agricultural University
- Henan University of Technology (former Zhengzhou Institute of Technology)
- Henan University of Finance and Economics
- Zhongyuan Institute of Technology
- Zhengzhou University of Light Industry
- Zhengzhou Institute of Aeronautical Industry Management
- North China Institute of Water Conservancy and Hydroelectric Power
- Henan University of Traditional Chinese Medicine
- Henan Textile University (河南纺织专科学校)
- Zhengzhou Normal University
- Zhengzhou Institute of Technology (former Zhongzhou University, not to be confused with Henan University of Technology)
- Henan Institute of architecture technology (河南建筑职业技术学院)

=== Military ===
- PLA Information Engineering University (中国人民解放军信息工程大学)
- Air Defense Force Command Academy

=== Private ===
- Zhengzhou College of Economics
- Huanghe S&T University (Zijin Mountain Street Campus) (黄河科技大学) (紫金山南校区)
- Sias International University
- Shengda Economics, Trade and Management College of Zhengzhou

== Notable people ==
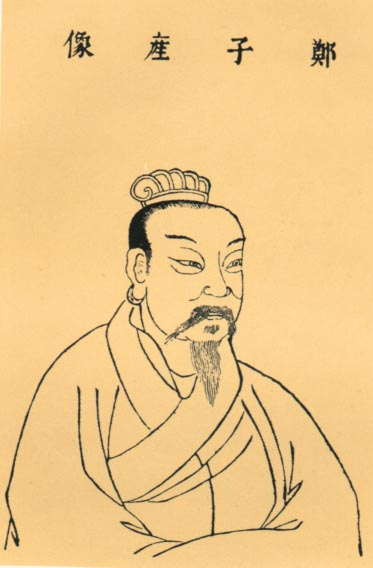
Portrait of Zichan

- Zichan (子产; ? – 552 BC), politician and philosopher of the State of Zheng during the Spring and Autumn period.
- Lie Yukou (列子; c. 450 BC – ?), known as Liezi, Taoism philosopher.
- Shen Buhai (申不害; c. 400 BC – c. 337 BC), politician and philosopher in Legalism.
- Han Fei (韩非; c. 280 BC – 233 BC), also known as Han Feizi, political philosopher of the Warring States Period.
- Du Fu (杜甫; 712–770), Tang dynasty poet, born in Gongyi, now a county under the administration of Zhengzhou.
- Bai Juyi (白居易; 772–846), Tang dynasty poet widely known for his poems featuring realism, born in Xinzheng.
- Li Shangyin (李商隐; c. 813–858), late Tang dynasty poet, born in Xingyang.
- Gao Gong (高拱; 1512–1578), politician of the Ming dynasty, born in Xinzheng.
- Wei Wei (魏巍; 1920–2008), modern era writer, widely known in China for his works on the Chinese Volunteer army's participation of the Korean War.
- Chang Xiangyu (常香玉; 1923–2004), Yu opera actress.
- Li Na (李娜; born 1963), Chinese folk singer.
- Li Jianying (李剑英; 1964–2006), hero pilot.
- Shi Yigong (施一公; born 1967), biophysicist, president of Westlake University and the former vice president of Tsinghua University.
- Hai Xia (海霞; born 1972), Chinese news anchor for China Central Television, the main state announcer of China.
- Deng Yaping (邓亚萍; born 1973), four-time table tennis Olympic champion.
- Liu Yang (刘洋; born 1978), pilot and astronaut who became the first Chinese woman in space.
- Tie Ya Na (帖雅娜; born 1979), table tennis player representing Hong Kong, born in Zhengzhou.
- Sun Tiantian (孙甜甜; born 1981), former professional tennis player on WTA Tour and 2004 Olympic Tennis champion (women's doubles with Li Ting), the first Chinese player to win a mixed doubles Grand Slam title at the 2008 Australian Open with Nenad Zimonjić.
- Du Wei (杜威; born 1982), professional footballer and the former captain of China national football team.
- Jiang Xin (蒋欣; born 1983), actress, famous for her role as Consort Hua in the TV series Empresses in the Palace.
- Gao Lin (郜林; born 1986), professional footballer.
- Shi Xiaolong (释小龙; born 1988), actor.
- Fan Pengfei (范朋飞; born 1992), Chinese singer, songwriter and musician in pop music.
- Ning Zetao (宁泽涛; born 1993), swimmer and gold medal winner at 2014 Asian Games and 2015 World Aquatics Championships.

== Politics ==
The current mayor is He Xiong from January 2022.

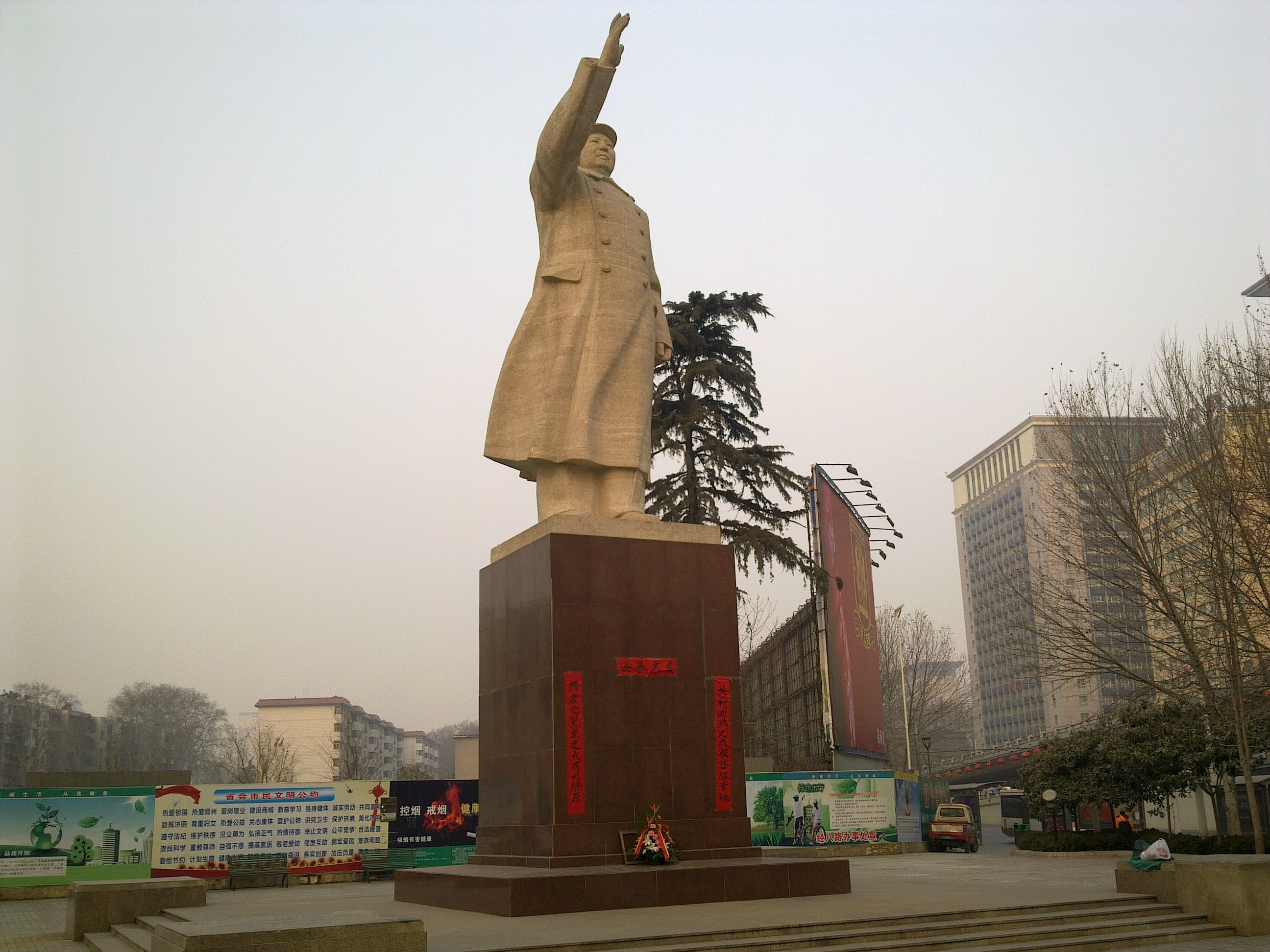
Statue of Mao Zedong in Zhengzhou

List of the CPC Party Chiefs of Zhengzhou:

1. Gu Jingsheng (谷景生): October 1948 – December 1948
2. Wu Defeng (吴德蜂): December 1948 – June 1949
3. Zhao Wucheng (赵武成): June 1949 – April 1953
4. Song Zhihe (宋致和): April 1953 – August 1956
5. Wang Lizhi (王黎之): August 1956 – January 1968
6. Wang Hui (王辉): March 1971 – January 1974
7. Zhang Junqing (张俊卿): January 1974 – December 1977
8. Yu Yichuan (于一川): December 1977 – December 1979
9. Li Baoguang (李保光): December 1979 – May 1983
10. Jiang Jinfei (蒋靳非): May 1983 – September 1984
11. Yao Minxue (姚敏学): September 1984 – August 1987
12. Cao Lei (曹磊): August 1987 – July 1990
13. Song Guochen (宋国臣): July 1990 – May 1992
14. Zhang Deguang (张德广): May 1992 – December 1995
15. Wang Youjie (王有杰): December 1995 – June 2001
16. Li Ke (李克): June 2001– January 2006
17. Wang Wenchao (王文超): January 2006 — July 2010
18. Lian Weiliang (连维良): July 2010 — December 2012
19. Wu Tianjun (吴天君): December 2012 — May 2016
20. Ma Yi (马懿): May 2016 — June 2019
21. Xu Liyi (徐立毅): June 2019 — January 2022
22. An Wei (安伟): January 2022 —

== Sister cities ==
Zhengzhou is twinned with:

Country	City	Since
Japan	Saitama City	12 October 1981
United States	Richmond, Virginia	14 September 1994
Romania	Cluj-Napoca	9 April 1995
South Korea	Jinju	25 July 2000
Namibia	Mariental	27 August 2001
Jordan	Irbid	31 January 2002
Russia	Samara	11 April 2002
Brazil	Joinville	17 November 2003
Germany	Schwerin	12 April 2006
Bulgaria	Shumen	27 April 2007
Belarus	Mogilev	12 June 2014

== See also ==
- Zhengzhou Ostrich Park
- Zhengzhou Shang City
- History of Zhengzhou
- List of historical capitals of China
- Zhengzhou Ferris Wheel
- Zhengzhou Foreign Language School
- New first-tier city
