= Zhengzhou College of Economics =

University in Zhengzhou, China

- 郑州经济专修学院
- Motto: Mingde, BoDa, Chuang Xin, Du Xing
- Motto in English: Behave admirably, empathetically, creatively and know thyself
- Established: 1999

Zhengzhou College of Economics (Chinese: 郑州经济专修学院; pinyin: Zhèngzhōu Jīngjì Zhuānxiū Xuéyuàn) is a progressive, privately held, business university situated within the Northern University City of Zhengzhou, Henan Province of the People's Republic of China. It is authorized by the Educational Department of Henan Province. Formerly the adult and continuing education division of Henan University of Finance and Economics, Zhengzhou College of Economics operates at a capacity of 2,400 students and was founded in 1999.

With the establishment of Zhengzhou's new CBD (Central Business District), trained personnel will be in even greater demand. To meet this need, over 300 part and full-time teachers deliver courses in 17 undergraduate majors including: Accounting, Advertising, Business English, Business Management, Computer Information Management, Economics, Finance, Fine Art, Graphic Design, Interior Design, Law, Logistics Management, Maritime Management, Marketing, Real Estate Management, Software Engineering and Tourism & Hospitality. Additionally, two graduate majors in Business Administration (MBA) and Information Systems (MIS) will be introduced for the 2010 / 2011 academic year. Senior level faculty members include Wen Ching Xin, Chen Bao Quan, Zhao Gui Shean, and Wang Jian Ping. The new CBD will be home to a new, 27 hectares (67 acres) international campus of Zhengzhou College of Economics, set to be operational by September 2010 and fully completed by September 2012.

The motto of Zhengzhou College of Economics transliterates as, "Mingde, BoDa, Chuang Xin, Du Xing" and translates as, "Behave admirably, empathetically, creatively and know thyself".
