= G3001 Zhengzhou Ring Expressway =

Road in Zhengzhou, China

Zhengzhou Ring Expressway
- 郑州绕城高速公路
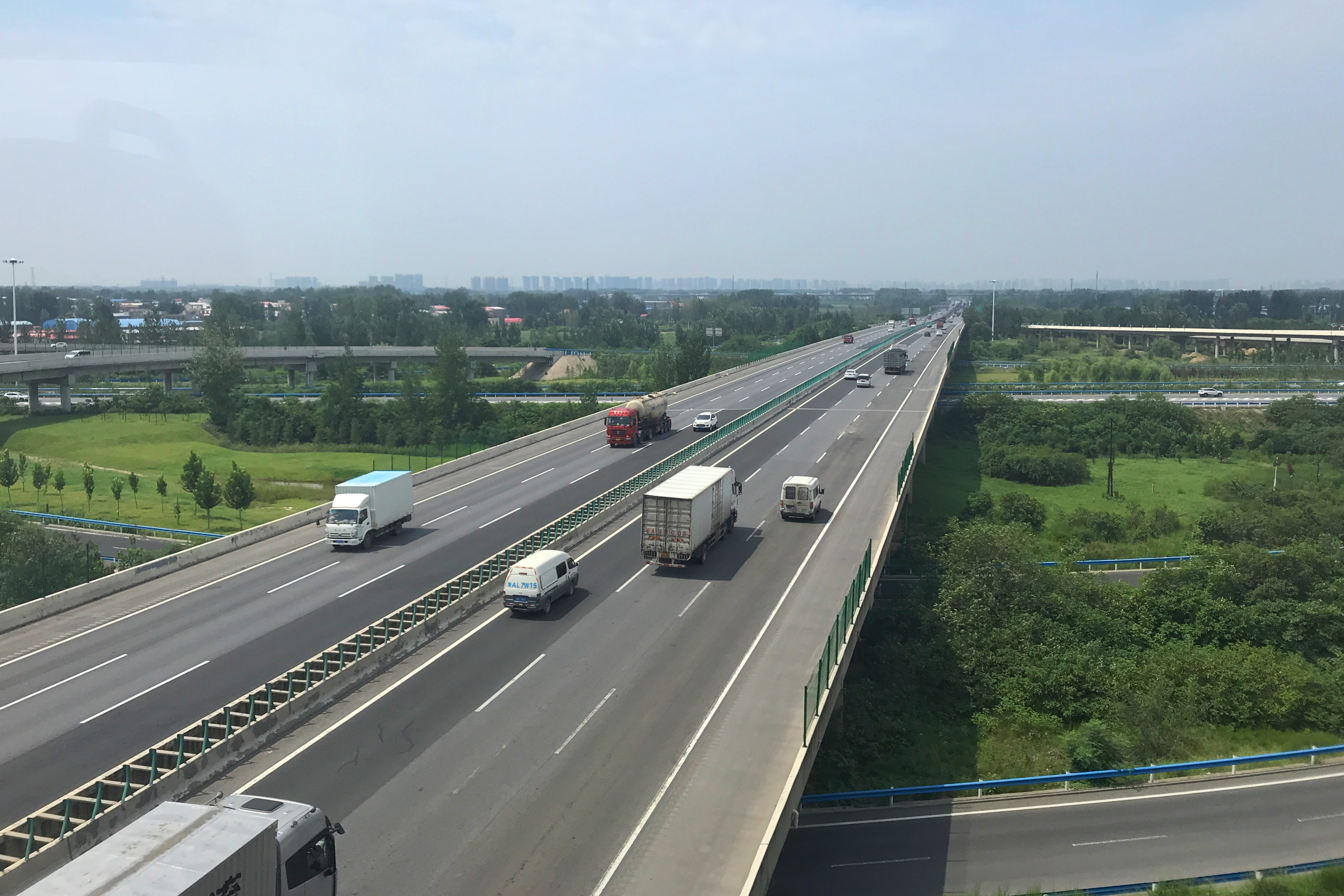
- Zhengzhou Southwest Ring Expressway

Route information
- Length: 106 km (66 mi)

Major junctions
- G30 / Henan S87 in Xingyang, Zhengzhou; Henan S85 in Erqi District, Zhengzhou; Henan S88 in Erqi District, Zhengzhou; Henan S1 in Guancheng Hui District, Zhengzhou; G4 / Henan S82 in Zhongmu County, Zhengzhou; G4 / G30 in Jinshui District, Zhengzhou

Location
- Country: China

Highway system
- National Trunk Highway System; Primary; Auxiliary; National Highways; Transport in China
← G30	→ G3002

The Zhengzhou Ring Expressway (Chinese: 郑州绕城高速公路), designated as G3001, is a 106-kilometre-long expressway (66 mi) in Zhengzhou, Henan, China.

== History ==
The north section, which is in concurrency with G30 Lianyungang–Khorgas Expressway, was finished in 1995 as a section of the Kaifeng-Luoyang Expressway, which is one of the earliest expressways in Henan. The east section is in concurrency with G4 Beijing–Hong Kong and Macau Expressway, and was finished in 2004.

The south and west section, also known as Zhengzhou Southwest Ring Expressway, was finished in August 2005.

== Route ==
The expressway forms a circle around the city of Zhengzhou. It consists of 3 parts: the Zhengzhou Southwest Ring Expressway at south and west, the G4 Beijing–Hong Kong and Macau Expressway at east and the G30 Lianyungang–Khorgas Expressway to the north.

== Road Conditions ==
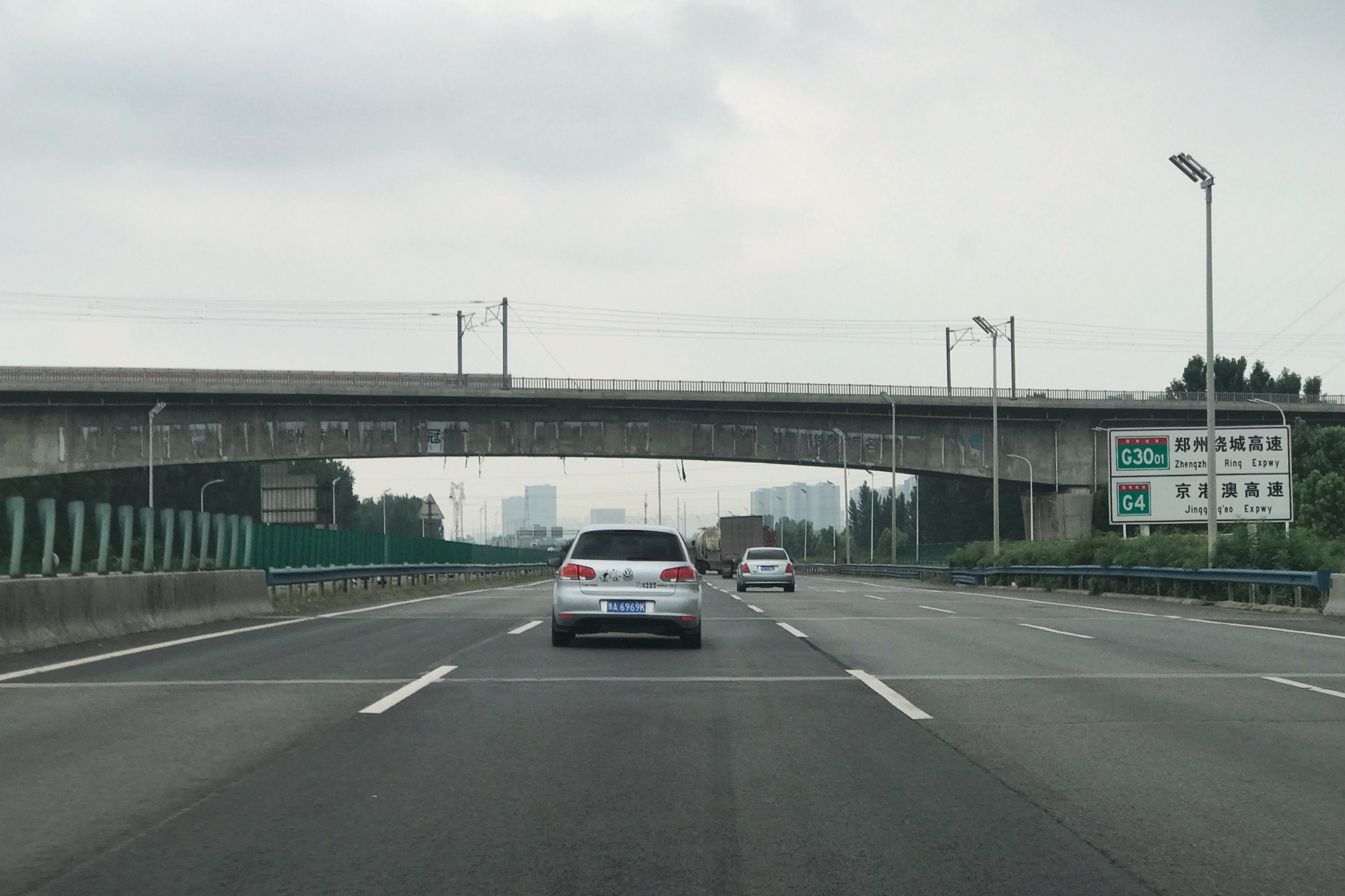
East section of the expressway (G4 concurrency)

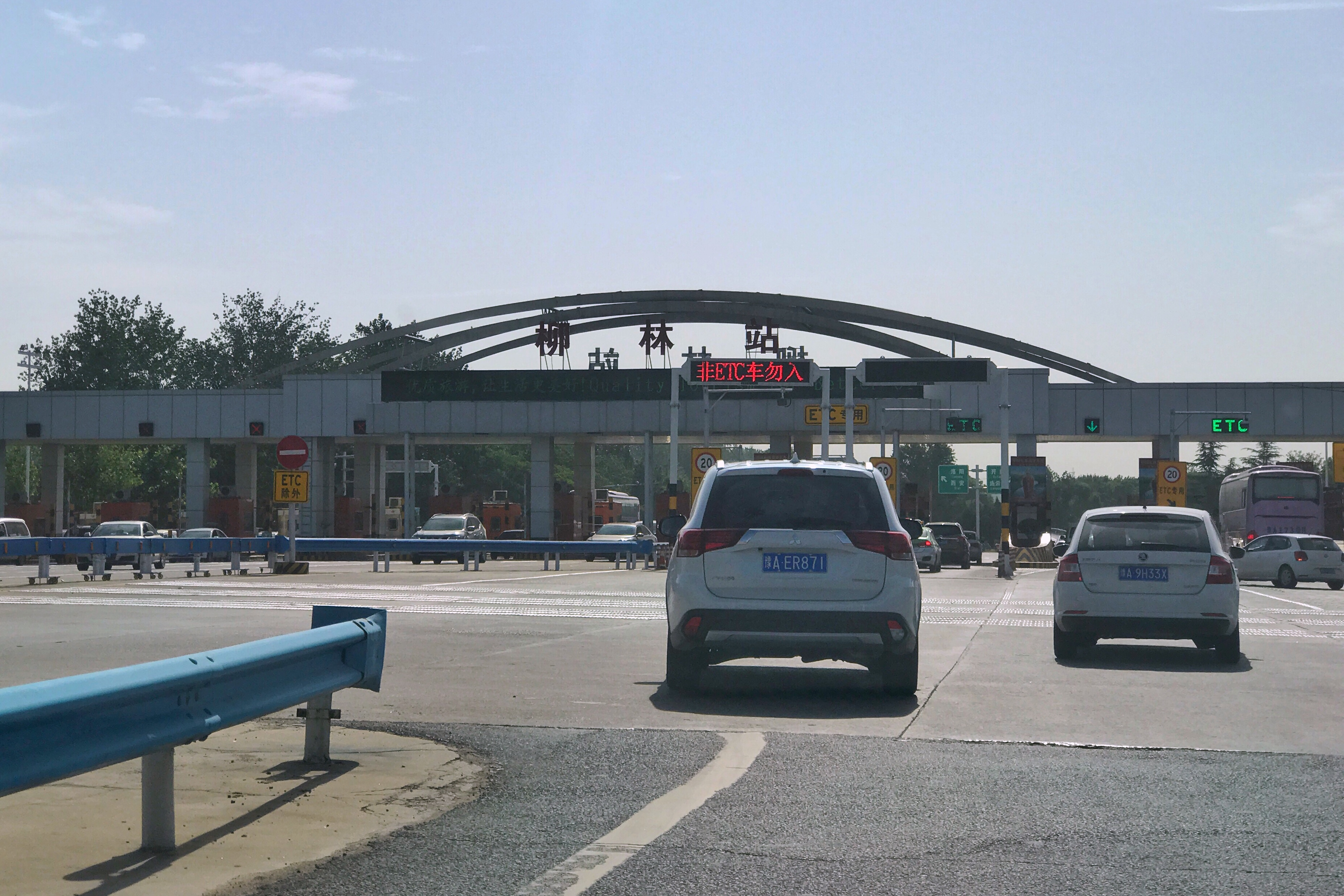
Liulin Toll Gate

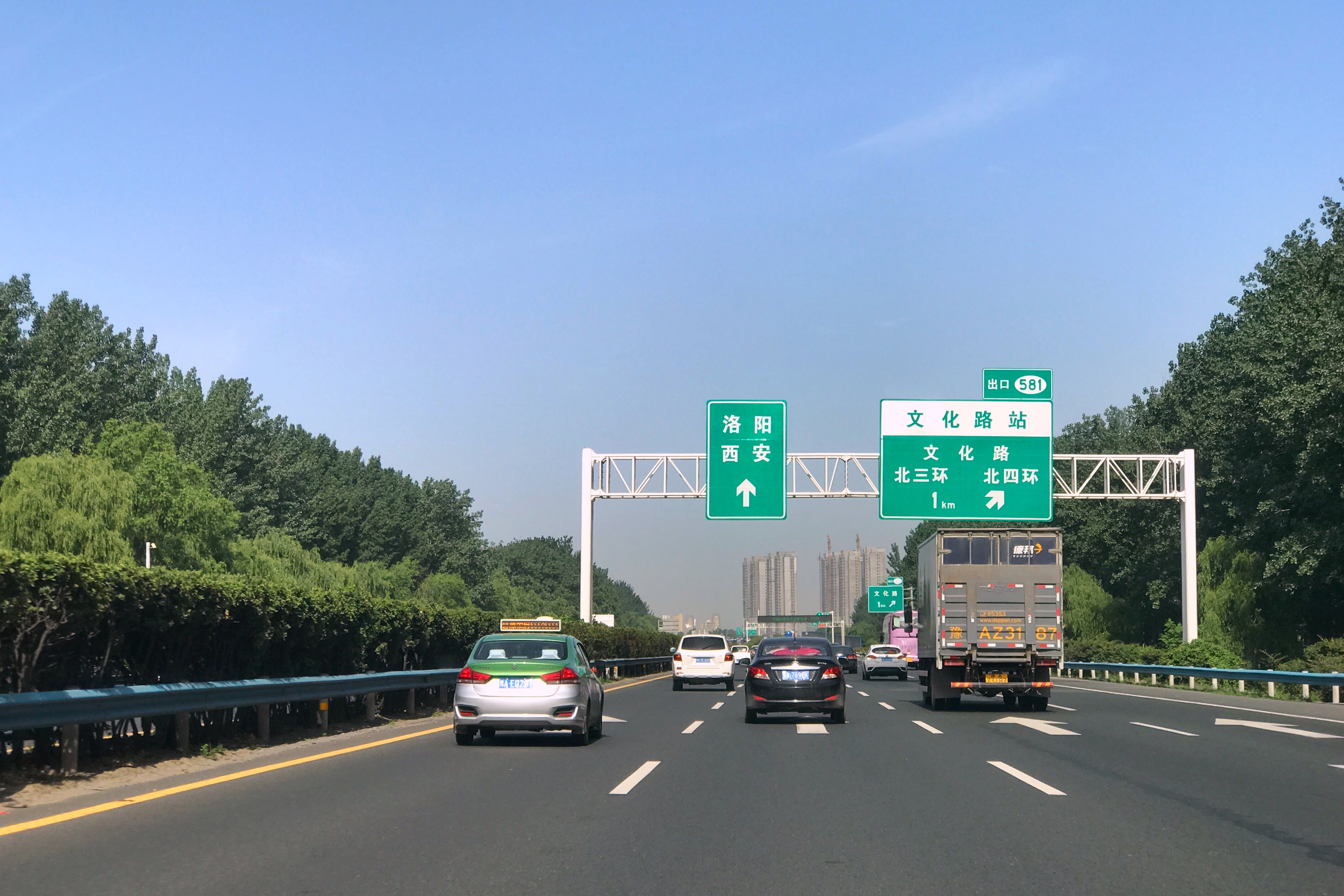
The north section of the expressway (G30 concurrency)

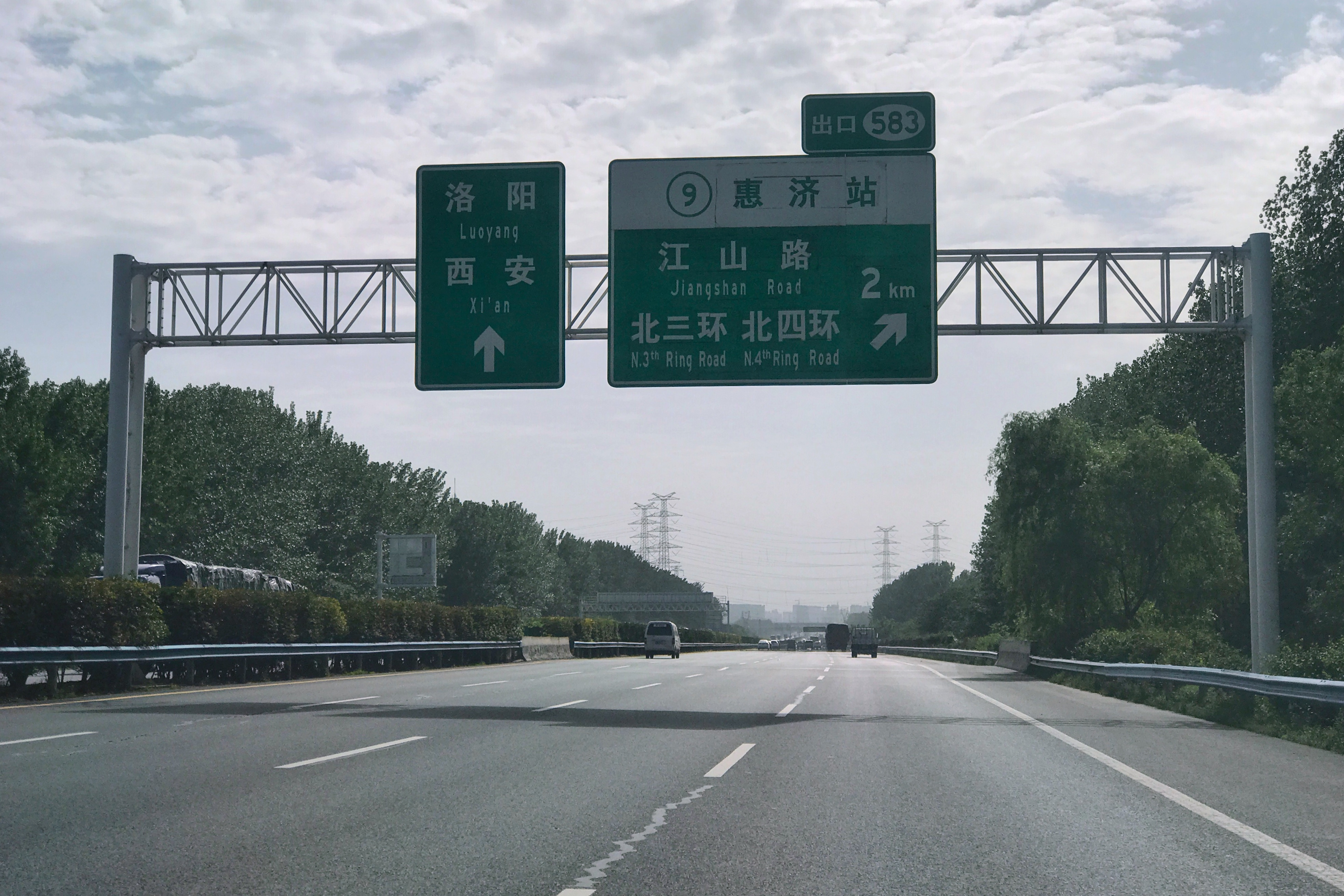
The expressway near Huiji exit

=== Speed Limit ===
The maximum speed limit is 120 km/h for light passenger vehicles and 90 km/h for heavy vehicles. The minimum speed limit is 60 km/h.

=== Tolls ===
The expressway is currently toll-free for light passenger vehicles registered in Zhengzhou (the initial characters on licence plates are 豫A).

Other vehicles using the expressway will be tolled.

=== Lanes ===
- 8 lanes (4 lanes for each direction) on north section and east section (G30 - Hanghai E. Road).
- 6 lanes (3 lanes for each direction) on other sections.

=== Traffic ===
Some exits in the north and east, such as Huiji, Wenhua Road, Liulin, Zhengzhou New Area, Putian, etc. are often congested during rush hours.

== Service Areas ==
- Zhengzhou North Service Area
- Zhengzhou East Service Area
- Zhengzhou West Service Area

== Connections ==
- G30 / Henan S87 at Guangwu Interchange
- G4 / G30 at Liujiang Interchange
- G4 / Henan S82 at Xiangyunsi Interchange
- Henan S1 at Zhengzhou South Interchange
- Henan S88 at Houzhai Interchange
- Henan S85 at Zhengzhou Southwest Interchange

== List of Exits ==
In counter-clockwise order from northwest direction:

Location	km	mi	Exit	Name	Destinations	Notes
G3001 (Zhengzhou Ring Expressway)
Xingyang				Guangwu Interchange	G30 / Henan S87 – Kaifeng, Luoyang, Yuntai Mountain	Continues north as S87 and west as G30
Xingyang				Kexue Ave.	Kexue Avenue – Xingyang, Zhengzhou High and New Technology Zone	
Xingyang	10.4	6.5		Yulong	G310 (Zhengshang Road) – Xingyang, Shangjie	
Xingyang			12	Zhongyuan W. Rd.	Zhongyuan W. Road – Xingyang	
Zhongyuan				Longhai W. Rd.	Longhai W. Road and Longhai Expressway – Xingyang	
Xingyang	Zhengzhou West Service Area					
Erqi				Zhengzhou Southwest Interchange	Henan S85 – Xinmi, Dengfeng	
Erqi	27	17		Yingtaogou	Henan S228 (Zhengmi Highway) – Xinmi, Dengfeng	
Erqi				Houzhai Interchange	Henan S88 – Yaoshan	
Xinzheng				Daxue S. Rd.	Henan S227 (Daxue S. Road) – Quliang	
Guancheng	38	24		Shabalihe	Henan S103 – Longhu; Jingguang Expressway	
Xinzheng				Xuanyuanguli	Henan S102 (Zhengxin Highway) – Longhu, Xinzheng	
Guancheng				East 3rd Ring Rd. (S)	East 3rd Ring Road (southern extension)	
Zhongmu				Zhengzhou South Interchange	Henan S1 – Zhengzhou Xinzheng International Airport	
Zhongmu			677	Xiangyunsi Interchange	G4 / Henan S82 – Xinxiang, Kaifeng	Southern terminus of G4 concurrency; G4 exit number
Guancheng			671	South 3rd Ring Rd.	South 3rd Ring Road (eastern extension); Xin'an Road – Zhongmu	G4 exit number
Guancheng			669	Hanghai E. Rd.	Hanghai E. Road	G4 exit number
Guancheng			666	Putian	Shangdu Road; Longhai Expressway; East 4th Ring Road	G4 exit number
Jinshui			662	Zhengzhou New Area	Jinshui E. Road – Zhengdong New Area CBD, Zhengzhou East railway station Zhengkai Avenue – Kaifeng	G4 exit number
Jinshui	Zhengzhou East Service Area					
Jinshui				North 3rd Ring Rd. (E)	North 3rd Ring Road (eastern extension)	Under planning
Jinshui			657A-B (G4); 562A-B (G30)	Liujiang Interchange	G4 / G30 – Xinxiang, Kaifeng	Eastern terminus of G30 Concurrency; Northern terminus of G4 Concurrency; Continues east as G30 and north as G4
Jinshui			567	East 3rd Ring Rd. (N)	East 3rd Ring Road (northern extension) – Xinxiang, Pingyuan New Area	G30 exit number
Jinshui			575	Liulin	Zhongzhou Avenue	G30 exit number
Jinshui			577	Huayuan Rd.	Huayuan N. Road	G30 exit number
Jinshui			581	Wenhua Rd.	Wenhua N. Road	G30 exit number
Huiji			583	Huiji	Jiangshan Road – Zhengzhou Yellow River Scenic Area; Jingguang Expressway; Tianhe Road	G30 exit number
Zhongyuan			585	West 3rd Ring Rd. (N)	West 3rd Ring Road (northern extension)	G30 exit number
Zhongyuan	Zhengzhou North Service Area					
Zhongyuan			591	Gouzhao	West 4th Ring Road	G30 exit number
Xingyang			596	Guangwu Interchange	G30 / Henan S87 – Kaifeng, Luoyang, Yuntai Mountain	Western terminus of G30 Concurrency; continues north as S87 and west as G30; G30 exit number
Closed/former; Concurrency terminus; HOV only; Incomplete access; Tolled; Route transition; Unopened
