= Shangjie railway station =

Railway station in Zhengzhou, China

Shangjie 上街

General information
- Location: Shangjie District, Zhengzhou, Henan; China
- Coordinates: 34.8261°N 113.2717°E
- Operator: CR Zhengzhou
- Line: Longhai Railway

Other information
- Station code: 39086 (TMIS code)
- Classification: Class 3 station (三等站)

History
- Opened: 1958
Location
- Location within Zhengzhou Location within Henan Location within China

Shangjie railway station (Chinese: 上街站) is a railway station of Longhai railway located in Shangjie District, Zhengzhou, Henan, China.

The station is currently out of passenger services.

== History ==
The station was opened in 1909.
