= Jingguang Expressway =

Road in Zhengzhou, Henan, China

- 京广快速路
- Jingsha Expressway 京沙快速路
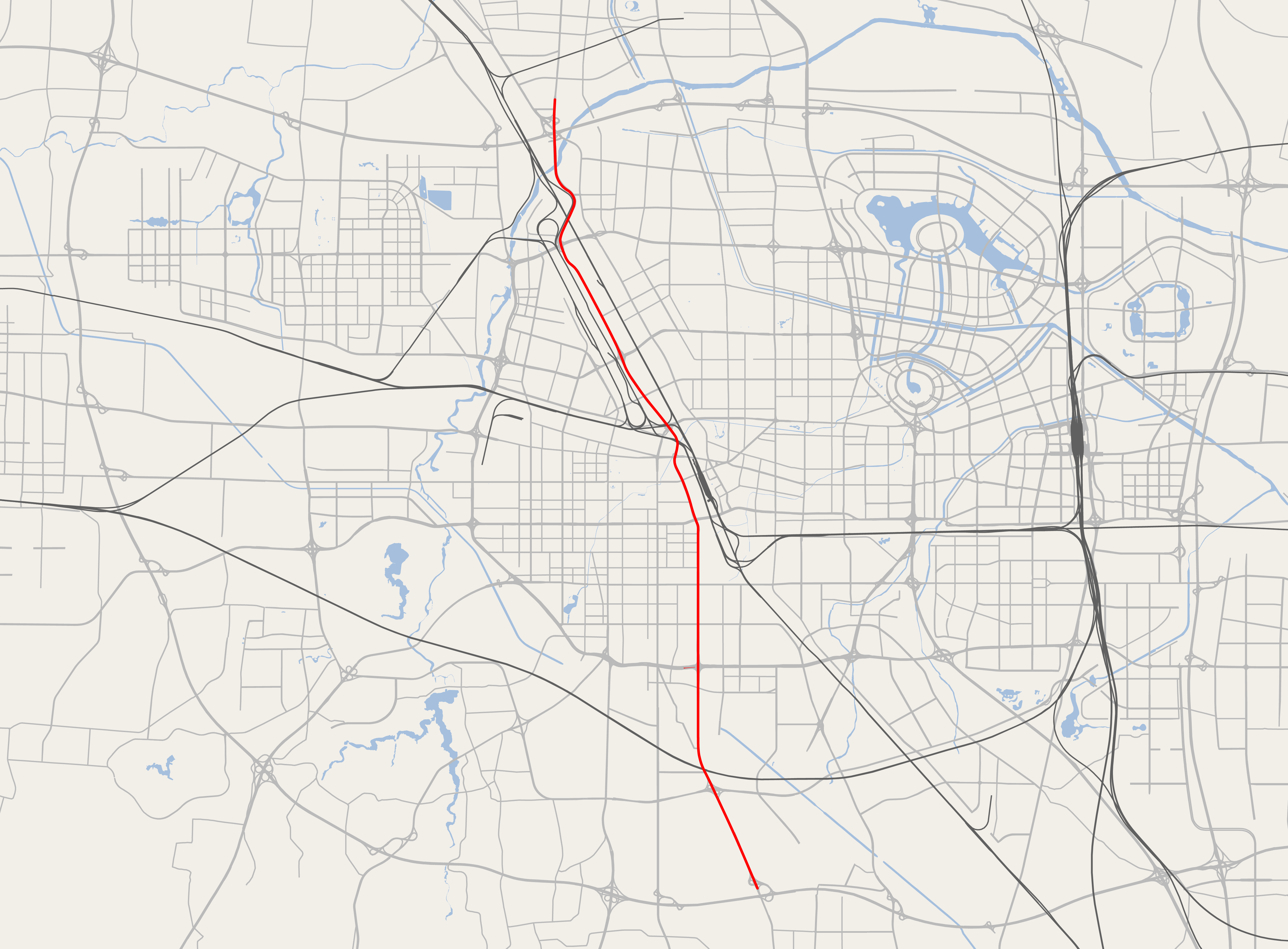

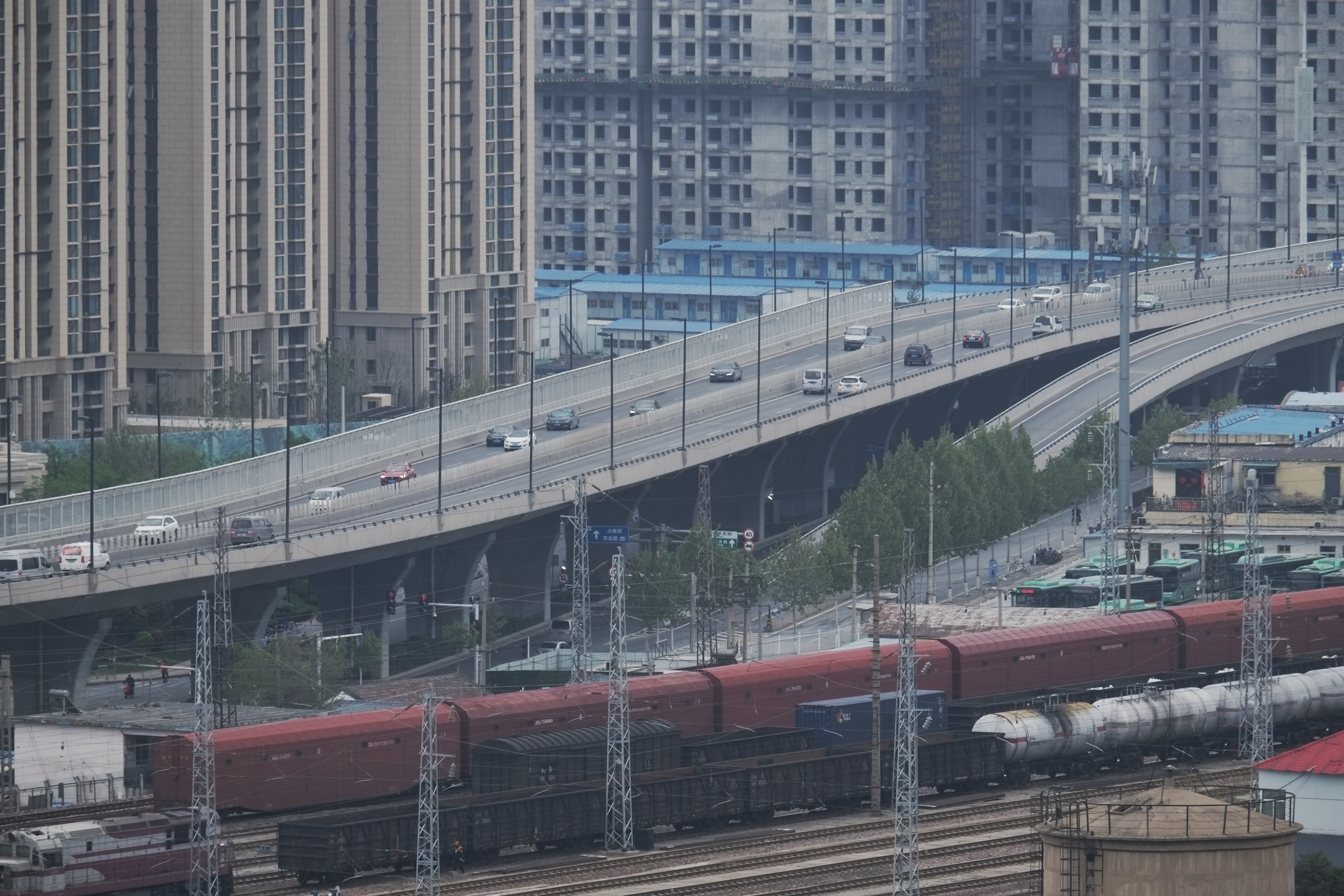
- Jingguang Expressway near Zhengzhou North railway station

Route information
- Length: 25.2 km (15.7 mi)
- Existed: 2012–present

Major junctions
- North end: G30 and Tianhe Road in Huiji District, Zhengzhou, Henan
- North 3rd Ring Road; Nongye Expressway; Longhai Expressway; South 3rd Ring Road; South 4th Ring Road
- South end: G3001 in Guancheng Hui District, Zhengzhou, Henan

Location
- Country: China

Highway system
- Transport in China

The Jingguang Expressway (Chinese: 京广快速路) is a 25.2-kilometre (15.7 mi) long urban express road in Zhengzhou, Henan, China.

== History ==
The expressway was constructed in two phases.

The first phase, which is from North 3rd Ring Road to South 3rd Ring Road, was opened on 28 April 2012. The northern section (North 3rd Ring Road–Zhongyuan Road) is an elevated expressway built above Shakou Road while the southern section (Zhongyuan Road–South 3rd Ring Road) is mainly tunneled beneath Jingguang Road.

The second phase was finished in 2016. It is in elevated form and extends the expressway to Tianhe Road and G30 Lianhuo Expressway to the north and Zhengzhou Ring Expressway to the south.

== Road conditions ==
=== Speed limit ===
The max speed limit is 60 km/h for the section between North 3rd Ring Road and South 3rd Ring Road, and 80 km/h for other sections.

=== Toll ===
This express road is toll-free.

=== Lanes ===
Main road:

- 5 lanes (2 lanes for southbound and 3 lanes for northbound) on the section between North 3rd Ring Road and Zhongyuan Road.
- 6 lanes (3 lanes for each direction) on other sections.

== Exit list ==
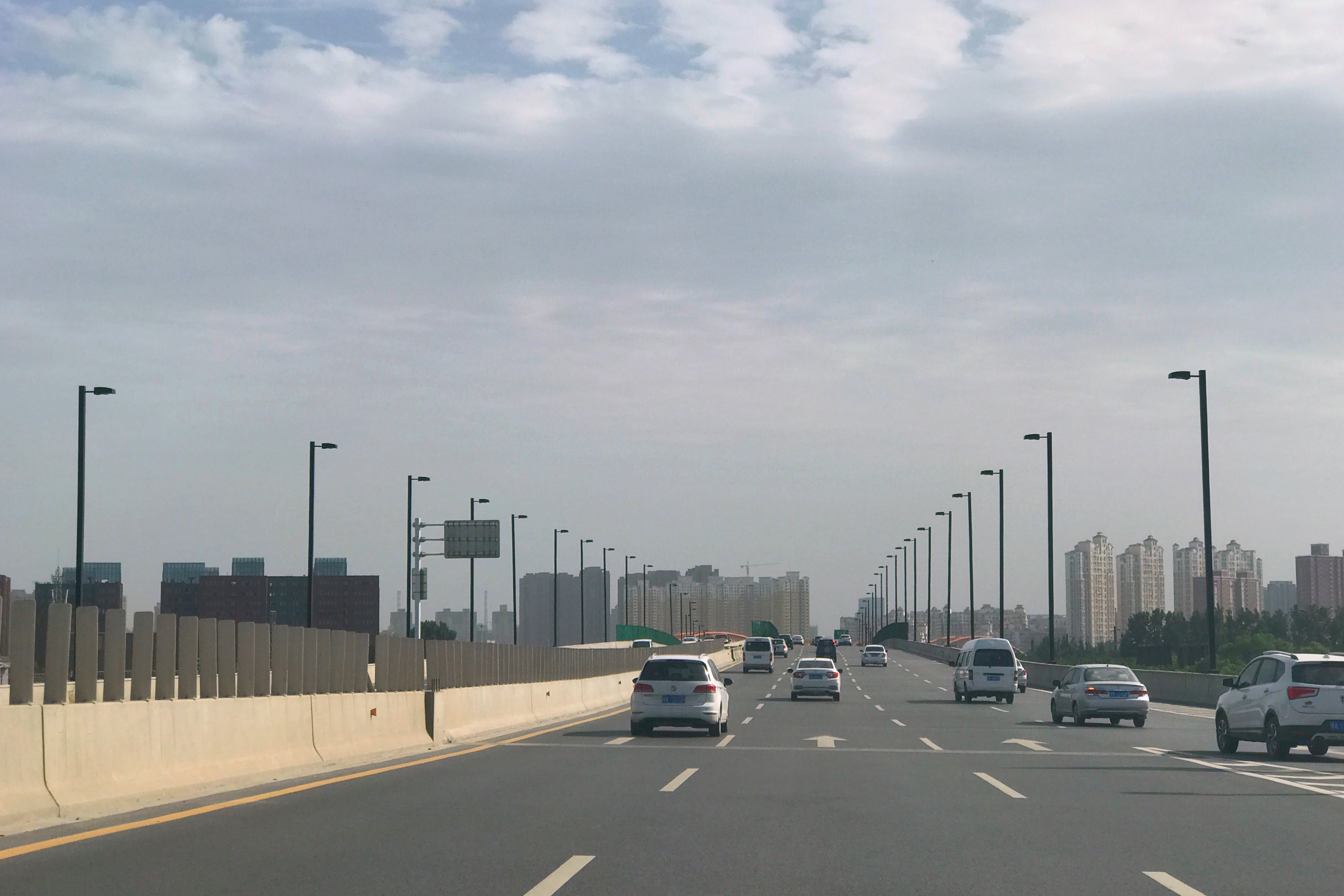
Jingguang Expwy northern section

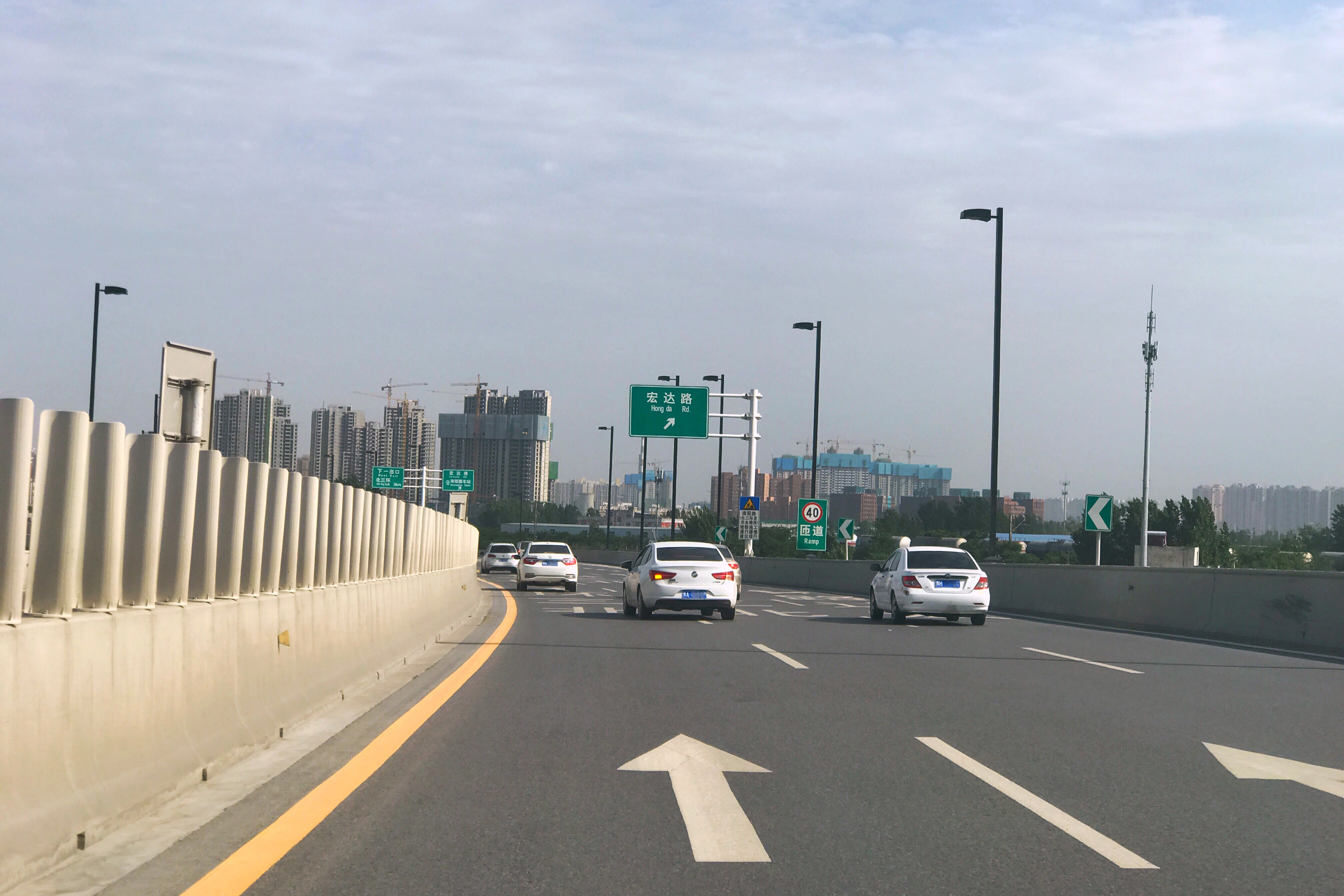
Jingguang Expwy northern section

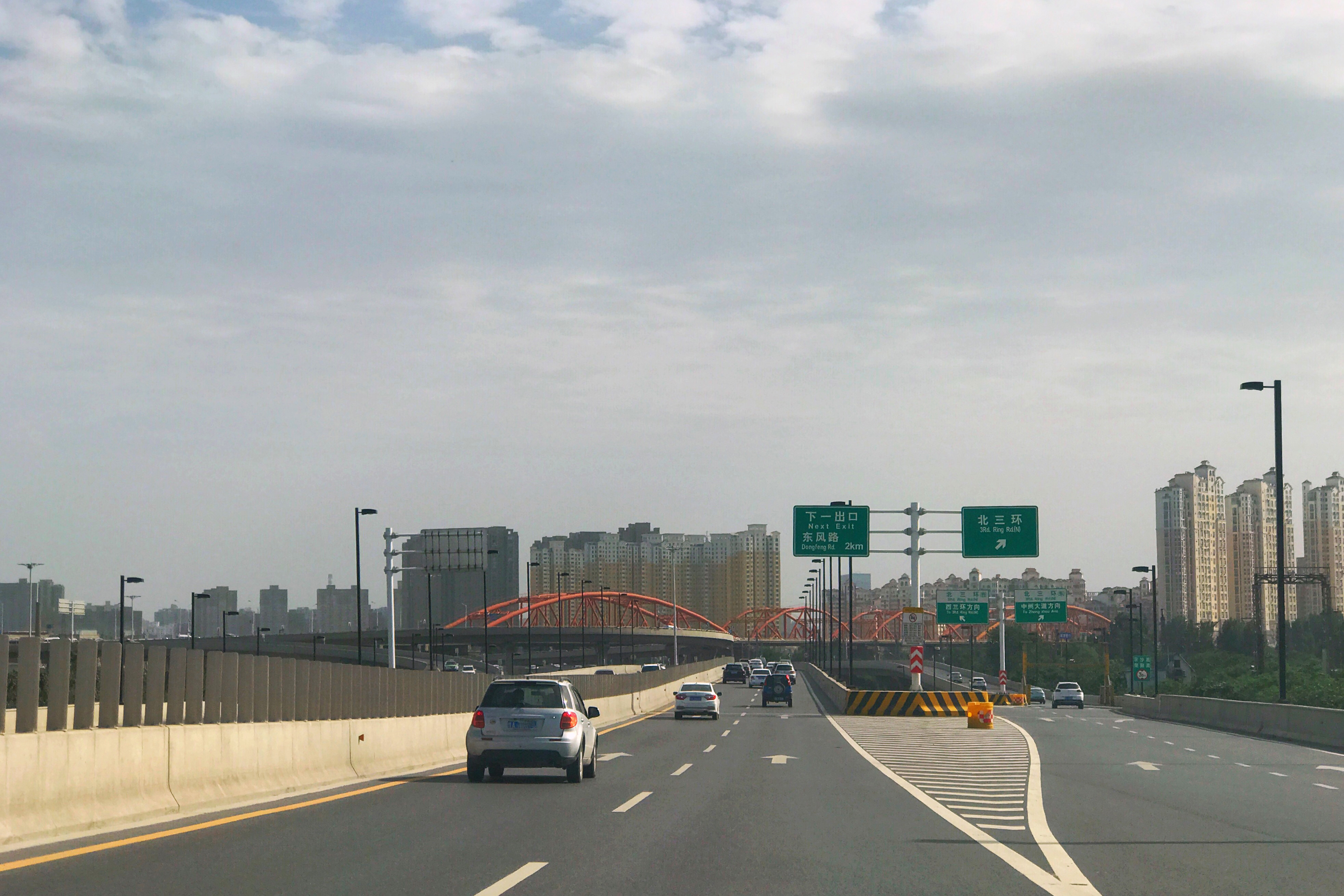
Jingguang Expwy near N. 3rd Ring Road

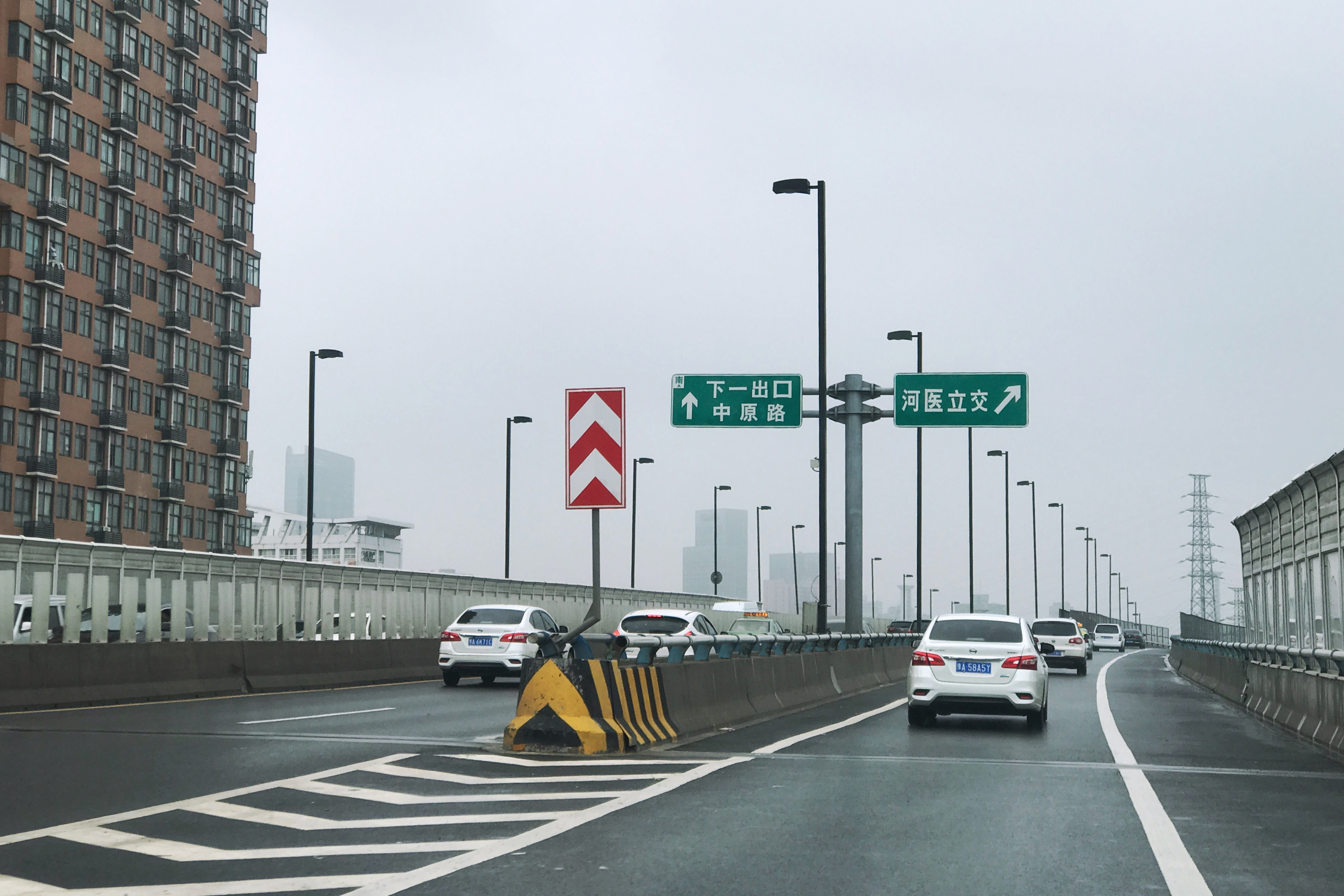
Heyi Interchange exit of Jingguang Expwy

From north to south:

Location	km	mi	Exit	Name	Destinations	Notes
Jingguang Expressway
Continues north as Tianhe Road
Huiji District	0	0	0	Tianhe Rd.	Tianhe Road	
Huiji District				Lianhuo Expwy	G30 – Kaifeng, Luoyang, other destinations in Zhengzhou	
Huiji District				Xinlong Rd.	Xinlong Road	Southbound entrance and northbound exit only
Huiji District				Hongda Rd.	Hongda Road	
Huiji District				3rd Ring Rd. (N)	North 3rd Ring Road	No northbound or southbound entrances from eastbound N. 3rd Ring Road
Jinshui District				Xinglongpu Rd.	Xinglongpu Road	Southbound entrance and northbound exit only
Jinshui District				Dongfeng Rd.	Dongfeng Road	
Jinshui District				Nongye Expwy	Nongye Expressway	
Jinshui District				Huanghe Rd.	Huanghe Road; Nongye Road	
Jinshui District				Heyi Interchange	Jinshui Road; Heyi Interchange	Northbound entrance, southbound entrance and exit
Erqi District				Erqi Square	Jiefang Road – Erqi Square; Jianshe E. Road	Entrances and northbound exit only
Erqi District				Zhongyuan Rd.	Zhongyuan Road; Jingguang Road (ground level) – Zhengzhou railway station (for southbound traffic)	
Erqi District				Longhai Rd.	Longhai Expressway; Longhai M. Road; Jingguang Road (ground level) – Zhengzhou railway station (for northbound traffic)	
Erqi District				Huaihe Rd.	Huaihe E. Road	
Erqi District				Hanghai Rd.	Hanghai M. Road; Changjiang M. Road	Northbound entrance and southbound exit only
Erqi District				Changjiang Rd.	Changjiang M. Road; Hanghai M. Road	Southbound entrance and northbound exit only
Erqi District				3rd Ring Rd. (S)	South 3rd Ring Road	
Erqi District				Lijiang Rd.	Lijiang Road	Southbound entrance and northbound exit only
Erqi District				Jiazhai Rd.	Jiazhai Road; Zhengping Road	Northbound entrance and southbound exit only
Erqi District and Guancheng Hui District				4th Ring Rd. (S)	South 4th Ring Road	
Guancheng Hui District				Yuyi Rd.	Yuyi Road	
Guancheng Hui District				City Ring Expwy	G3001 – Shibalihe, Guancheng, Zhengzhou	Southern terminus; continues south as G107 (Longhu Avenue)
Continues south as G107 (Longhu Avenue)
Closed/former; Concurrency terminus; HOV only; Incomplete access; Tolled; Route transition; Unopened
