= 3rd Ring Road (Zhengzhou) =

Road in Zhengzhou, China

- 三环路
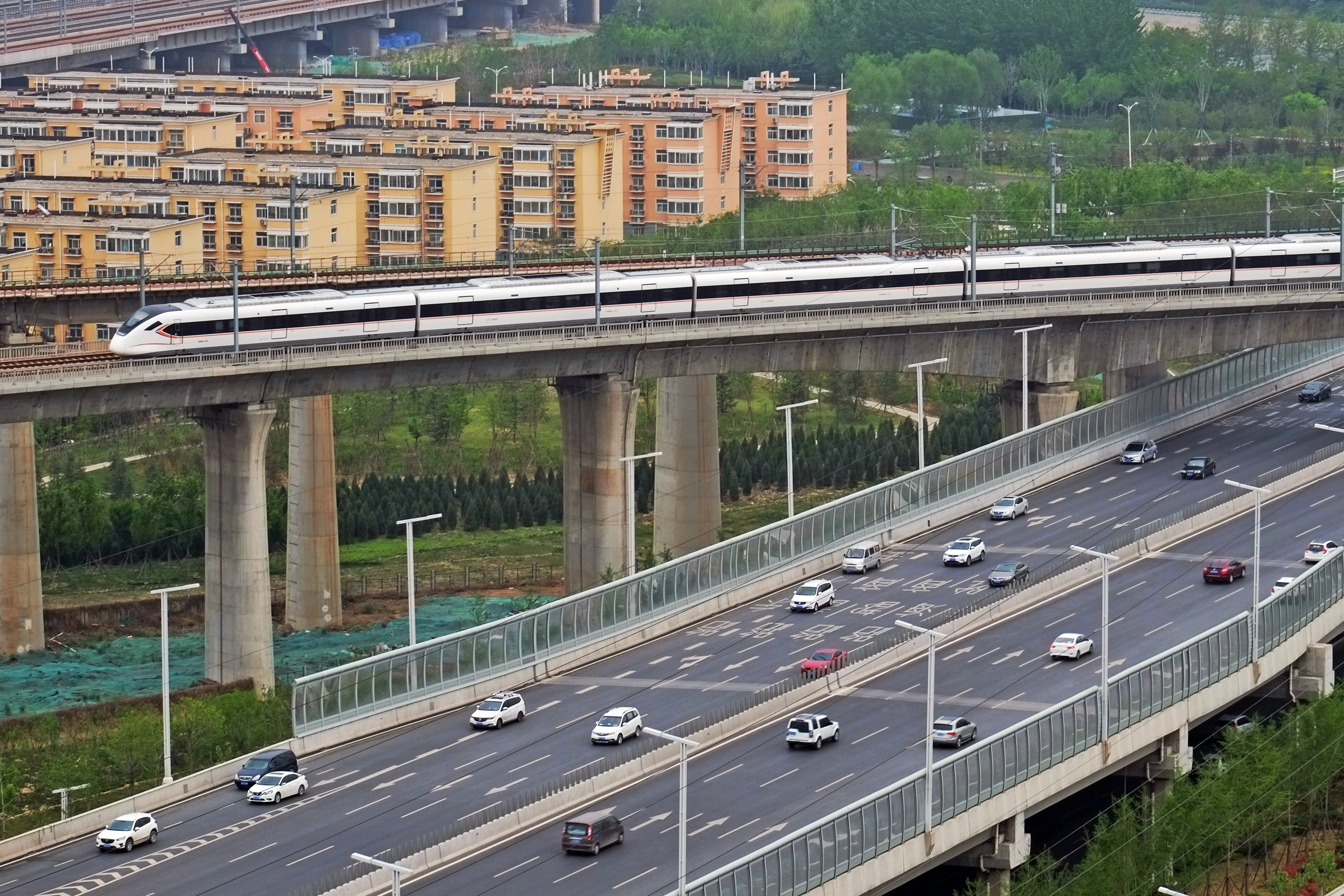
- East 3rd Ring Road and Zhengzhou-Kaifeng intercity railway

Major junctions
- Zhongzhou Avenue; Jingguang Expressway; Nongye Expressway; Longhai Expressway; Henan S85; Henan S1

Location
- Country: China
- Province: Henan

Highway system
- Transport in China

The 3rd Ring Road (Chinese: 三环路) is a controlled access urban express road in Zhengzhou, Henan, which runs around the city center.

== Route ==
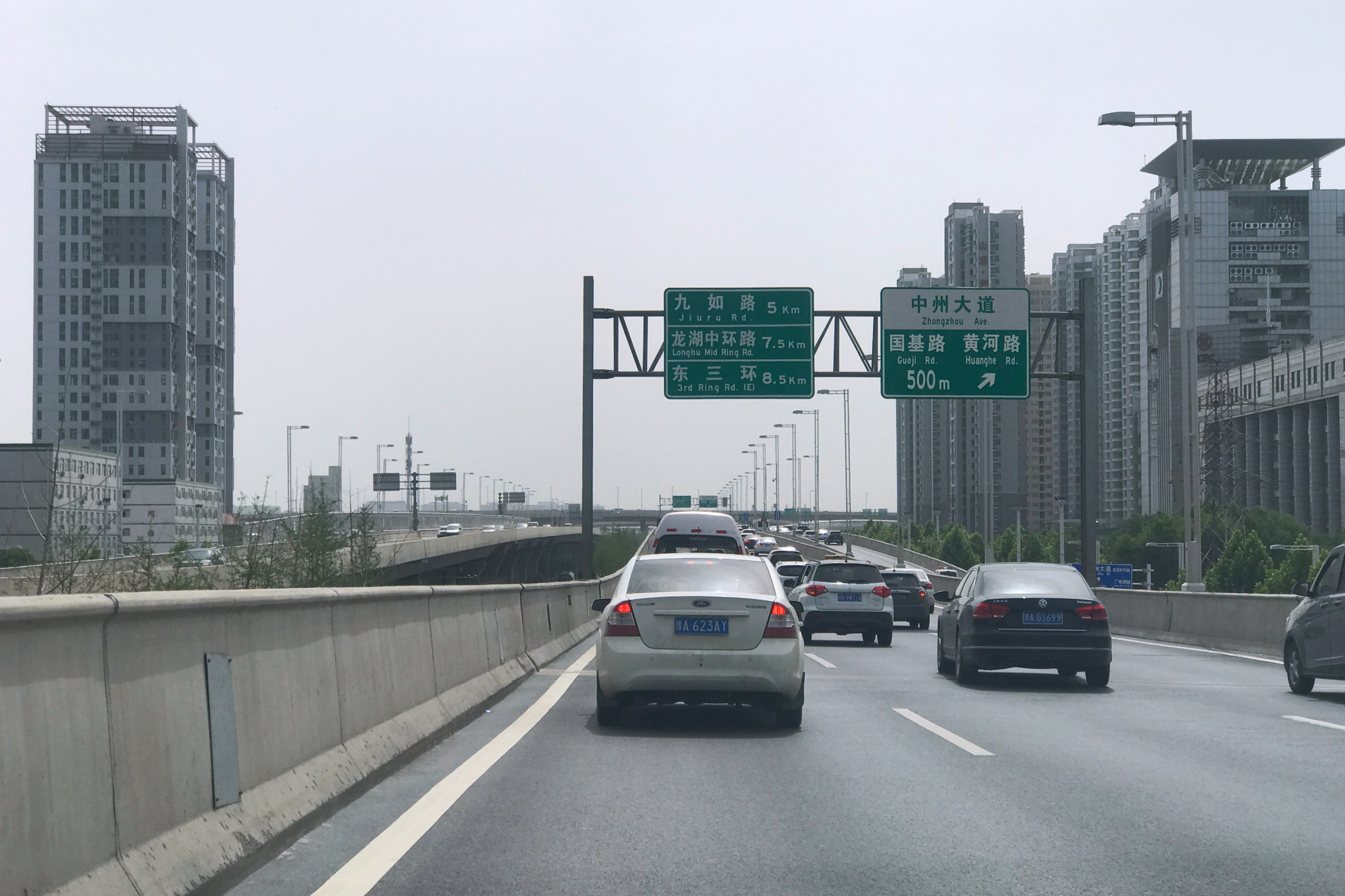
North 3rd Ring Road eastbound near Zhongzhou Avenue

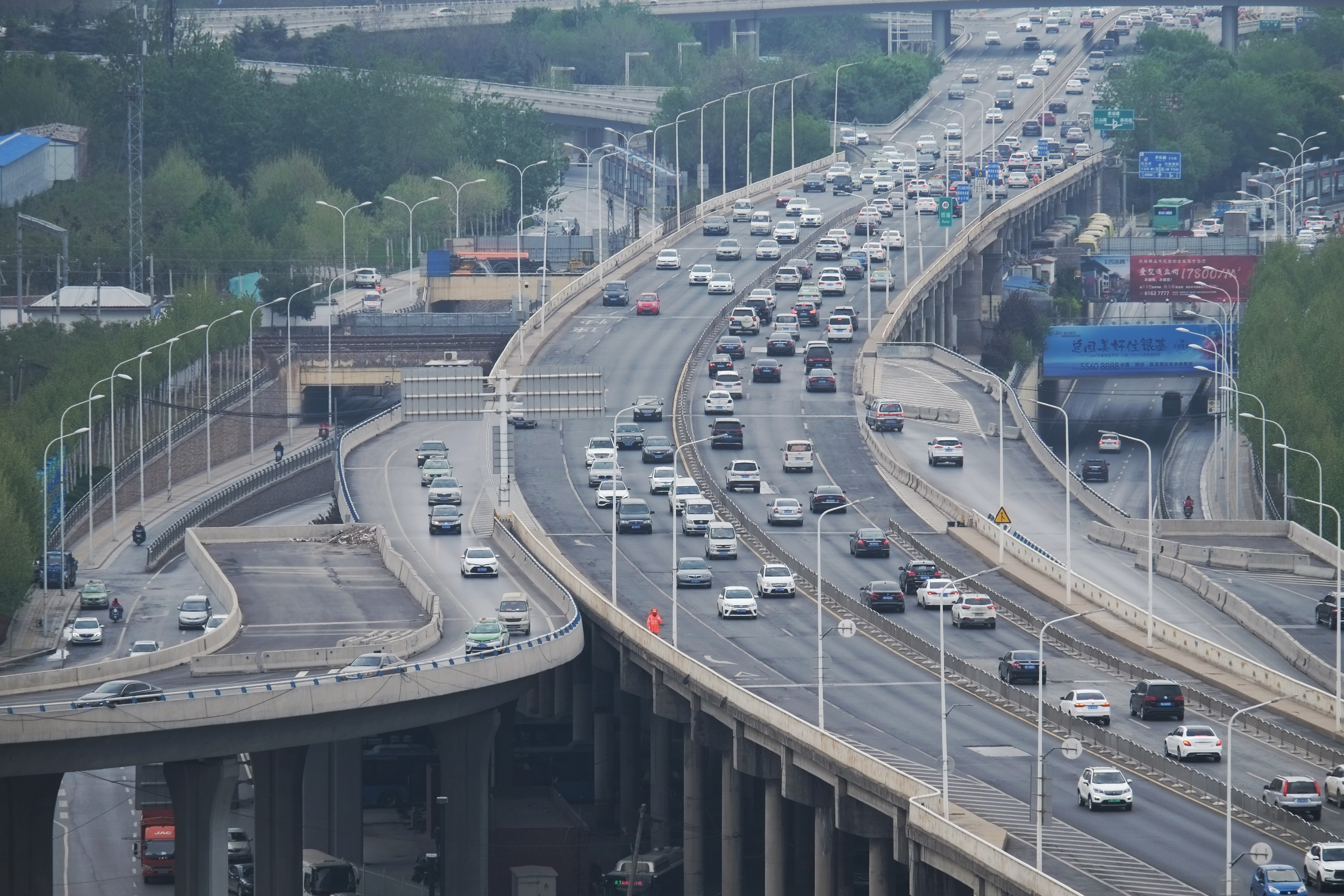
North 3rd Ring Road near Jingguang Expressway

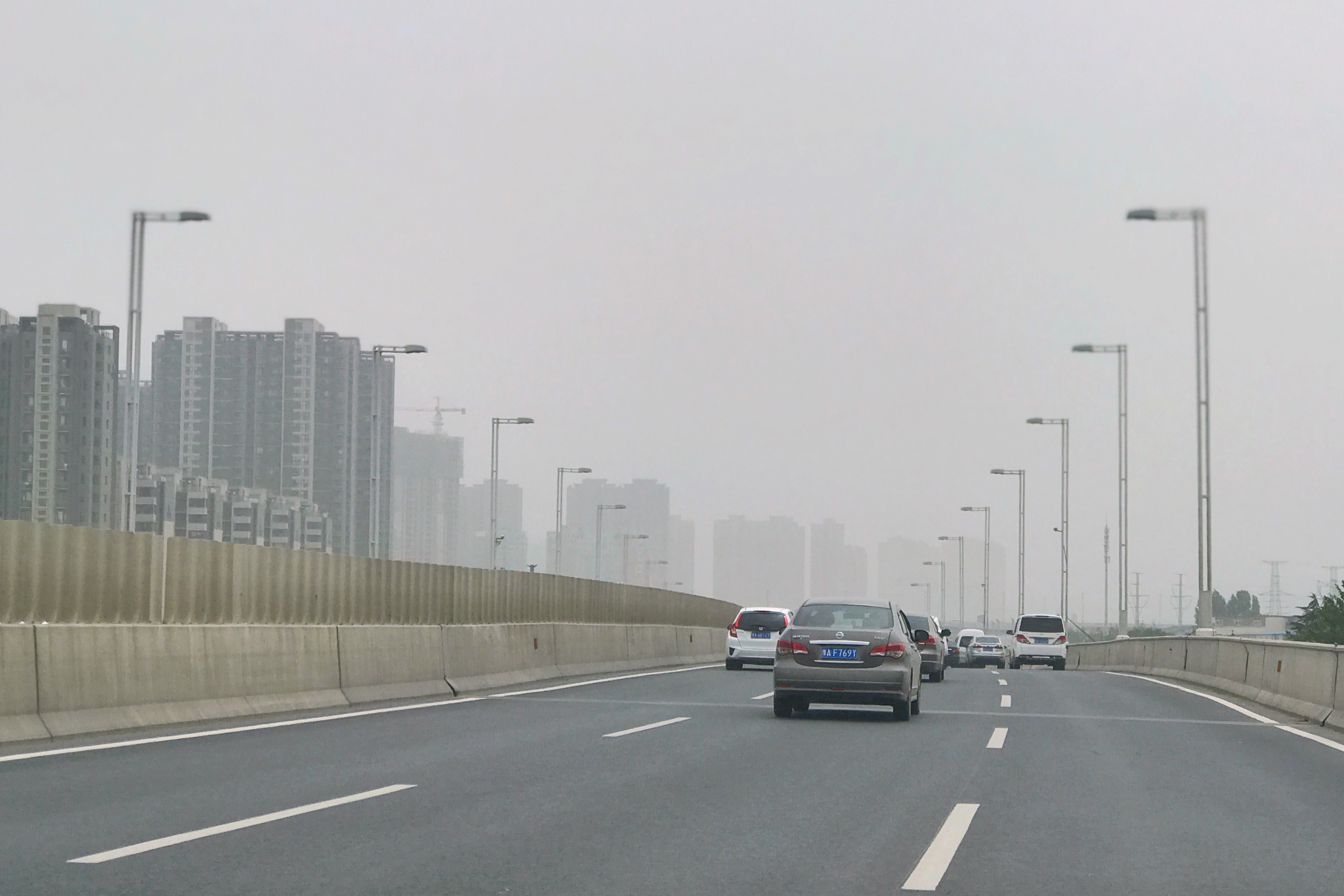
West 3rd Ring Road

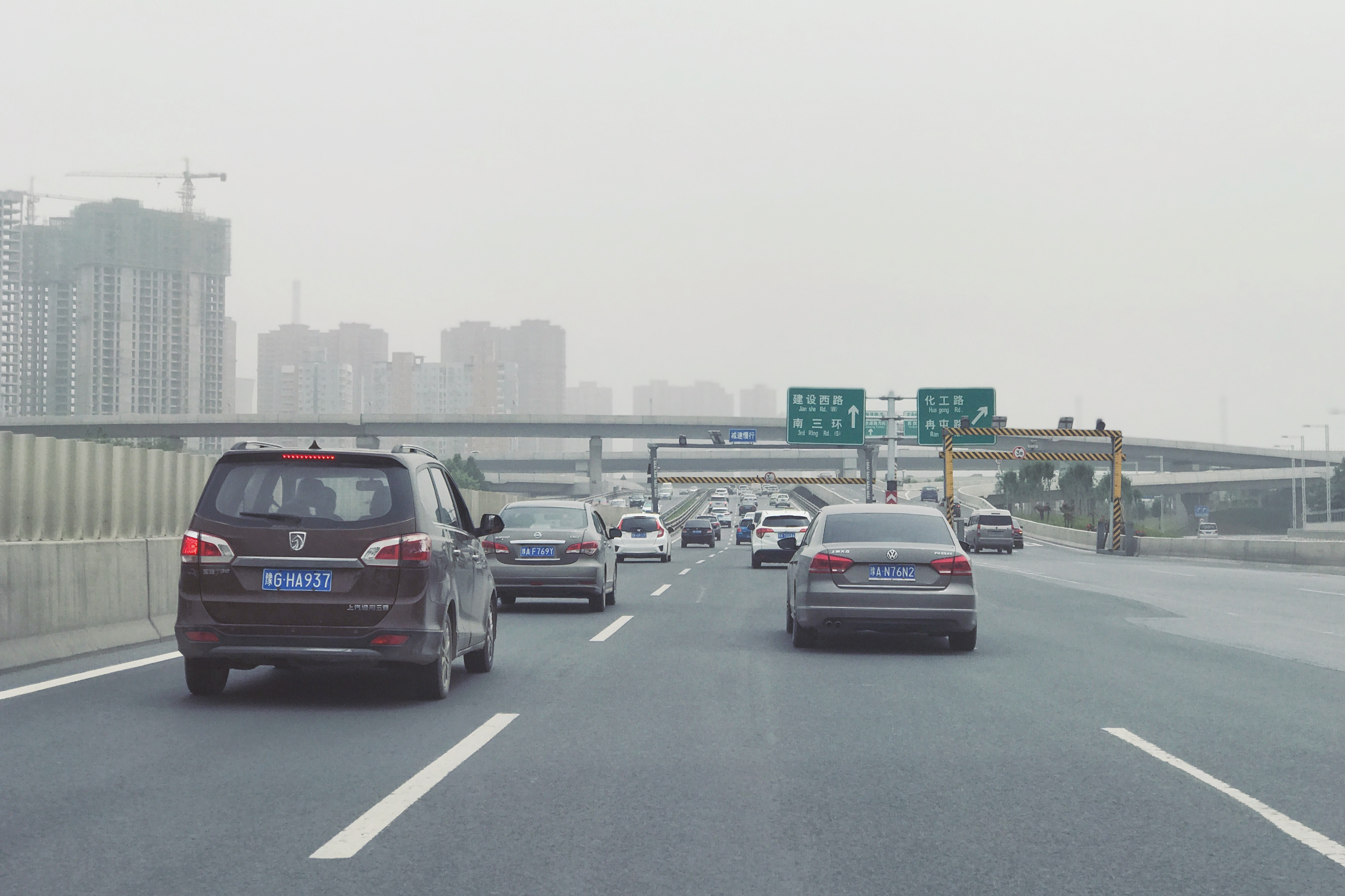
West 3rd Ring Road southbound near Nongye Expressway

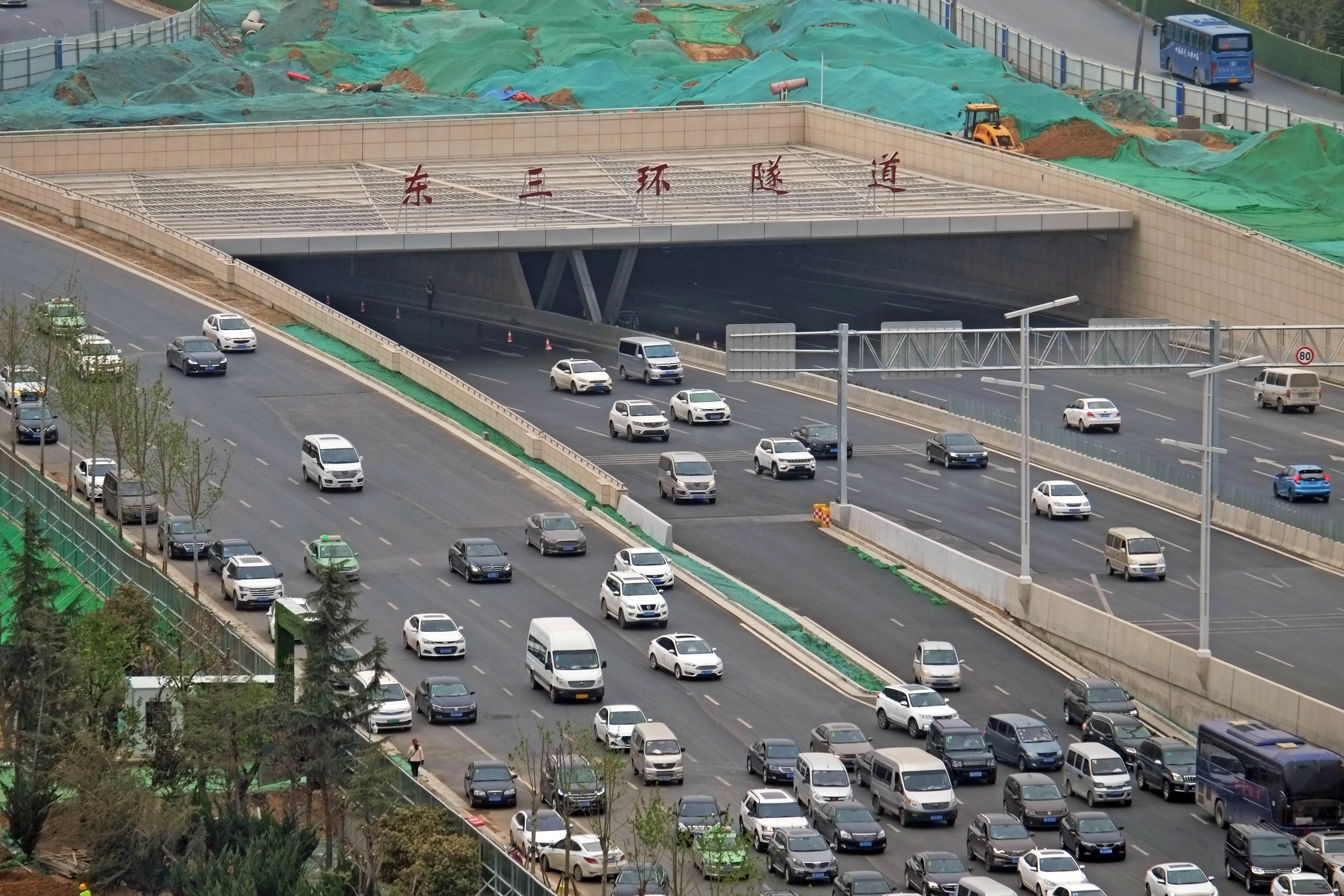
East 3rd Ring Road tunnel, the final section completed on Zhengzhou's 3rd Ring Road

The 3rd Ring Road runs around Zhengzhou city center in a roughly rectangular shape.

- North 3rd Ring Road: All elevated except the tunnel beneath the Longhu area. All complete.
- West 3rd Ring Road: Partly elevated and partly on-level. All complete.
- South 3rd Ring Road: Partly elevated and partly on-level. All complete.
- East 3rd Ring Road: All elevated except the tunnel beneath Zhengzhou East railway station east plaza. All complete.

== Road conditions ==
=== Speed limit ===
The max speed limit is 60 km/h for the tunnel section on the North 3rd Ring Road and 80 km/h for other sections.

=== Toll ===
This express road is toll-free.

=== Lanes ===
Main road:

- 8 lanes (4 lanes for each direction) on East 3rd Ring Road.
- 4 lanes (2 lanes for each direction) on the bridge across Zhengzhou North railway station (Beihuan Bridge) on North 3rd Ring Road. (planned to be renovated and widened into 6 lanes)
- 6 lanes (3 lanes for each direction) on other sections.

== List of exits ==
In counter-clockwise from northeast:

| Location | km | mi | Exit | Name | Destinations | Notes |
North 3rd Ring Road (east-west)
| Jinshui District | | | | East 3rd Ring Rd. | East 3rd Ring Road | |
| Jinshui District | | | | Longhu Outer Ring Road | | |
| Jinshui District | | | | Longhu Middle Ring Road | | |
| Jinshui District | | | | Longhu Inner Ring Road; Chaoyang Road | | Westbound exit and eastbound entrance |
| Jinshui District | | | | Jiuru Rd. | Jiuru Road | Westbound entrance and eastbound exit |
| Jinshui District | | | | Zhongyi Rd. | Zhongyi W. Road; Zhongyi Road | Eastbound exit only |
| Jinshui District | | | | Longhu Middle Ring Road | | |
| Jinshui District | | | | Zhongzhou Ave. | Zhongzhou Avenue | |
| Jinshui District | | | | Huayuan Rd. | Huayuan Road | |
| Jinshui District | | | | Wenhua Rd. | Wenhua Road | |
| Jinshui District | | | | Suoling Rd. | Suoling Road; Fengqing Road | Eastbound entrance is near Fengqing Road |
| Huiji District | | | | Nanyang Road Interchange | Jiangshan Road; Nanyang Road | |
| Huiji District | | | | Jingguang Expwy | Jingguang Expressway | Westbound exit and eastbound entrance |
| Huiji District | | | | Dianchang Rd. | Dianchang Road | Westbound entrance and eastbound exit |
| Huiji District | | | | Kexue Ave. | Kexue Avenue – Zhengzhou High and New Technology Zone; West 3rd Ring Road (northern extension) | Westbound exit and eastbound entrance |
West 3rd Ring Road (north-south)
| Zhongyuan District | | | | Kexue Ave. | Kexue Avenue – Zhengzhou High and New Technology Zone; West 3rd Ring Road (northern extension) | Northbound exit and southbound entrance |
| Zhongyuan District | | | | Dianchang S. Rd. | Dianchang S. Road | Northbound entrance and exit |
| Zhongyuan District | | | | Wulongkou S. Rd. | Wulongkou S. Road | |
| Zhongyuan District | | | | Nongye Expwy | Nongye Expressway | |
| Zhongyuan District | | | | Jianshe W. Rd. | Jianshe W. Road – Xingyang, Shangjie | |
| Zhongyuan District | | | | Zhongyuan W. Rd. | Zhongyuan W. Road | |
| Zhongyuan District | | | | Longhai Rd. | Longhai Expressway | |
| Zhongyuan District | | | | Huaihe Rd. | Huaihe W. Road | Southbound exit and northbound entrance |
| Zhongyuan District | | | | Zhengshao Expwy | Henan S85 – Xinmi, Dengfeng, Shaolin Monastery; Hanghai W. Road | |
| Zhongyuan District | | | | Changjiang Rd. | Changjiang W. Road | |
South 3rd Ring Road (west-east)
| Erqi District | | | | Changjiang W. Road; Qifu Avenue; Danqing Road | | |
| Erqi District | | | | Gongren Rd. | Gongren Road | Westbound exit and entrance only |
| Erqi District | | | | Songshan S. Rd. | Songshan S. Rd. – Henan S88; Henan S316 (Zhengmi Road) – Xinmi, Dengfeng | |
| Erqi District | | | | Xinghua St. | Huainan Road; Xinghua S. Street | Westbound exit and entrance only |
| Erqi District | | | | Daxue S. Rd. | Daxue S. Road | |
| Erqi District | | | | Jingguang S. Rd. | Jingguang Expressway | |
| Erqi District | | | | Lianyun Rd. | Lianyun Road; Zijingshan S. Road | Eastbound exit and westbound entrance |
| Guancheng Hui District | | | | Zijingshan S. Rd. | Zijingshan S. Road; Lianyun Road | Westbound exit and eastbound entrance |
| Guancheng Hui District | | | | Zhongzhou Ave. | Zhongzhou Avenue | |
| Guancheng Hui District | | | | Airport Expwy | Henan S1 – Zhengzhou Xinzheng International Airport | No westbound exit to northbound S1 |
| Guancheng Hui District | | | | 5th Jingkai Ave. | 5th Jingkai Avenue | |
| Guancheng Hui District | | | | East 3rd Ring Rd. | East 3rd Ring Road | |
East 3rd Ring Road (south-north)
| Guancheng Hui District | | | | East 3rd Ring Rd. | East 3rd Ring Road | |
| Guancheng Hui District | | | | Hanghai E. Rd. | Hanghai E. Road – Zhengzhou Economic and Technological Development Zone | |
| Guancheng Hui District | | | | Longhai Expwy | Longhai Expressway | |
| Guancheng Hui District | | | | Shangding Rd. | Shangding Road; Zhengzhou East Railway Station | Northbound exit and sounthbound entrance |
| Jinshui District | | | | Jinshui E. Rd. | Jinshui E. Road | |
| Jinshui District | | | | Ping'an Ave. | Ping'an Avenue | Northbound exit and southbound entrance |
| Jinshui District | | | | North 3rd Ring Rd. | North 3rd Ring Road | |
Closed/former; Concurrency terminus; HOV only; Incomplete access; Tolled; Route transition; Unopened
