= Nongye Expressway =

Elevated express road in Zhengzhou, China

- 农业快速路
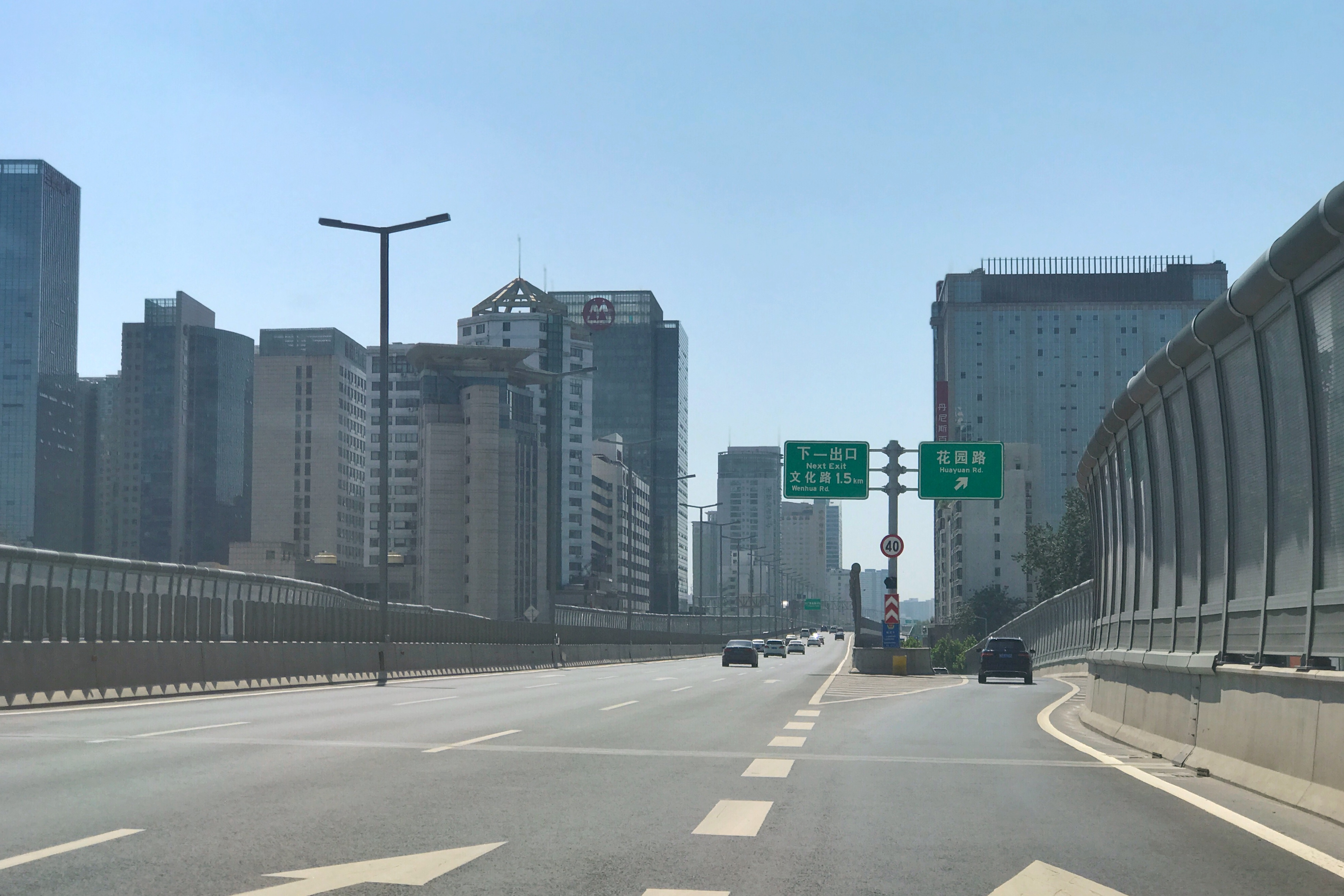
- The expressway near Huayuan Road exit

Route information
- Length: 12.9 km (8.0 mi)
- Existed: 2016–present

Major junctions
- East end: Zhongyi W. Road, Zhengdong New Area, Zhengzhou, Henan
- Zhongzhou Avenue; Jingguang Expressway; West 3rd Ring Road
- West end: Xiongying E. Road, Zhongyuan District, Zhengzhou, Henan

Location
- Country: China

Highway system
- Transport in China

The Nongye Expressway (Chinese: 农业快速路) is a 12.9-kilometre (8.0 mi) long elevated expressway in Zhengzhou, Henan, China.

== History ==
The construction of the expressway commenced on 1 March 2015. It is constructed in three phases: the east section (Zhongyi West Road–Nanyang Road) was opened on 26 January 2016. the west section (Tongbai N. Road–western terminus) was opened on 8 January 2017, and the section between Tongbai N. Road and Nanyang Road, which includes a bridge above Zhengzhou North railway station, was completed and opened for traffic on 31 March 2019.

== Route ==
The expressway starts at the crossing of Nongye E Road and Zhongyi W. Road in the east. It is then elevated above Nongye E. Road, Nongye Road, Rantun Road, and Huagong Road from east to west.

== Exit list ==
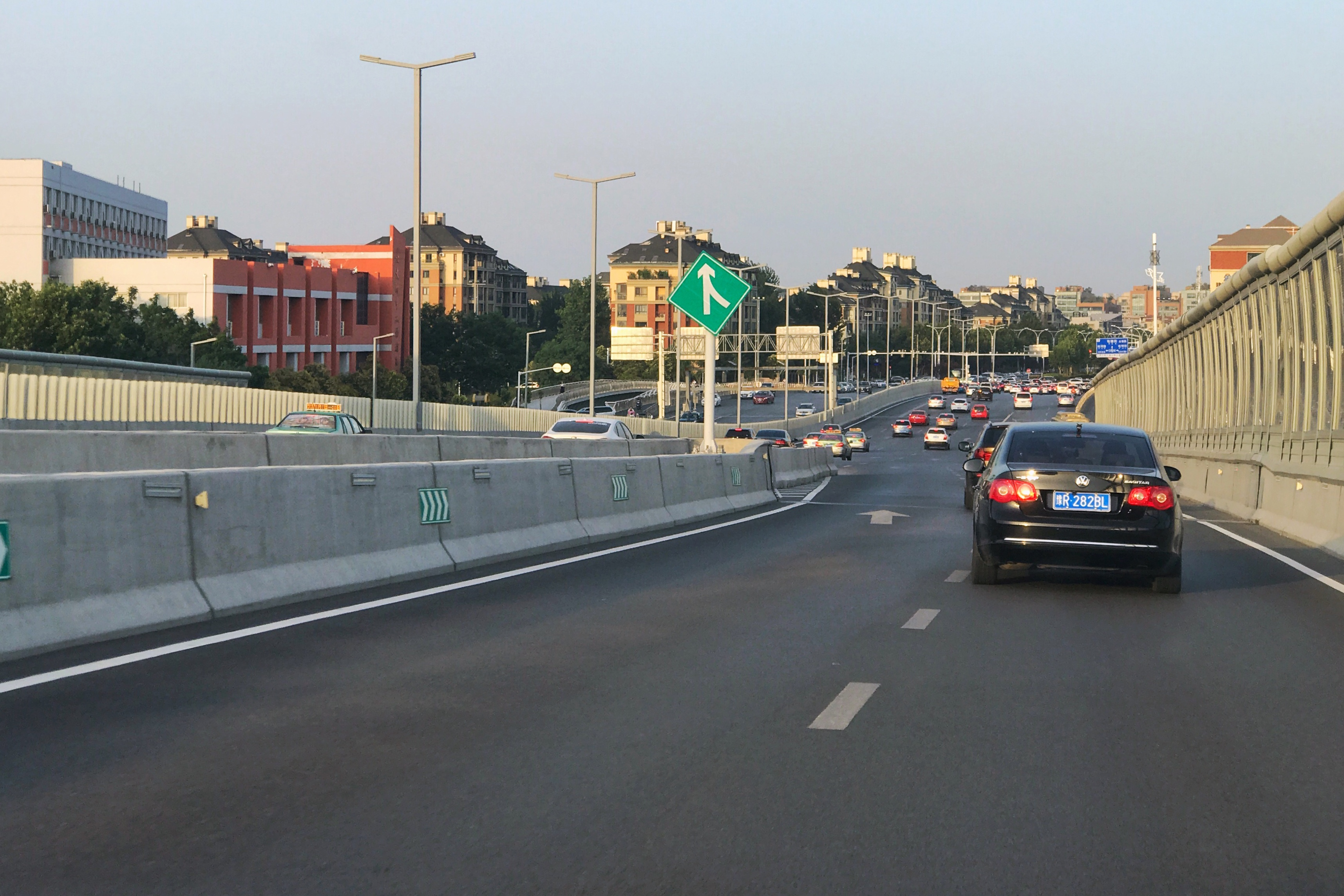
The expressway near its eastern terminus

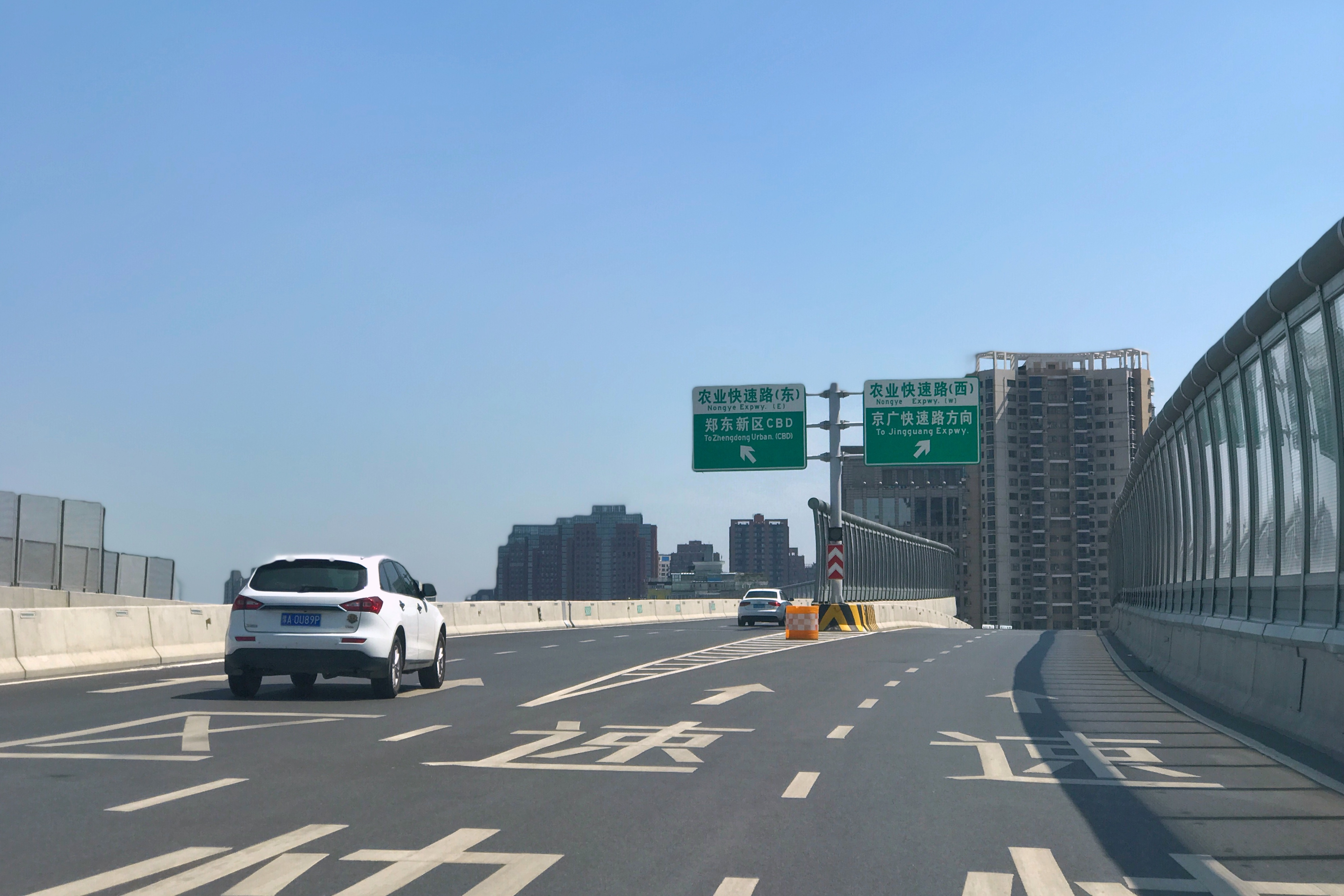
An entrance to the expressway

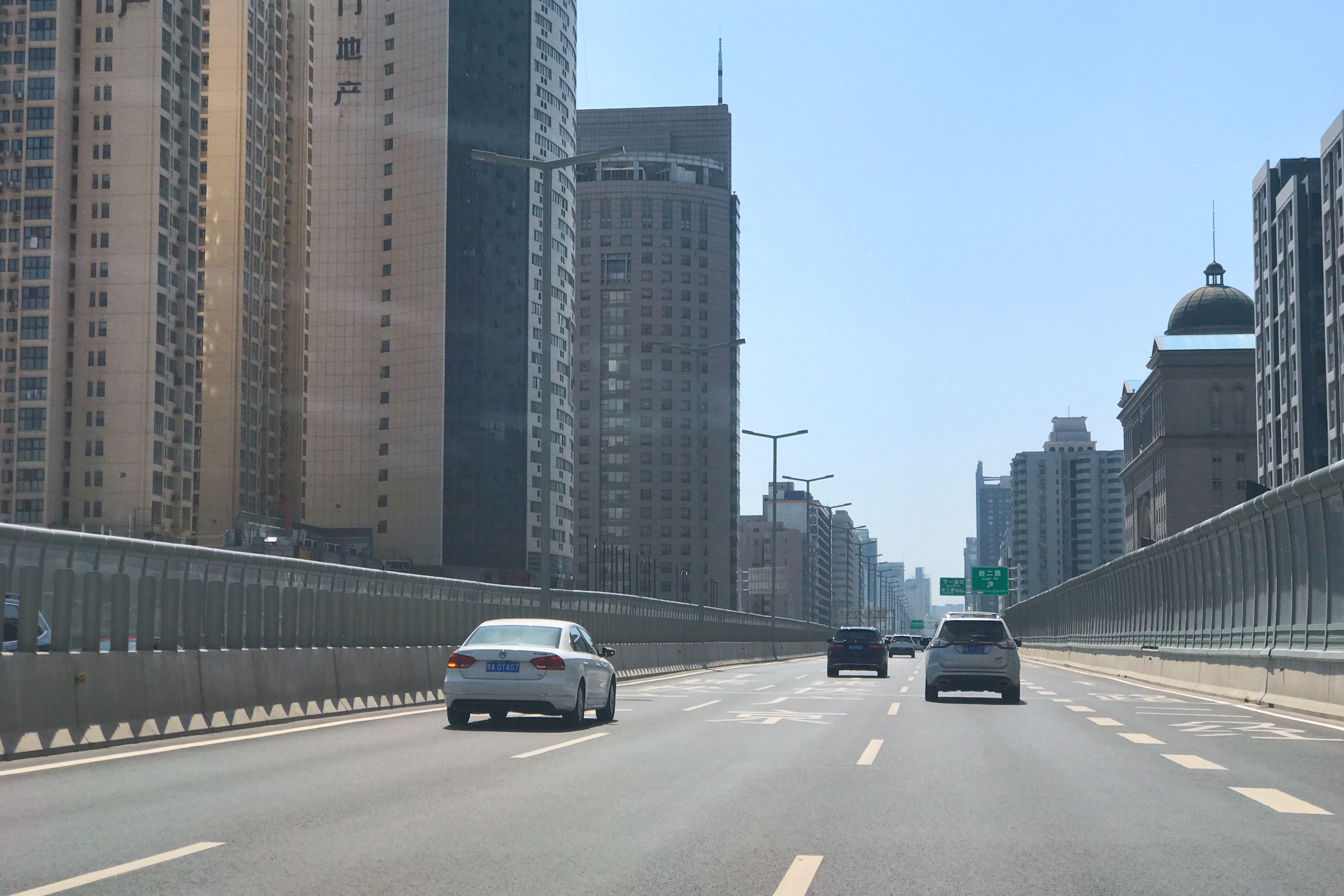
The expressway near Jing'er Road exit

From east to west:

Location	km	mi	Exit	Name	Destinations	Notes
Nongye Expressway
Continues east as Nongye E. Road
Jinshui District	0	0	0	Zhongyi W. Road	Zhongyi W. Road	Eastern terminus
Jinshui District				Zhongzhou Ave.	Zhongzhou Avenue	
Jinshui District				Dongming Rd.		Eastbound entrance only
Jinshui District				Jing'er Rd.	Jing'er Road	Westbound exit only, unopened
Jinshui District				Jingsan Rd.	Jingsan Road	
Jinshui District				Huayuan Rd.	Huayuan Road	
Jinshui District				Wenhua Rd.	Wenhua Road	
Jinshui District				Fengqing Rd.	Fengqing Road	Westbound exit and eastbound entrance only
Jinshui District				Nanyang Rd.	Nanyang Road	Westbound exit, eastbound exit and entrance only
Jinshui District				Jingguang Expwy	Jingguang Expressway	Designed to be a complete interchange, some ramps are still under construction
Zhongyuan District				Songshan Rd.	Songshan N. Road	Westbound exit and eastbound entrance only
Zhongyuan District				Tongbai Rd.	Tongbai N. Road	Eastbound exit, westbound exit and entrance only
Zhongyuan District				Dianchang Rd.	Dianchang Road	Westbound exit and eastbound entrance only
Zhongyuan District				3rd Ring (W) Rd.	West 3rd Ring Road	
Zhongyuan District				Ruida Rd.	Ruida Road	Westbound exit and eastbound entrance only
Zhongyuan District						Western terminus
Continues west as Huagong Road
Closed/former; Concurrency terminus; HOV only; Incomplete access; Tolled; Route transition; Unopened
