= Longhai Expressway =

Road in Zhengzhou, Henan, China

- 陇海快速路
- Longhai Elevated Road 陇海高架路
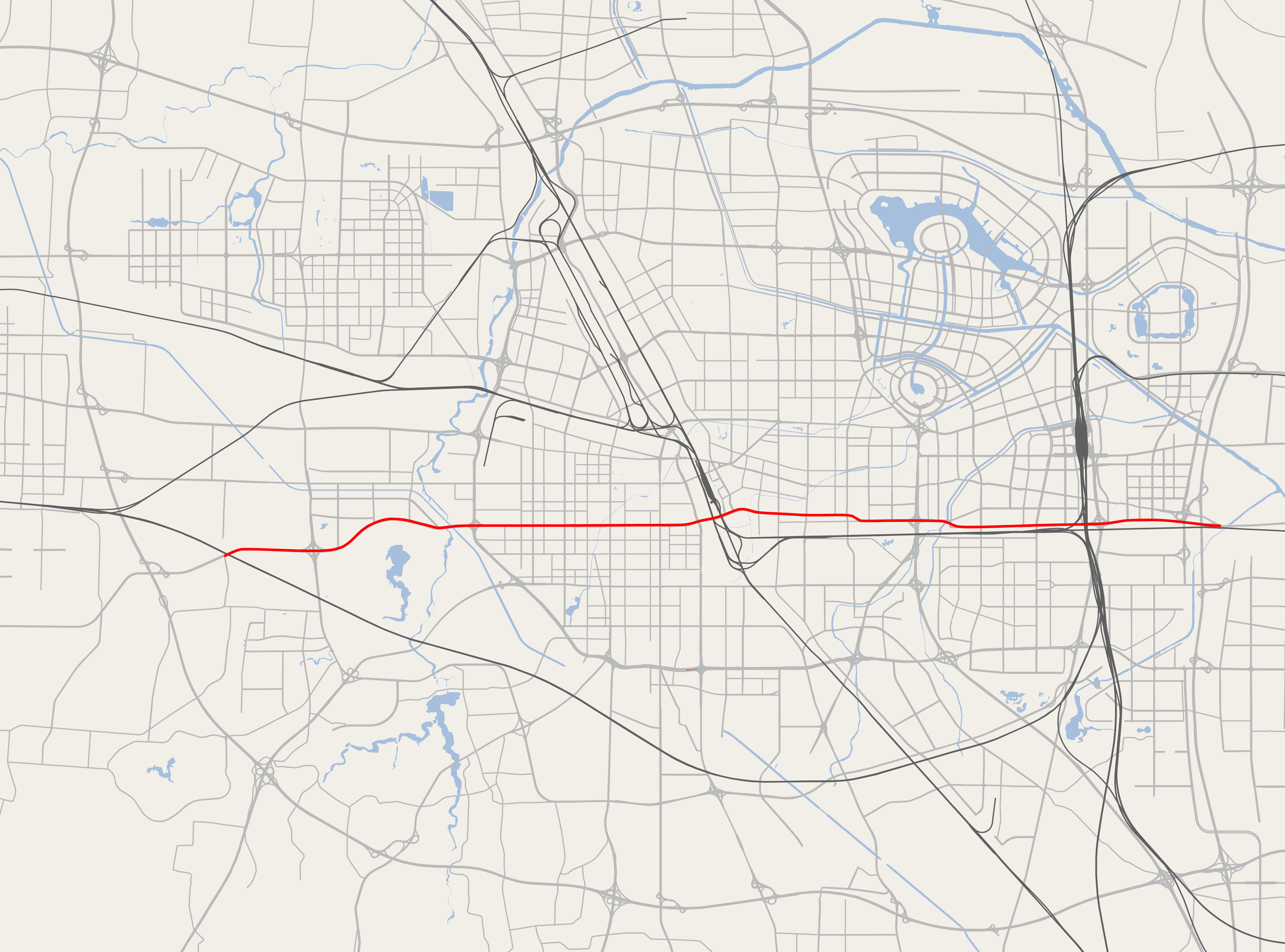

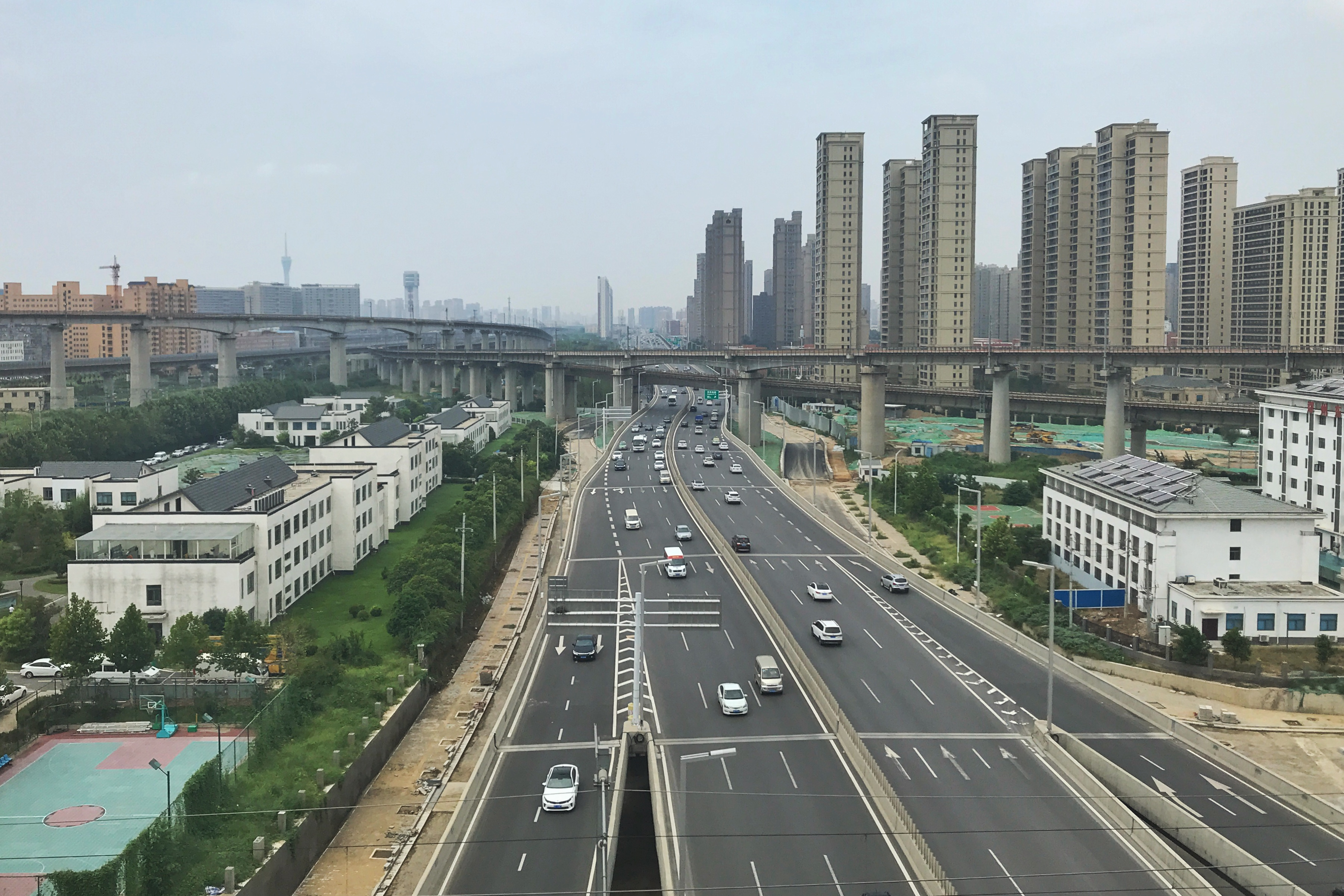
- Longhai Expressway near East 3rd Ring Road

Route information
- Length: 26.5 km (16.5 mi)
- Existed: 2015–present

Major junctions
- East end: G220 / G310 in Guancheng Hui District, Zhengzhou, Henan
- G4; East 3rd Ring Road; Zhongzhou Avenue; Henan S1; Jingguang Expressway; West 3rd Ring Road; West 4th Ring Road
- West end: Xintian Avenue in Zhongyuan District, Zhengzhou, Henan

Location
- Country: China

Highway system
- Transport in China

The Longhai Expressway (Chinese: 陇海快速路) is a 26.5-kilometre (16.5 mi) long elevated expressway in Zhengzhou, Henan, China.

The construction of the expressway began in 2013 and was finished in 2015. The maximum speed on the expressway is 80 km/h.

== Route ==
The expressway eastern terminus is at Shangdu Avenue (G220 / G310). It is then elevated above Anping Road, Yongping Road, Huozhan Street, and Longhai Road from east to west.

The Route B5 of Zhengzhou BRT runs mostly under this elevated expressway.

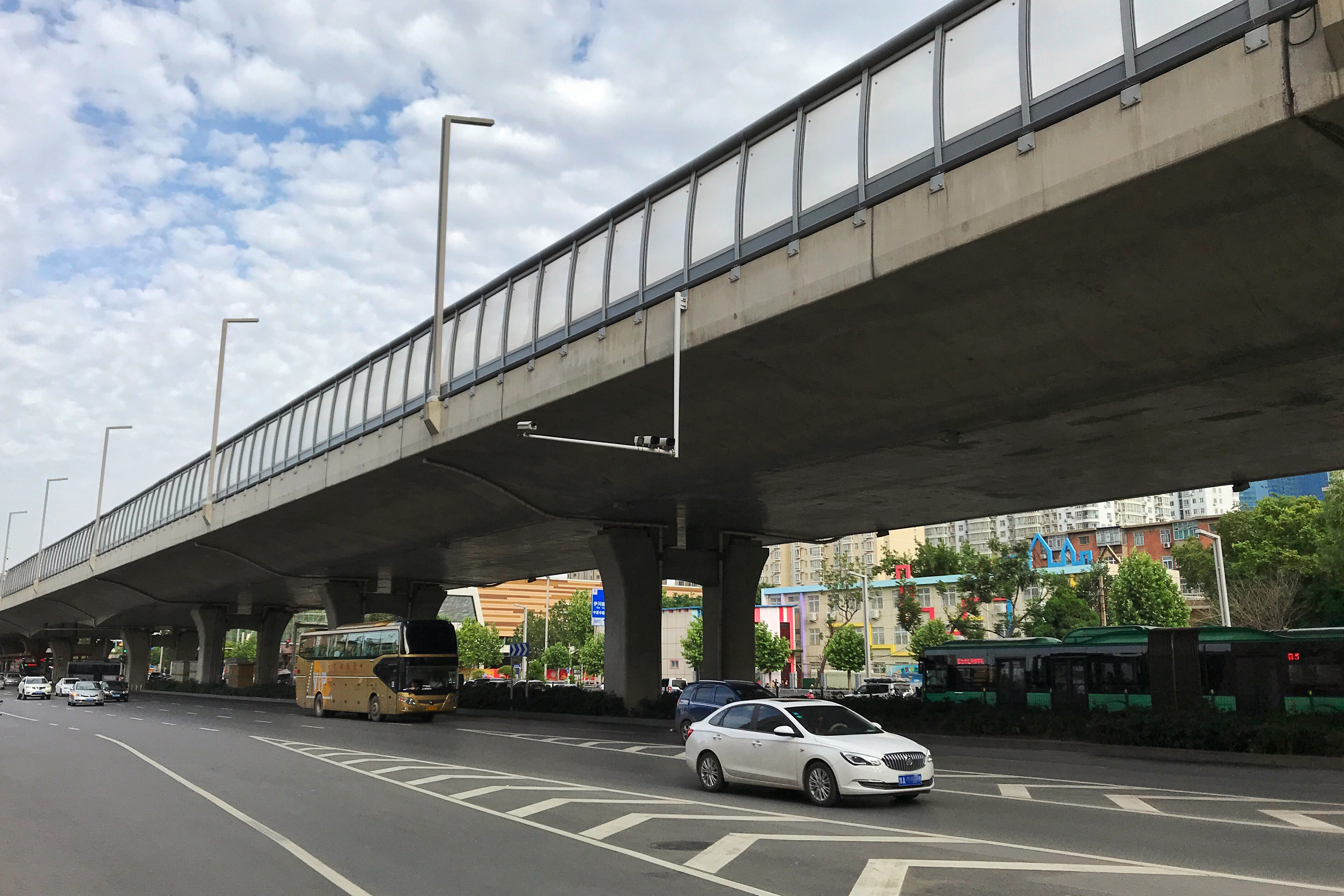
Longhai Expressway near Songshan S. Road

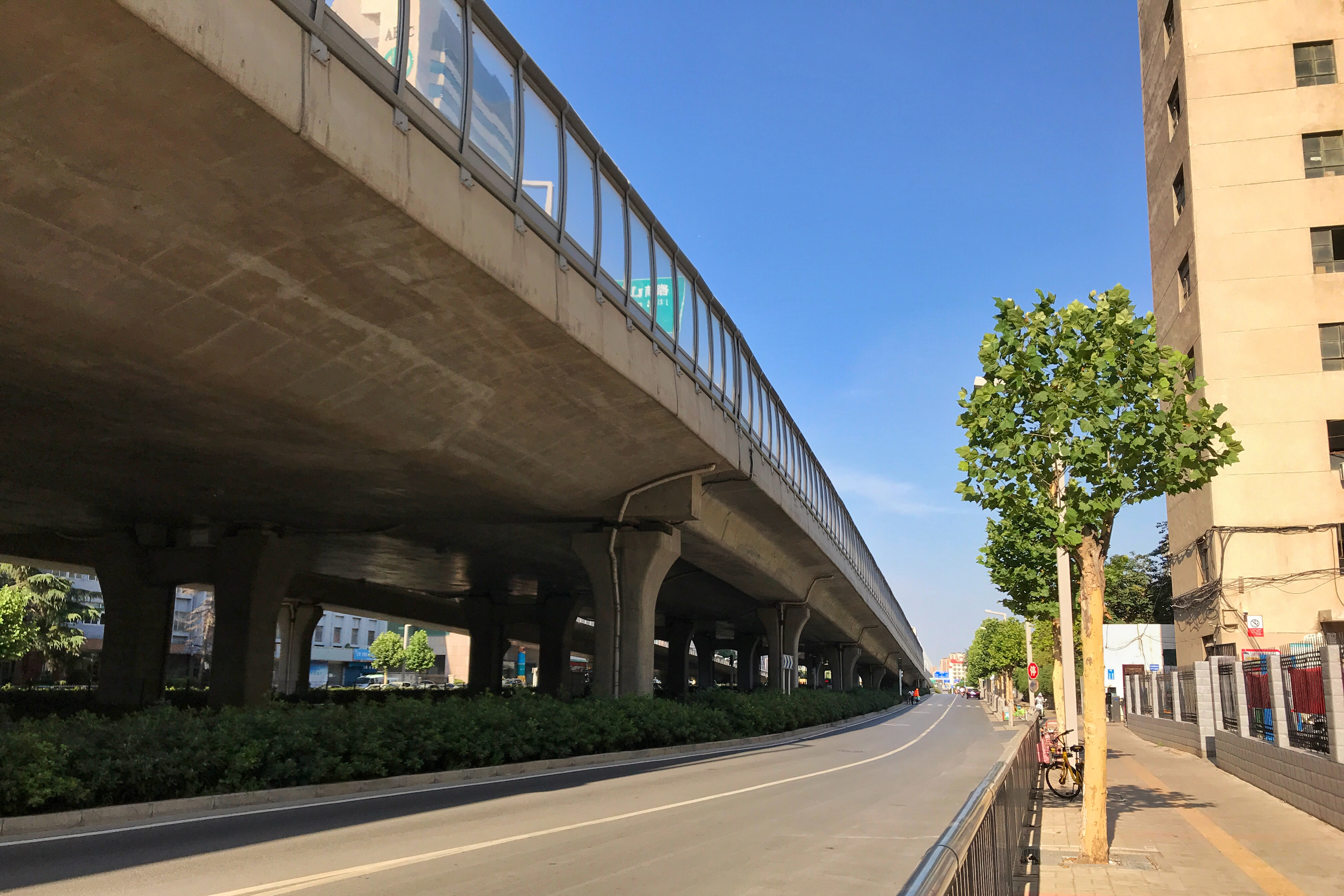
Longhai Expressway near Gongren Road

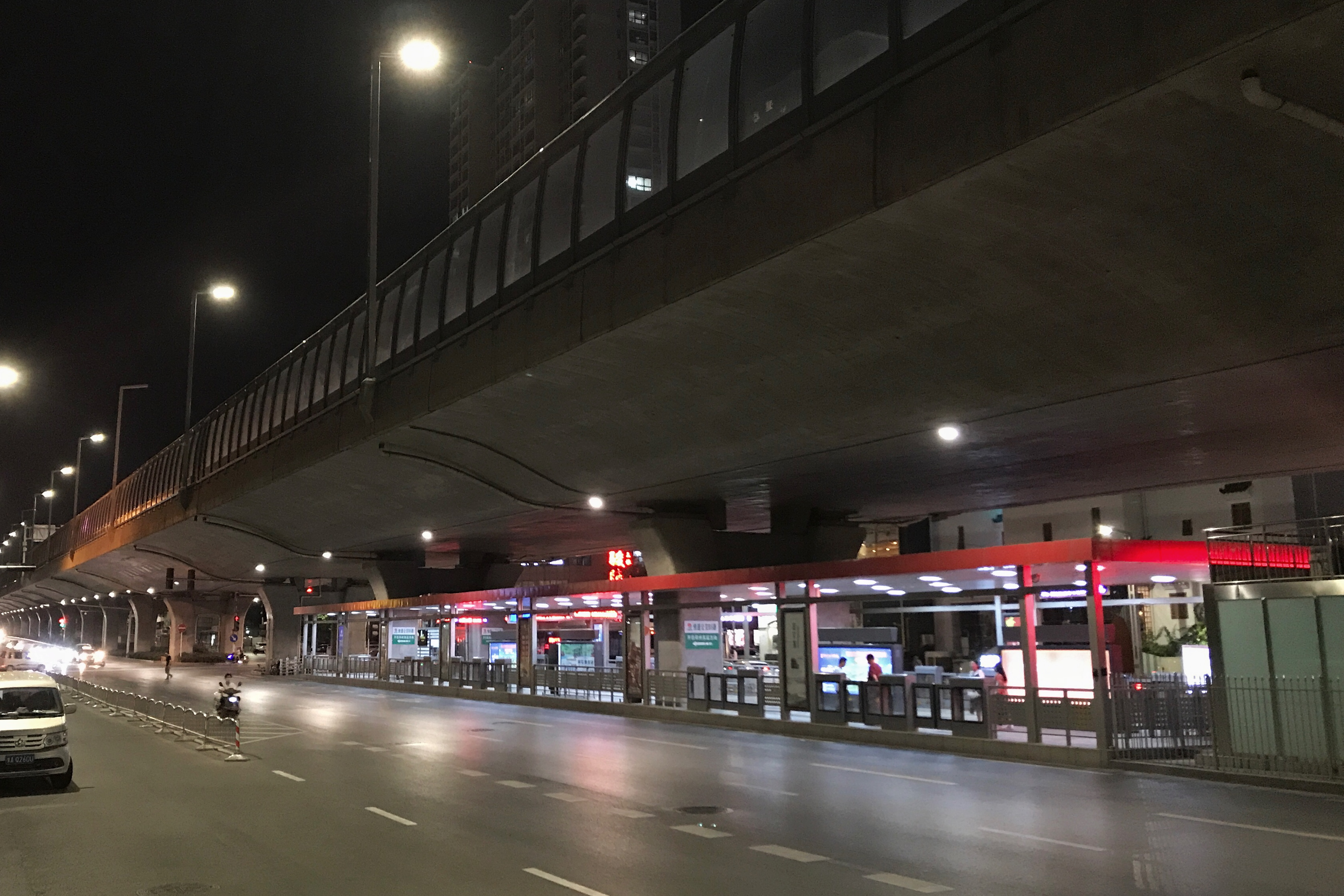
Night view of Longhai Expressway (near Qinling Road, with a station of Zhengzhou BRT under the elevated road.)

== Exit list ==
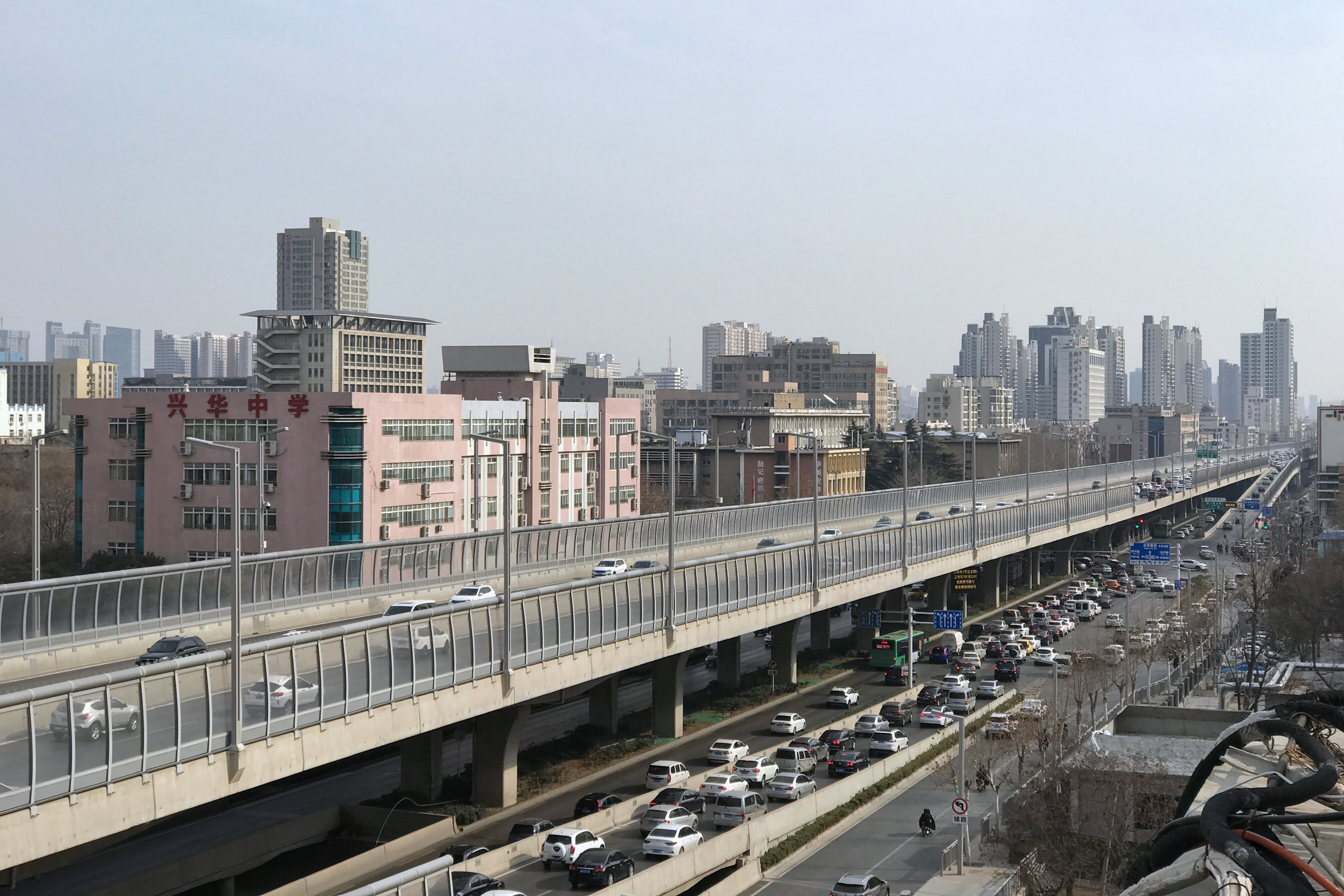
Longhai Expressway near Songshan S. Road

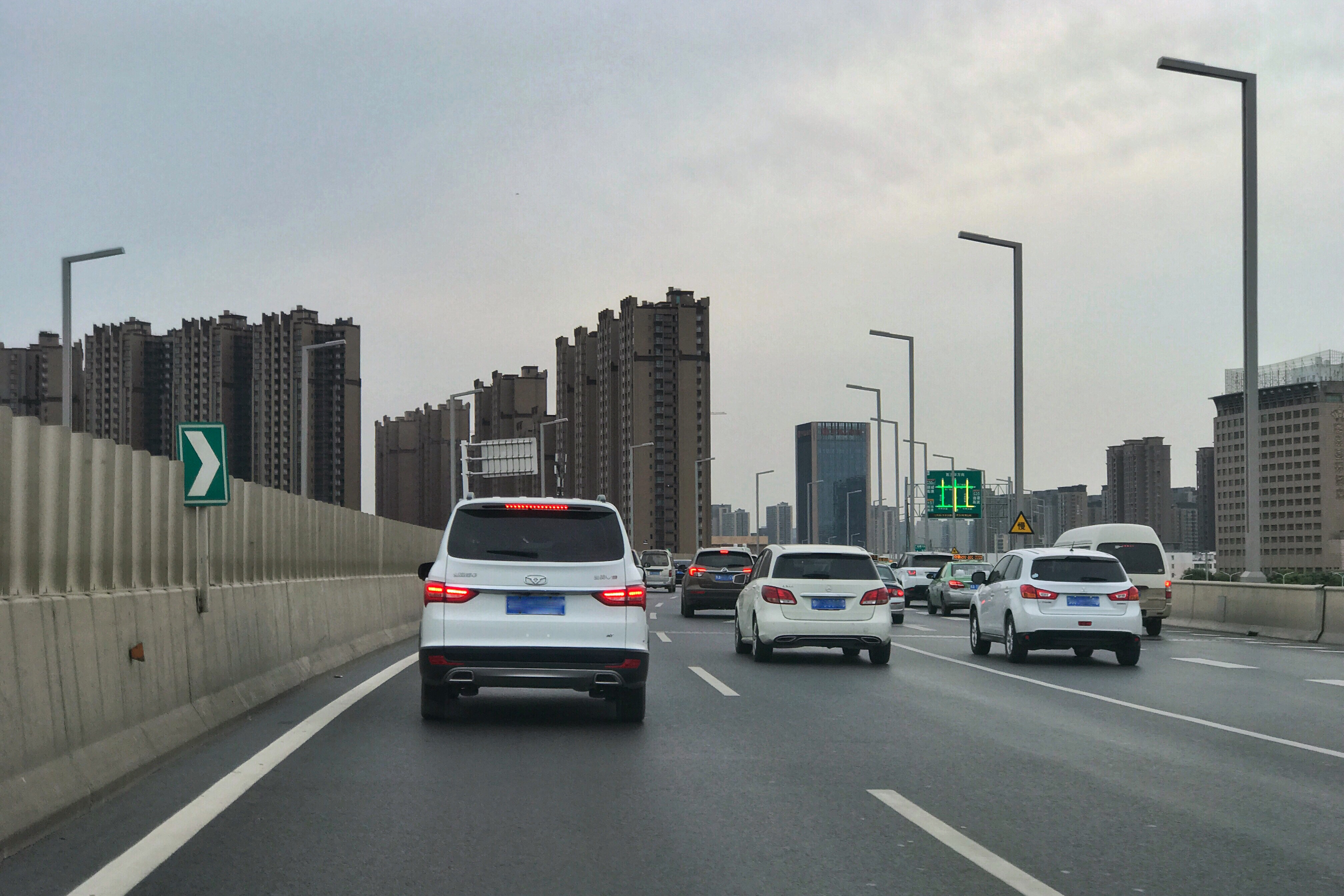
Longhai Expressway near Huanghe S. Rd. exit

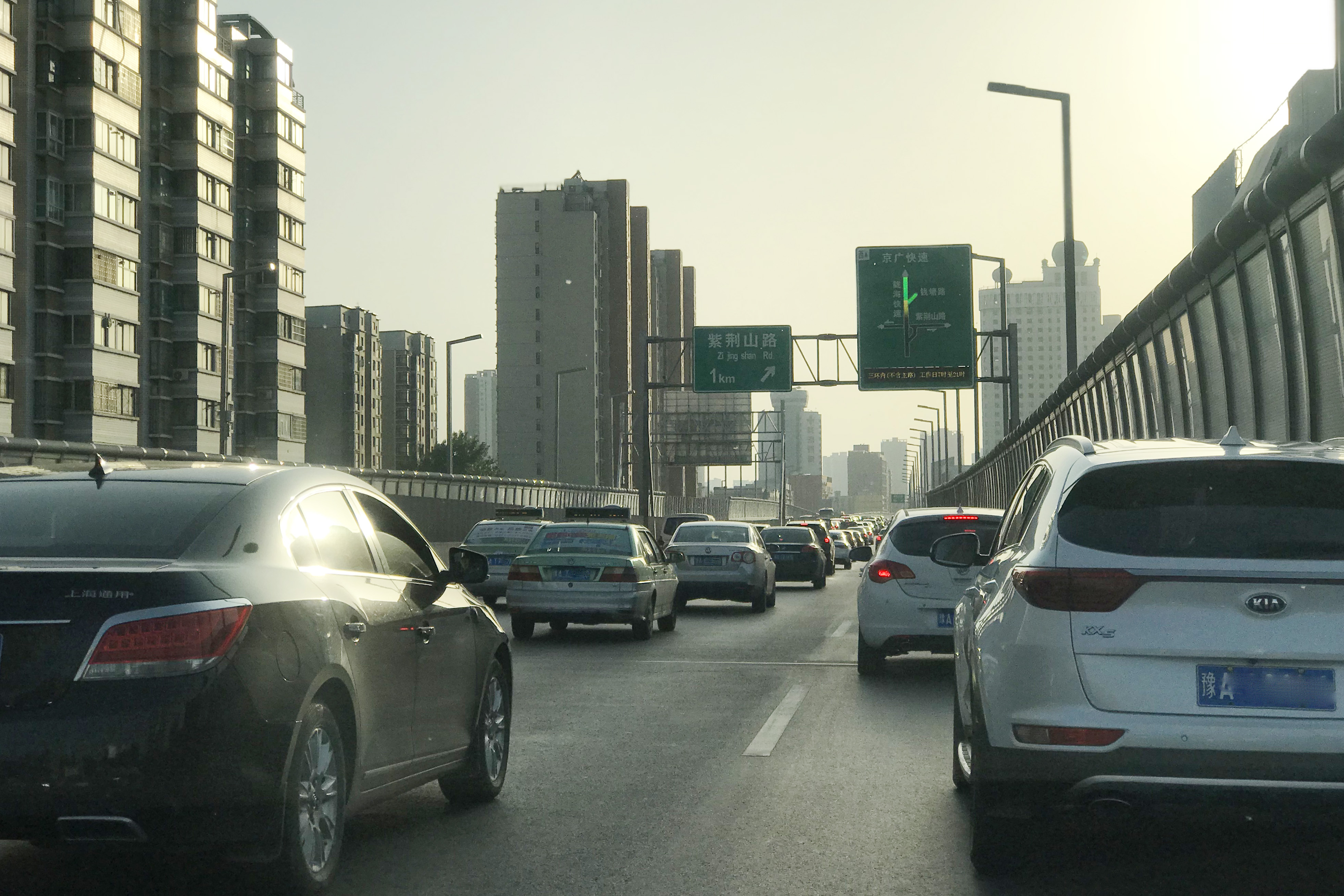
Longhai Expressway near Zijingshan Rd. exit

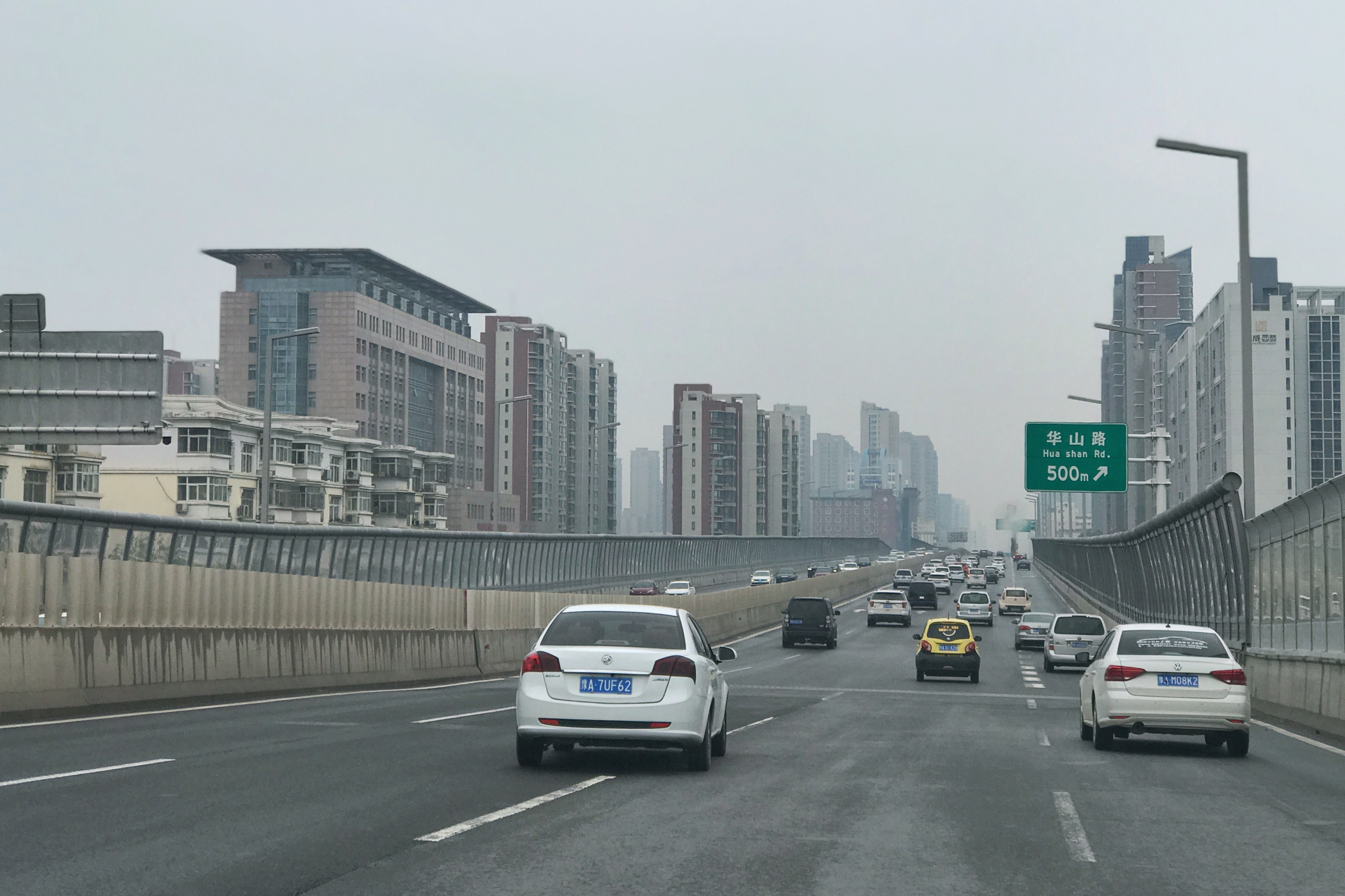
Longhai Expressway between W. 3rd Ring Rd. and Huashan Rd. exit

From east to west:

Location	km	mi	Exit	Name	Destinations	Notes
Longhai Expressway
Continues east as G220 / G310 (Shangdu Avenue)
Guancheng Hui District	0	0	0	Shangdu Avenue	G220 / G310 (Shangdu Avenue) – Zhongmu	Eastern terminus
Guancheng Hui District				Jinggao'ao Expwy	G4 – Xinxiang, Xuchang	Westbound entrance and eastbound exit only
Guancheng Hui District				Mingli Road	Mingli Road	Westbound entrance and eastbound exit only
Guancheng Hui District				E. 3rd Ring Road	East 3rd Ring Road – Zhengzhou East railway station	
Guancheng Hui District				Dongfeng S. Road	Dongfeng S. Road	
Guancheng Hui District				Huanghe S. Road	Huanghe S. Road	
Jinshui District				Zhongzhou Avenue	Zhongzhou Avenue – Zhengdong New Area CBD; Henan S1 – Zhengzhou Xinzheng International Airport	
Guancheng Hui District				Weilai Road	Weilai Road	
Guancheng Hui District				Zijingshan Road	Zijingshan Road	
Guancheng Hui District				Qiantang Road	Yima Road; Qiantang Road – Zhengzhou railway station (east)	Westbound exit only
Erqi District				Yima Road	Yima Road; Qiantang Road – Zhengzhou railway station (east)	Westbound and eastbound entrance, eastbound exit
Erqi District				Jingguang Road	Jingguang Expressway; Jingguang Road – Zhengzhou railway station (west)	Westbound entrance, westbound and eastbound exits to northbound Jingguang Expressway
Erqi District				Daxue Road	Daxue Road	Westbound exit and eastbound entrance only
Erqi District and Zhongyuan District				Songshan S. Road	Songshan S. Road	
Zhongyuan District				Tongbai S. Road	Tongbai S. Road	Westbound exit, westbound and eastbound entrance
Zhongyuan District				Huashan Road	Huashan Road	Westbound entrance and eastbound exit
Zhongyuan District				W. 3rd Ring Road	West 3rd Ring Road	
Zhongyuan District				Fumin Road	Fumin Road	
Zhongyuan District				W. 4th Ring Road	West 4th Ring Road	
Zhongyuan District				Changzhou Road	Changzhou Road	Westbound exit and eastbound entrance only
Zhongyuan District				Xintian Avenue	Xintian Avenue	Western terminus
Continues west as Longhai W. Road
Closed/former; Concurrency terminus; HOV only; Incomplete access; Tolled; Route transition; Unopened
