= Shangjie, Zhengzhou =

Shangjie 上街区
- District
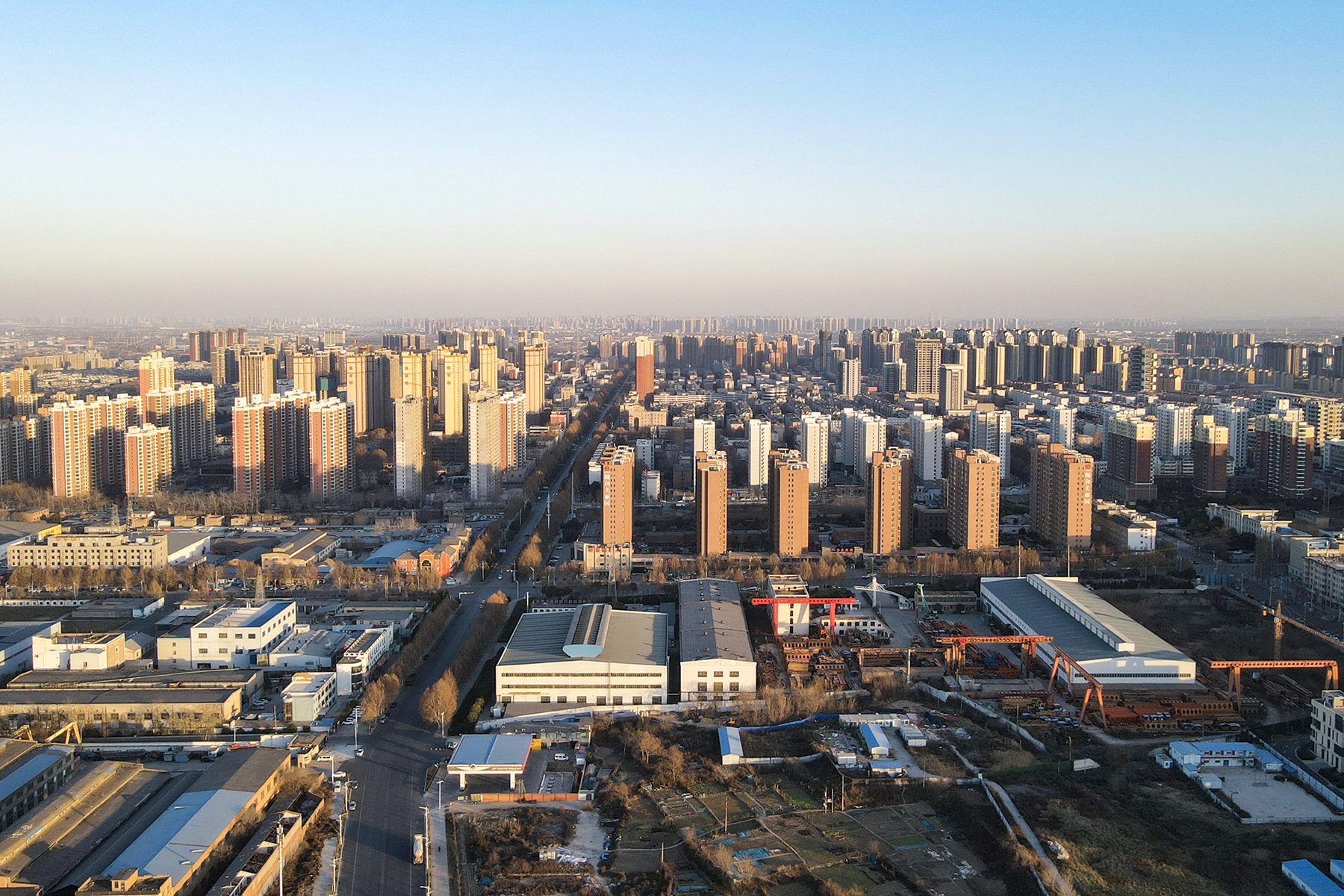
- Skyline of Shangjie District

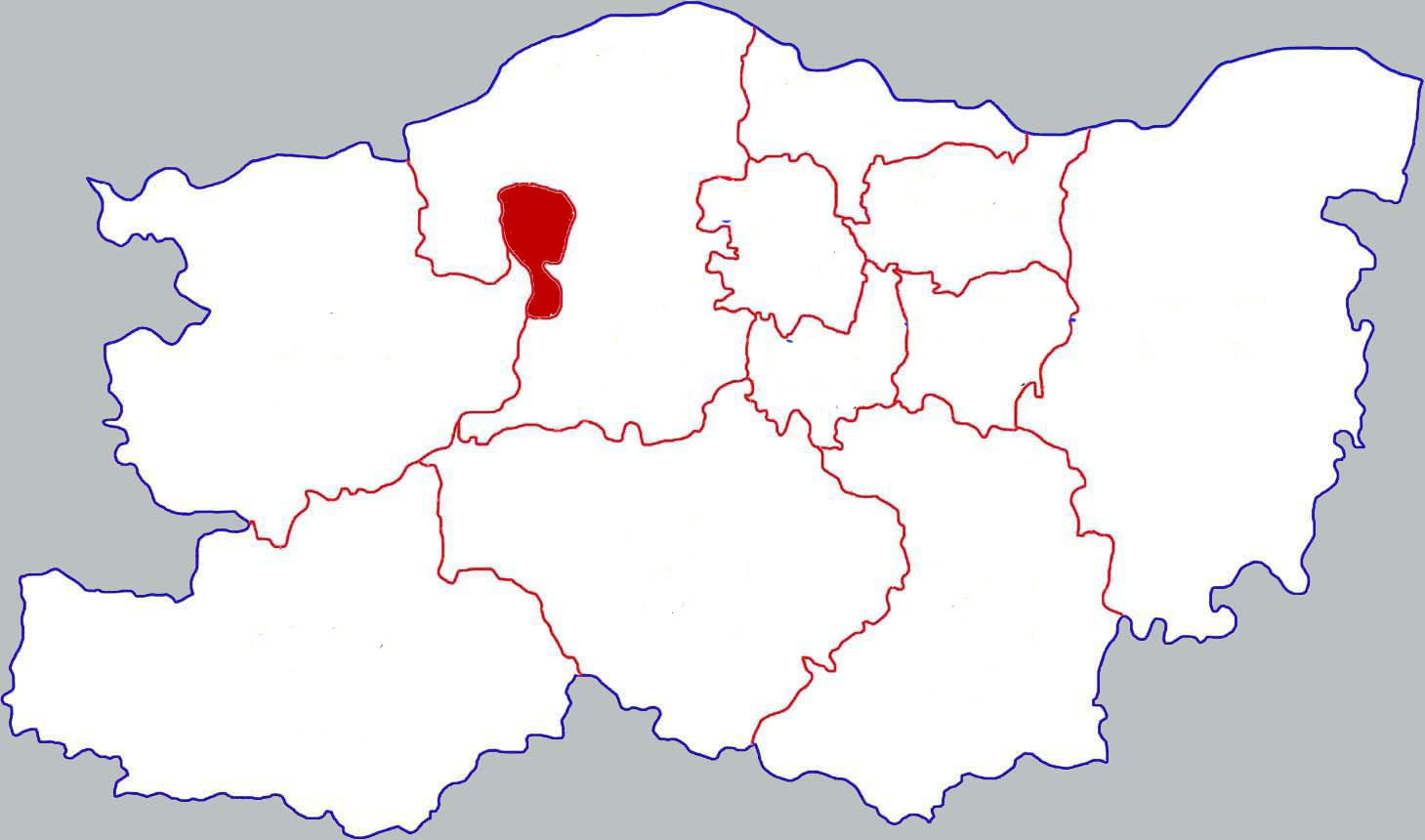
- Location in Zhengzhou

- Location in Henan
- Coordinates: 34°48′10″N 113°18′32″E
- Country: People's Republic of China
- Province: Henan
- Prefecture-level city: Zhengzhou
- Township-level divisions: 5 subdistricts 1 town
- District seat: Jiyuan Road Subdistrict (济源路街道)

Area
  - Total: 18 km^{2} (6.9 sq mi)
- Elevation: 159 m (522 ft)

Population (2019)
  - Total: 144,000
  - Density: 8,000/km^{2} (21,000/sq mi)
- Time zone: UTC+8 (China Standard)
- Postal code: 450041
- Website: www.zzsj.gov.cn

Shangjie (Chinese: 上街; pinyin: Shàngjiē; lit. 'upper street') is one of 6 urban districts of the prefecture-level city of Zhengzhou, the capital of Henan Province, South Central China, located about 38 kilometres (24 mi) west of the city proper in between the Yellow River to the north and Mount Song to the south; it is not contiguous with the other five districts of Zhengzhou. Shangjie District was established as an industrial zone in 1958. It has an area of 64.7 square kilometres (25.0 sq mi) and a population of about 130,000.

== Administrative divisions ==
There are five subdistricts and one town under the district's administration:

Subdistricts

- Jiyuanlu Subdistrict (济源路街道)
- Zhongxinlu Subdistrict (中心路街道)
- Xin'anlu Subdistrict (新安路街道)
- Gongyelu Subdistrict (工业路街道)
- Kuangshan Subdistrict (矿山街道)

Towns

- Xiawo (峡窝镇)
