= Yutong =

Chinese manufacturer of commercial vehicles

Zhengzhou Yutong Group Co., Ltd.
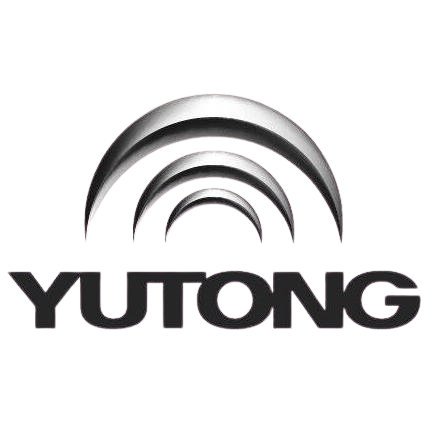
- Industry: Automotive
- Founded: 1963; 63 years ago (as Zhengzhou Bus Repair Factory); 1993; 33 years ago (as Zhengzhou Yutong Bus Co., Ltd.)
- Headquarters: *Guancheng Hui District, Zhengzhou, Henan: San Felipe, Venezuela
- Area served: Worldwide (except North America)
- Key people: Tang Yuxiang (Chairman and General Manager)
- Products: Buses; Construction equipment
- Website: www.yutong.com

Yutong
- Simplified Chinese: 郑州宇通客车股份有限公司
- Traditional Chinese: 鄭州宇通客車股份有限公司
- Literal meaning: Zhengzhou Yutong Group Co., Ltd.
Transcriptions
Standard Mandarin
- Hanyu Pinyin: Zhèngzhōu Yǔtōng kèchē gǔfèn yǒuxiàn gōngsī

Trading name
- Simplified Chinese: 宇通客车
- Traditional Chinese: 宇通客車
- Literal meaning: Yutong Group
Transcriptions
Standard Mandarin
- Hanyu Pinyin: Yǔtōng kèchē

Yutong (officially Zhengzhou Yutong Group Co., Ltd.) is a Chinese manufacturer of commercial vehicles, especially electric buses, headquartered in Zhengzhou, Henan. Yutong also has businesses in construction machinery, real estate, and other investments. As of 2026, Yutong is recognized as the world's largest bus and coach manufacturer by volume, producing approximately 150,000 vehicles annually. By the end of 2025, Yutong's cumulative sales of new energy buses had exceeded 210,000 units. The company holds over 10% of the global market share and 36% of the domestic market share, holding the leadership in new energy (electric) buses manufacturing, operating one of the largest specialized production facilities in the industry.

== History ==
Yutong's origins can be traced to the Zhengzhou Bus Repair Factory, which was established in 1963. Zhengzhou Yutong Bus Co., Ltd. was founded in 1993; and in March 1997, Yutong became the first bus company in China on the Shanghai Stock Exchange. The following year, Yutong opened its ¥400 million ($50,000,000 in 1999) Yutong Industrial Park in Zhengzhou, which was the largest bus factory in Asia at the time.

By 2005, Yutong had a 22% market share of buses and coaches across China, becoming China's biggest bus manufacturer, and had won an award for being the best manufacturer in China by the World Bus Alliance. In March, Yutong began exporting buses worldwide to markets such as Latin and South America, Asia-Pacific, and Europe.

Yutong first entered into the electric bus market with the opening of its 'New Energy' manufacturing plant in 2012, and in 2014, opened the National Research Center on Electronic Control and Safety Engineering Technology of Electric Buses in conjunction with the Chinese government. In 2015, Yutong conducted the world's first road trials of an autonomous bus, demonstrating self-driving technology on a 32.6 kilometres (20.3 mi) drive on a highway between the cities of Zhengzhou and Kaifeng.

As of 2018, Yutong had exported more than 64,000 buses and coaches, with nearly 25,000 of these in 2017 being either battery electric or CNG-powered. The company's sales and service network covers six regions worldwide: Europe, the Commonwealth of Independent States, Latin America, Africa, Asia-Pacific and the Middle East, and Yutong buses and coaches have been delivered to over 60 countries and regions in the world.

== Yutong Bus ==
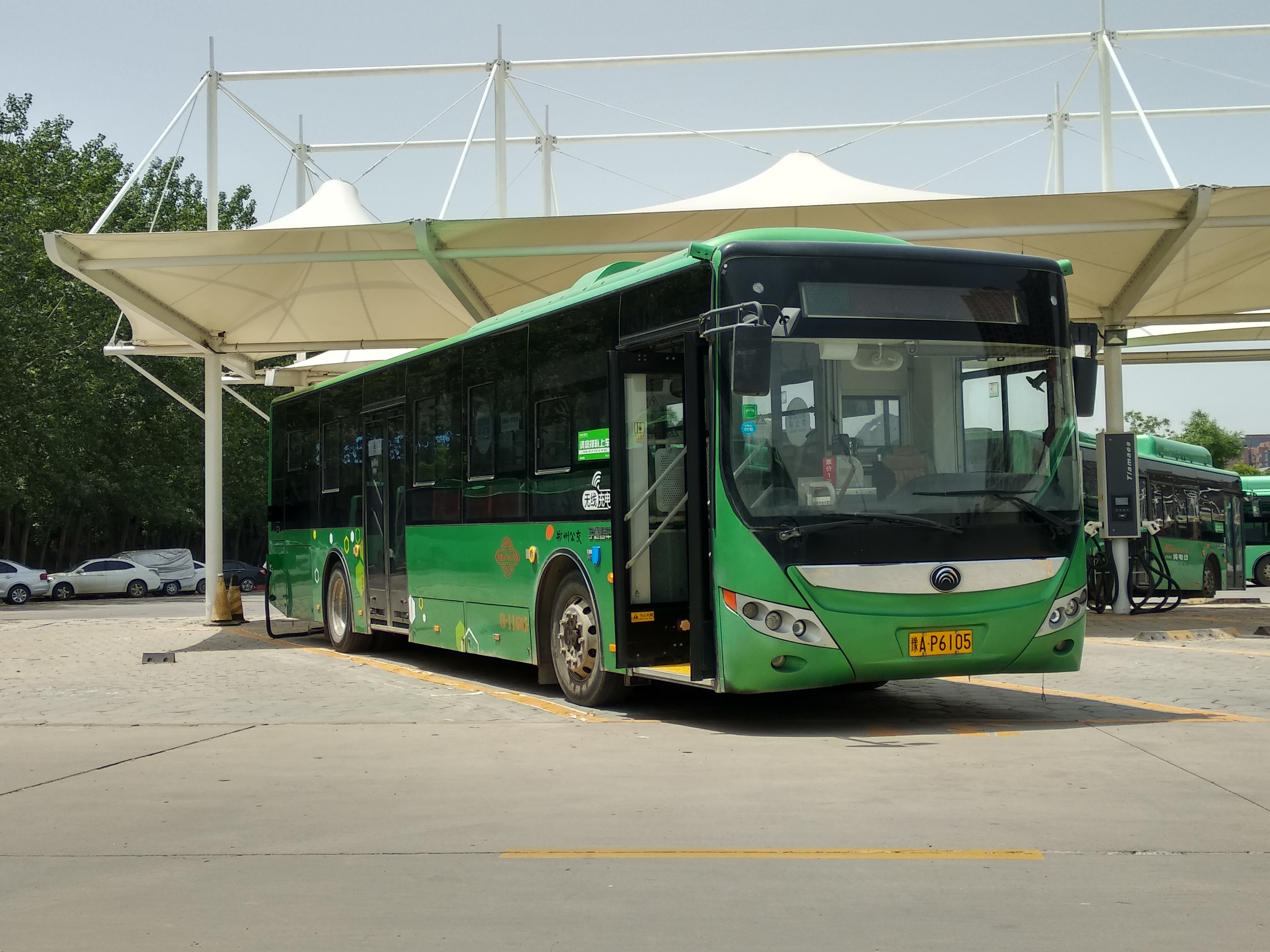
Yutong electric bus being charged at a depot.

Zhengzhou Yutong Bus Co., Ltd. (referred to as Yutong Bus) is a large-scale modern manufacturing company specializing in the research and development, manufacturing and sales of bus products. Its main plant is located in the Yutong Industrial Park (宇通工业园) in Guancheng Hui District, Zhengzhou, and covers an area of 1.12 million square meters. The 'New Energy' manufacturing plant of Yutong Bus which was put into operation in 2012, covers an area of over 1.33 million square meters and has an annual production capacity of 30,000 buses and coaches. As of January 2025, the highest capacity is 630 kWh.

Yutong Bus also operates a number of completely knocked down manufacturing plants worldwide. A manufacturing plant in the western Venezuelan state of Yaracuy was opened in December 2015, and in collaboration with Pakistani heavy vehicle manufacturing company Master Motors, Yutong Bus opened a manufacturing plant at Port Qasim in Karachi in 2016, where buses are manufactured under the brand name Yutong-Master. Yutong Bus also plans to open a final assembly plant in Castleford in the United Kingdom, where Yutong buses and coaches are distributed in UK and Ireland through the Pelican Bus and Coach dealership.

=== Products ===
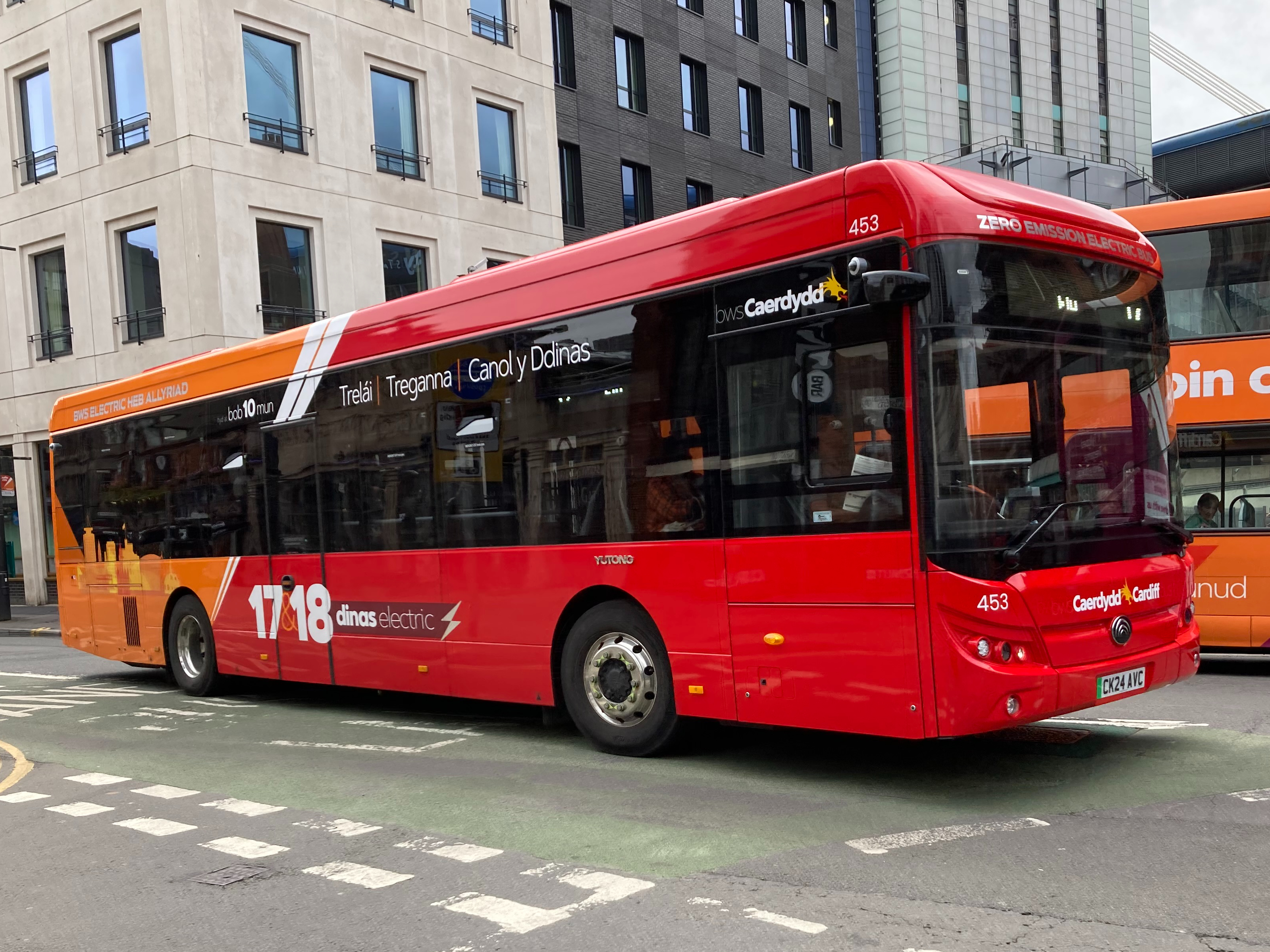
Yutong bus in the United Kingdom.

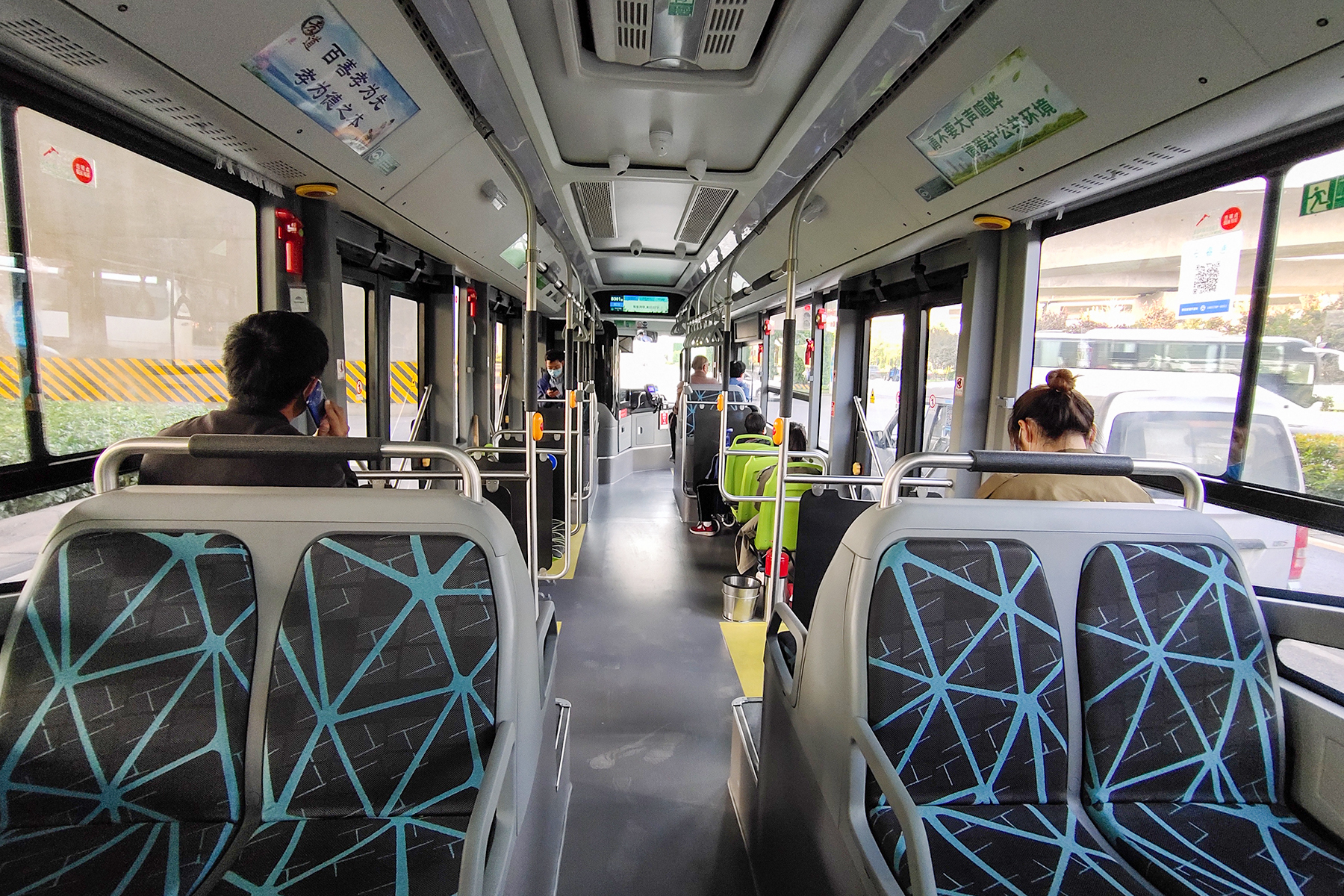
Interior of a Yutong U12 bus.

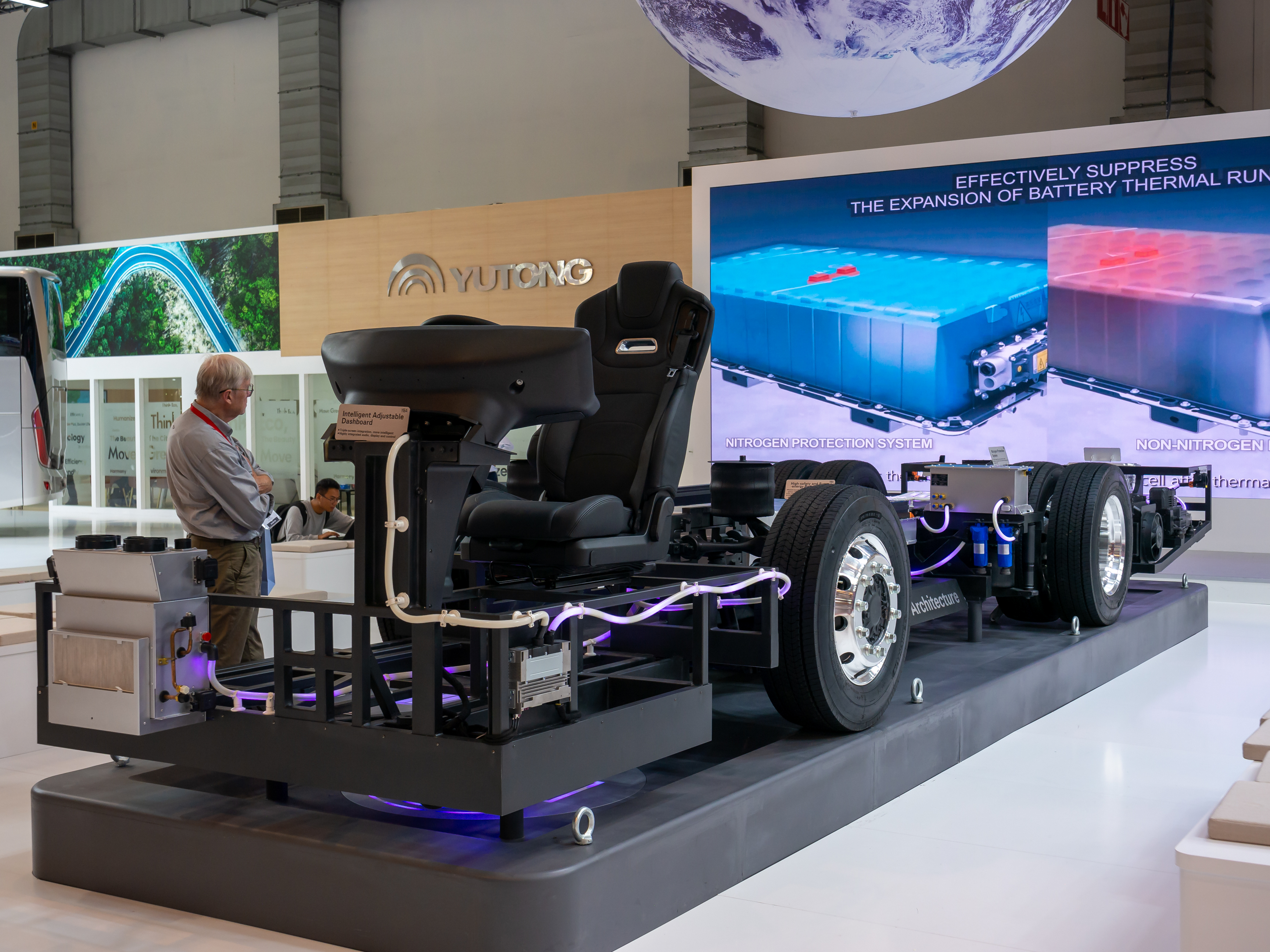
Exhibit showing the inner frame structure of a bus.

- City Master, a retro style double-decker bus based on the AEC Routemaster, built exclusively for Skopje, North Macedonia
- E8 electric midibus
- E9L electric city bus
- E10/E12 electric city bus
- E12DD electric (2-Door)
- U12 electric city bus
- U11DD electric (single-door)
- U12DD electric (3-Door and 2-Staircase)
- CL6/CL7 coach
- T7 minibus / limousine
- GT12/C122 coach
- TCe12/ICe12 coach – up to 50 seats, 350 kW (470 hp), 281kWh Lithium Iron Phosphate water-cooled battery, range over 200 mi (320 km)
- ZK6122HD9 coach
- ZK6108HG city bus
- ZK6118HGA city bus
- ZK6122H9 coach
- ZK6120D1 coach
- ZK6120HR 12-meter series
- ZK6129HCA coach
- ZK6122HD9/ZK6122H9 coach
- ZK6119H2 coach
- ZK6119HA coach
- ZK6752N1 coach
- ZK6115D front-engine bus
- ZK6729DX school bus
- ZK6669DX school bus
- ZK6107H coach
- ZK6105 coach
- ZK6100HB coach
- ZK6126HG city bus
- ZK6128HG city bus
- Tianjun/V6 van

==== Autonomous buses ====
Yutong trialled its first autonomous bus in 2015 and has produced a wide range of autonomous models since. Public trials of its first generation 8-seat Xiaoyu vehicle commenced 2019 at the Boao Forum for Asia and in Zhengzhou. Autonomous buses have also been used to transport workers around Yutong's Zhengzhou assembly plant.

In June 2021, Yutong claimed to have delivered 100 models of its 10-seat Xiaoyu 2.0 autonomous bus for use in Zhengzhou. The Xiaoyu 2.0 has also been delivered to the cities of Guangzhou, Nanjing, Zhengzhou, Sansha and Changsha, with public trials due to commence in July 2021 in Zhengzhou.

=== Exports ===
==== Cuba ====
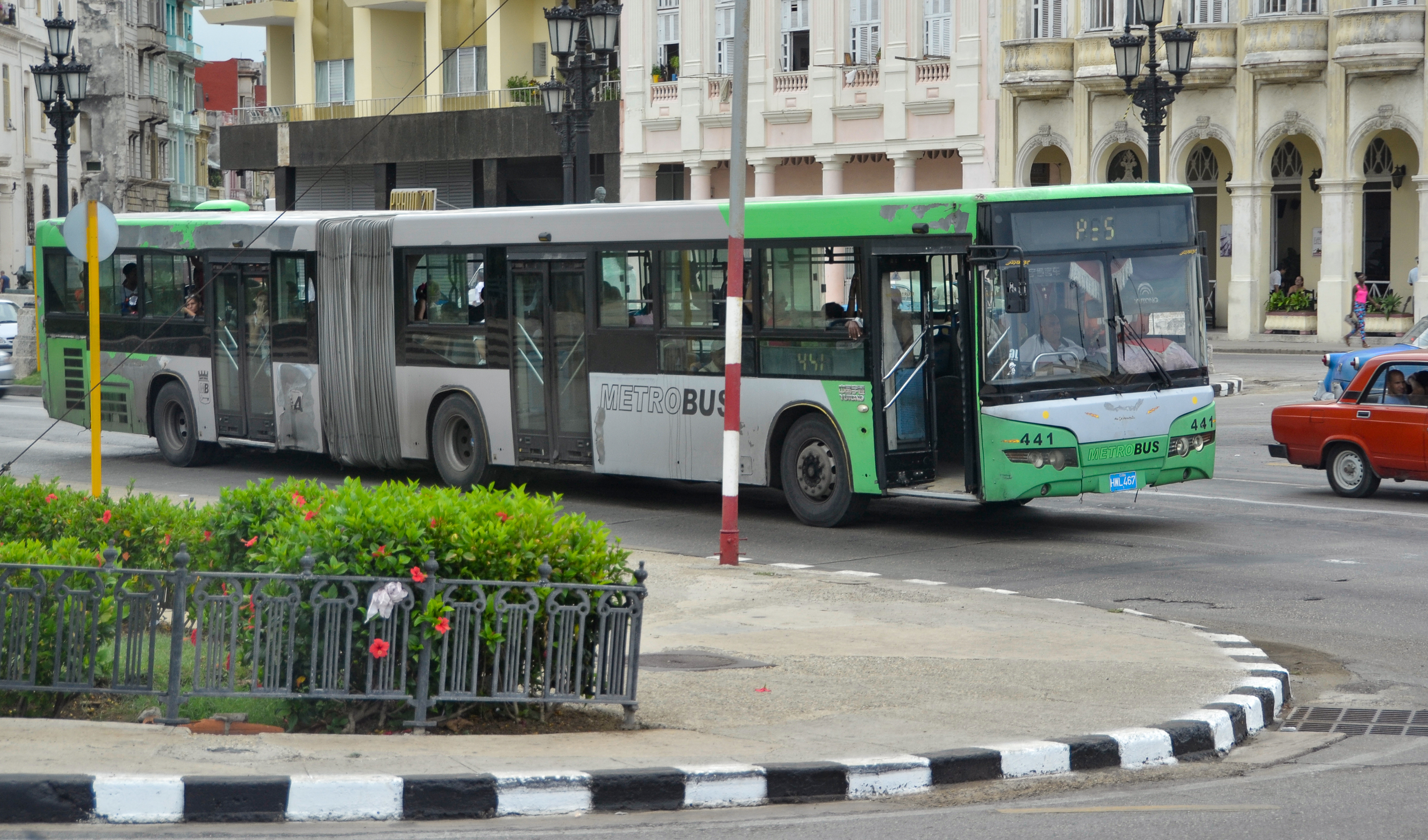
A Yutong articulated bus of Havana MetroBus, Route P-5 (2014)

Yutong holds a strong presence in Cuba since entering the Cuban bus market in 2005. That May, Yutong exported 400 buses to the country, which at the time set an export record for a Chinese bus manufacturer. This record was broken in October by an order for 630 buses, then broken again in May 2007 by an export order for 5,348 buses. By 2017, Yutong had sold over 6,000 buses and coaches for service across Cuba.

In November 2017, Yutong delivered Cuba's first electric bus, a Yutong E12, which entered service in the country's capital with the Havana Transit Company.

==== Spain ====
Ten Yutong ZK6140BD airside buses, equipped with six doors and capable of carrying 160 passengers, were delivered to Madrid Airport in April 2019.

Sri Lanka

Yutong entered the Sri Lankan market in 2010, gaining significant visibility in 2013 when it supplied 100 ZK6930H luxury coaches for the Commonwealth Heads of Government Meeting (CHOGM).

In June 2025, the brand announced a strategic return through a partnership with NCG Holdings. Within the first year of this collaboration, 230 units were imported to the country. These vehicles serve dual roles: operating on major public transport routes via modern digital ticketing system and serving the private tourism industry with luxury models like the C12 PRO. The partnership includes a 24/7 emergency response system and a nationwide service network to support the rapidly growing fleet.

==== Portugal ====
Auto Viação Feirense, the biggest Portuguese operator for Flixbus, ordered two ICE12 buses to operate the routes between Lisbon and Porto, and between Porto and Bragança. They also have some E9 buses that they operate in UNIR Mobilidade's Lote 4 and in a subcontracting agreement with Alsa in Lote 2 and Carris Metropolitana's Area 4.

In the Lisbon Metropolitan Area, bus operators for Carris Metropolitana's Area 1 (Viação Alvorada) and Area 4 (Alsa Todi) bought many buses from the E9, U12 and IC12E models, between 2025 and 2026. In Cascais Municipality, the operator for MobiCascais, Casbuscais, bought, in 2026, from the E9 and U10 models. In Barreiro, the municipality's bus operator, TCB, between 2025 and 2026, received 40 electric buses - 6 E7S, 8 U10, 16 U12 and 10 U18 - that increased its fleet by 66,6%.

In the Porto Metropolitan Area, bus operator for UNIR Mobilidade's Lote 2 (Alsa) bought 53 electric buses from the U12 and IC12E models in 2026.

In Coimbra, the municipality's bus operator, SMTUC, bought 14 E12 buses and 16 E9 buses in 2026.

In January 2026, Yutong was the largest electric bus manufacturer in Portugal, when it delivered 111 buses across the country.

==== United Kingdom ====
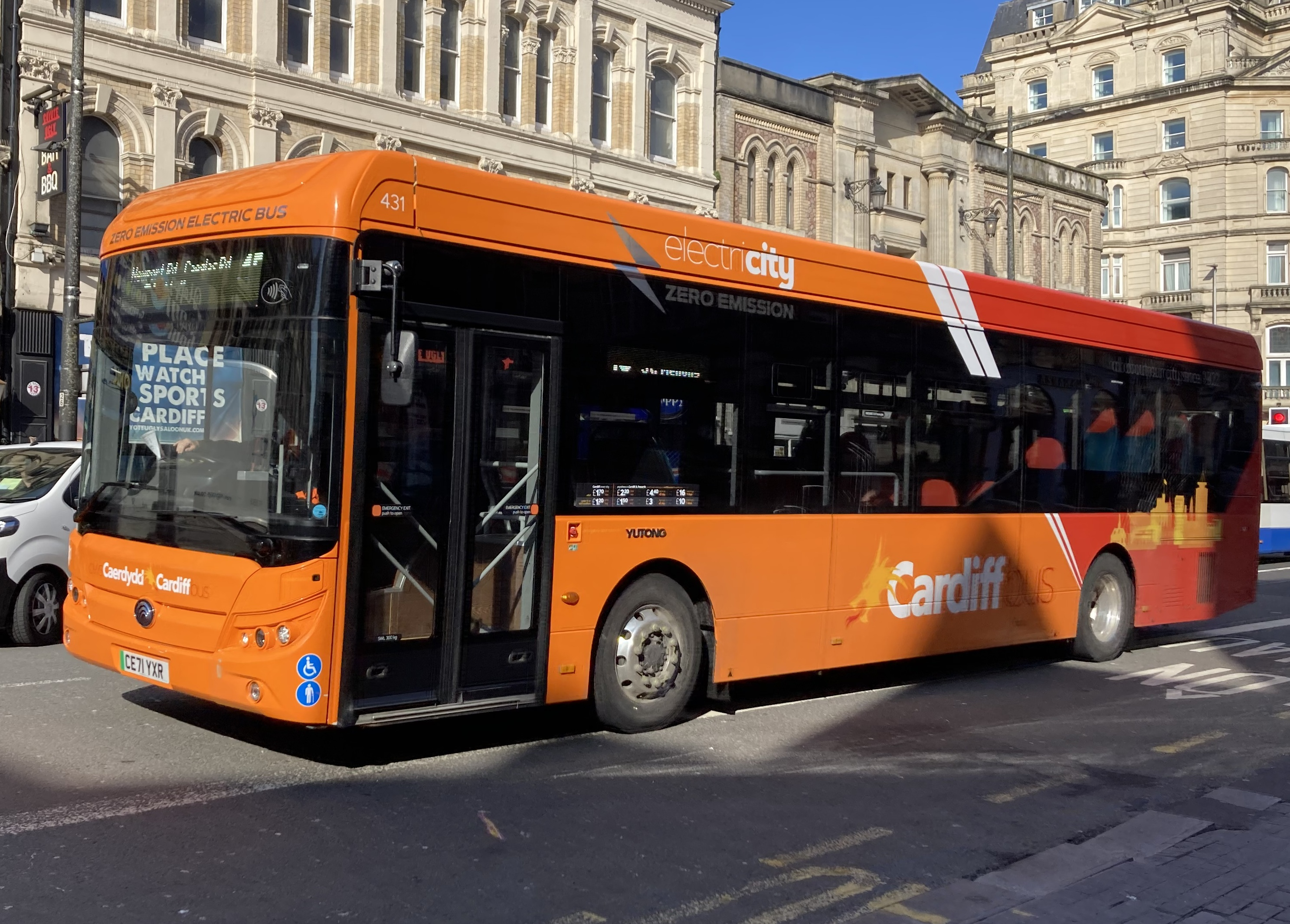
A Cardiff Bus Yutong E12 in Cardiff, Wales

Yutong first entered the United Kingdom bus and coach market in 2014 through supplying diesel-powered coaches through Pelican Bus and Coach to independent coach operators.

Yutong would become a major supplier of battery electric single-deck city buses to operators across England, Scotland and Wales through the Yutong E10 and the longer E12. Both buses are in service with a number of large operators, including McGill's Bus Services, the largest operator of Yutong buses in the United Kingdom, Newport Bus, Cardiff Bus, Go North East, Stagecoach Highlands, First West Yorkshire and Centrebus in Leicester. Yutong's battery electric TCe12 coach has also sold to a small number of coach operators across the United Kingdom, with Ember Core's fleet of TCe12s being used to operate a network of intercity express services across Scotland.

Yutong continued to expand its range of battery electric buses for UK operators from 2023 onwards, initially through launching the E9 midibus, with the first examples being delivered in early 2023 to Centrebus for the free Hop! bus service in Leicester. Two U11DD 10.9 metres (36 ft) electric double-decker buses, based on similar buses sold in the Chinese and Singaporean markets, entered service as UK market demonstrators in late 2023, while National Express Coaches took delivery of a GTe14 tri-axle electric coach for trials on coach services between Victoria Coach Station and London Stansted Airport during March 2024.

In January 2026, concern was expressed by British security experts, following an investigation by the Department for Transport and the National Cyber Security Centre, that software updates delivered from China using onboard SIM cards could be used to stop or render inoperable some Yutong busses.

Stagecoach Midlands have ordered 33 Yutong E12 buses to add to their zero-emission fleet. They have begun service and they now regularly operate alongside the standard diesel/petrol buses.

==== Malaysia ====
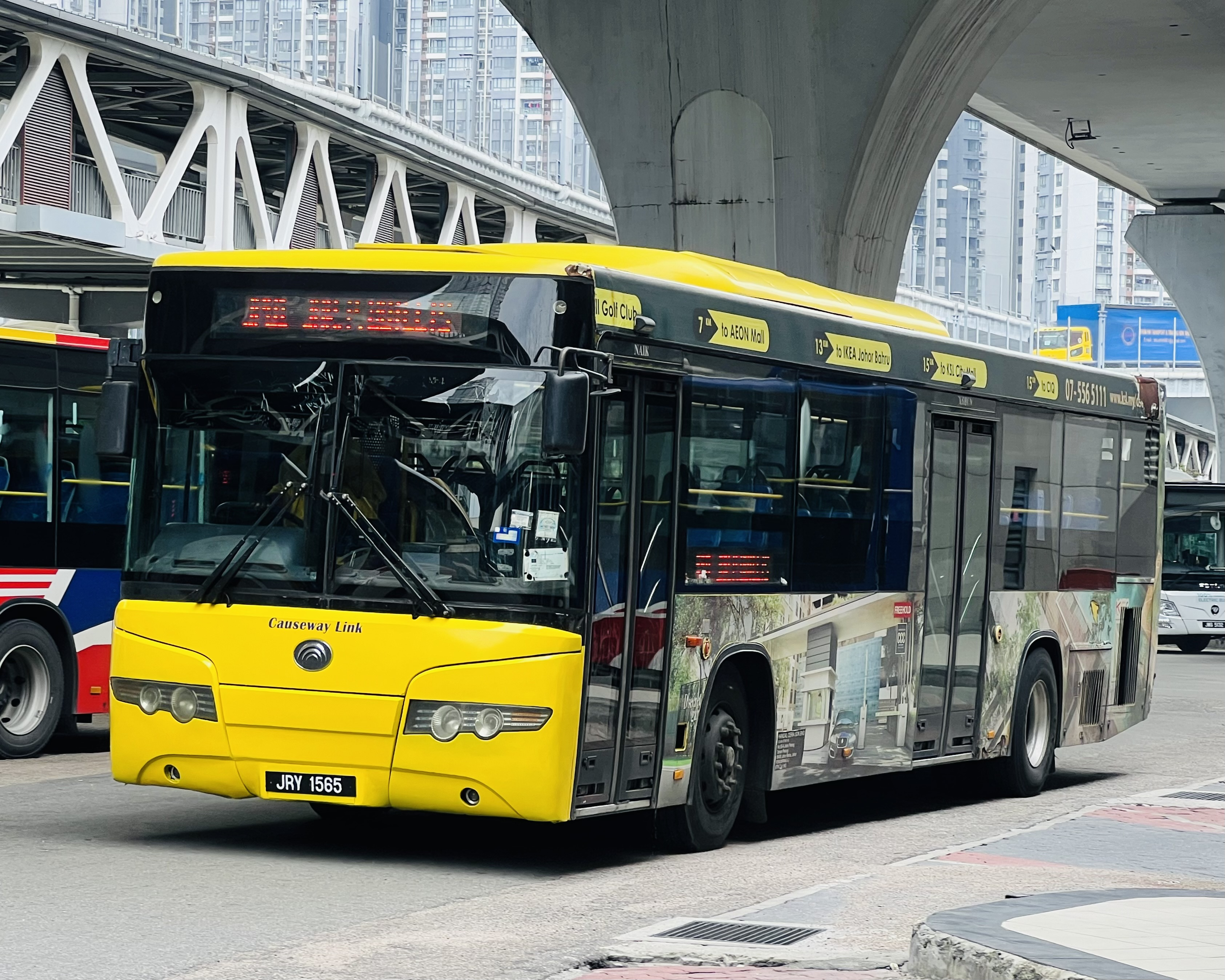
Yutong bus in Malaysia.

Public bus operator Handal Indah (Causeway Link) procured low-entry diesel Yutong ZK6118HGA, ZK6126HG, ZK6128HG and ZK6800HNGAA buses in huge quantities.

==== Saudi Arabia ====
Following a trial of a Yutong ZK6772BEV at the King Abdullah University of Science and Technology, a Yutong E11, Saudi Arabia's first electric city bus, was delivered for service in Jeddah in March 2023, part of the Saudi Vision 2030 framework towards reducing the Kingdom's dependency on oil. 550 diesel-powered Yutong C13 PRO coaches for use in Riyadh and on intercity bus routes were subsequently delivered to the Saudi Public Transport Company over the course of 2023, with ten of these allocated to and specially upgraded for transporting members of the House of Saud.

==== Singapore ====
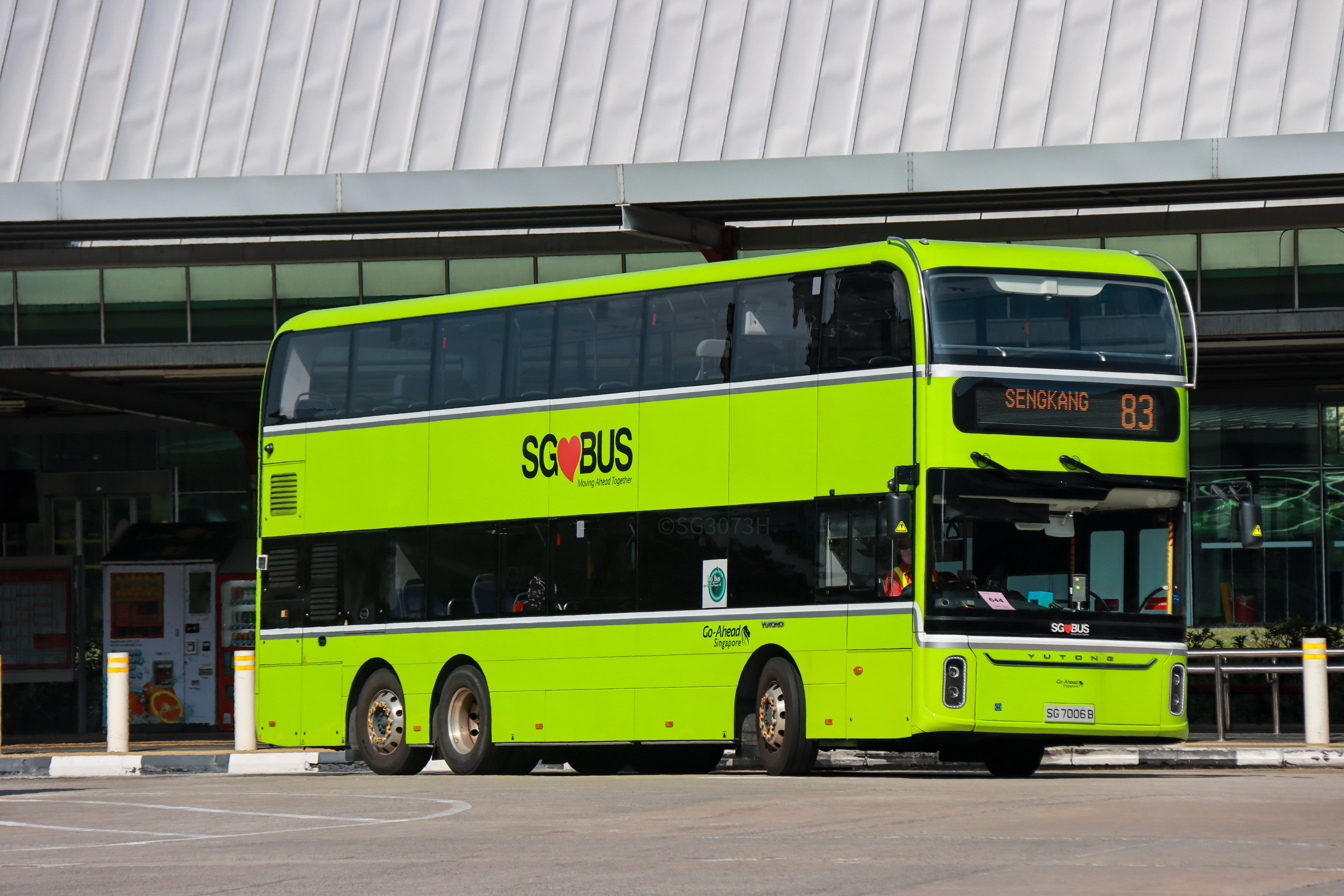
A Go-Ahead Singapore Yutong E12DD

In 2009, SMRT Buses received a Yutong ZK6126HGC diesel trial bus, marking it as the first China-made bus to be operated by a public transport operator in Singapore. Registered as SMB135E, the bus was permanently deployed on Route 854 until the end of its trial in 2010, after which no further purchases were made. Following the trial, SMB135E was deregistered, returned to the dealership, and re-registered as PH8811S under the private transport operator Bedok Transport. Bedok Transport subsequently deployed the bus on Scheme B Route 621.

In 2018, as part of a small scale purchase of 60 electric buses, the Land Transport Authority of Singapore procured ten Yutong E12 battery electric single-deck buses as well as ten Yutong E12DD electric double-deck buses. The Yutong E12s entered service with Tower Transit Singapore, Go-Ahead Singapore and SMRT Buses in April 2020, while the Yutong E12DDs later entered service in October 2020 with the same operators. In December 2024, SMRT Buses moved their Yutong E12 and E12DD units from Tower Transit's Bulim Depot to its own Woodlands Depot, and redeployed the Yutong buses to Woodlands Town routes 904, 912M and 962. In May 2025, the new generation Yutong U12DD electric bus was launched in Zhengzhou, China. In December 2025, 100 of U12 buses also awarded with Yutong International Trade Limited, known as Yutong (Contract PT602) & they entered service by 2027.

==== Qatar ====
In preparation for the 2022 FIFA World Cup held in Qatar, 888 Yutong battery electric buses, an increase from an initial order of 741 made in 2020, were delivered to state-owned bus operator Mowasalat (Karwa). Some of these buses, which operated shuttle services to and from football venues and subway stations over the course of the World Cup, were based in a 400,000 square feet (37,000 m^{2}) purpose-built bus depot in Lusail that was described as the world's largest, with space to store and charge 478 electric buses, as well as hosting 24 ancillary buildings on the site.

Yutong's involvement in the 2022 World Cup was followed by the signing of a memorandum of understanding in April 2023 between Yutong and Mowasalat, with the companies planning to co-operate on the development of electric commercial vehicles in Qatar.

==== Uzbekistan ====
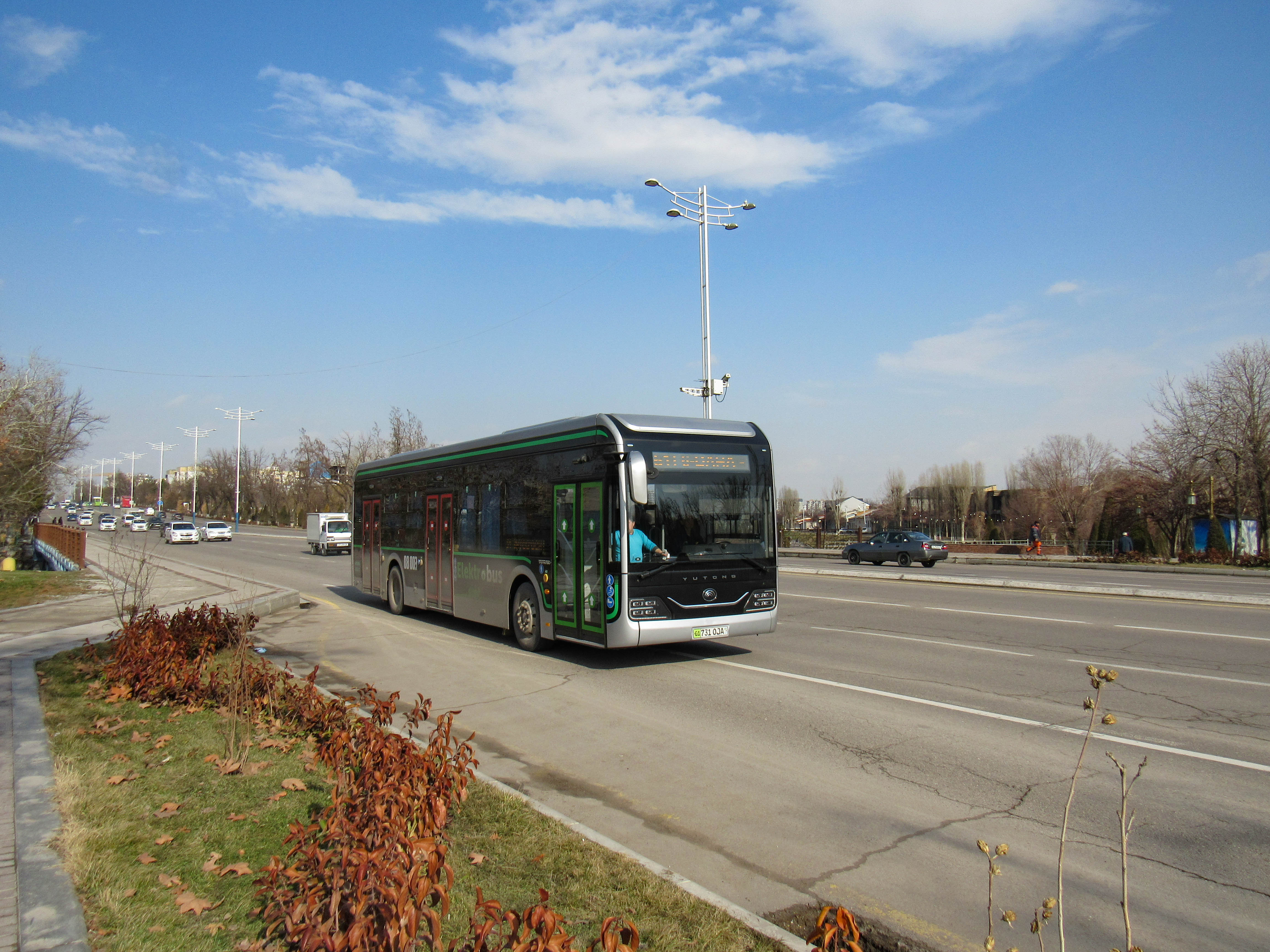
A Yutong Yuwei E12 in Tashkent

168 Yutong ZK6122H9 intercity coaches were delivered to Uzbekistan operator Uzavtoservis in 2019, with the first 100 being delivered by March and the remaining 68 delivered in April.

Twenty Yutong ZK6126BEVG battery electric single decker buses, as well as ten battery chargers, were delivered to Uzbekistan's capital Tashkent in February 2022, entering service with the city's bus operator Tosh-Shakhar-Trans-Khizmat. These were followed by 40 Yutong T7 minibuses, delivered to Samarkand in April 2022 in advance of the 2022 SCO summit, which was being held in the city.

Yutong received an order for 500 CNG buses and 300 Yuwei E12 battery electric buses for operators across Uzbekistan, the largest export order for the company to date. The first batches of buses from this order began to be delivered from early 2023.

=== Export milestones ===
In total Yutong exported more than 57,000 buses and coaches. Here are some export milestones of Yutong:

1. In 2009, Yutong exported 175 ZK6118HGA city buses to Kuwait.
2. In 2010, Yutong signed an agreement of 202 double-decker buses with the Macedonian government in Skopje.
3. In 2010, Yutong signed a 490-unit order with Ghana, following the 250-unit order signed with Ghana in 2008.
4. In 2011, Yutong signed a 1,216-unit procurement contract with the Venezuelan Ministry of Transport to help them establish and complete the first BRT system in Venezuela.
5. In 2012, Yutong signed an SKD order of over 100 units with Ethiopia, and in 2014, Yutong signed a CKD order of over 200 units with Ethiopia again.
6. In 2012, a Yutong tourist coach has entered the Israeli market for the first time.
7. In 2013, Yutong delivered 300 LNG city buses to Peru.
8. In 2013, Yutong signed a 160-unit order with the Philippines.
9. In 2013, Yutong delivered over 300 buses to Israel, which hit a record high in the bus import history of the country.
10. In 2014, Yutong got a 1,500-unit bus order from Venezuela.
11. In 2015, Yutong signed a KD contract of 2,300 buses with Venezuela.
12. In 2015, Yutong was invited to attend the 23rd annual conference of FNTV. In addition, Yutong was also involved in the “BUS 2025” program of RATP and provided a full electric bus for trial operation, which was also showcased at the UN Climate Change Conference.
13. In 2016, Yutong signed the Cooperative Framework Agreement on Cuban Public Transport Improvement & Bus Capacity Enhancement Program.
14. In 2016, Yutong successfully delivered 110 buses to Bulgaria.
15. By the end of 2017, Yutong totally delivered more than 3,000 buses and coaches to France, UK, Israel and other countries that applied European standards.
16. In 2017, 500 units of Yutong natural gas city buses were delivered to Yangon, the largest city of Myanmar.
17. In 2022, Yutong delivered 183 electric buses to Colombia, to be used for public transportation in the city of Bogotá.
18. In 2023, Yutong agreed to supply the Yerevan trolleybus system in Armenia with 15 new trolleybus vehicles.
19. In 2024, Yutong delivered 250 electric buses to Greece (Model E12), to be used for public transportation of Athens (140 buses) and Thessaloniki (110 buses); in 2025, an agreement was made for the delivery of another 125 buses to the country.

=== Gallery ===
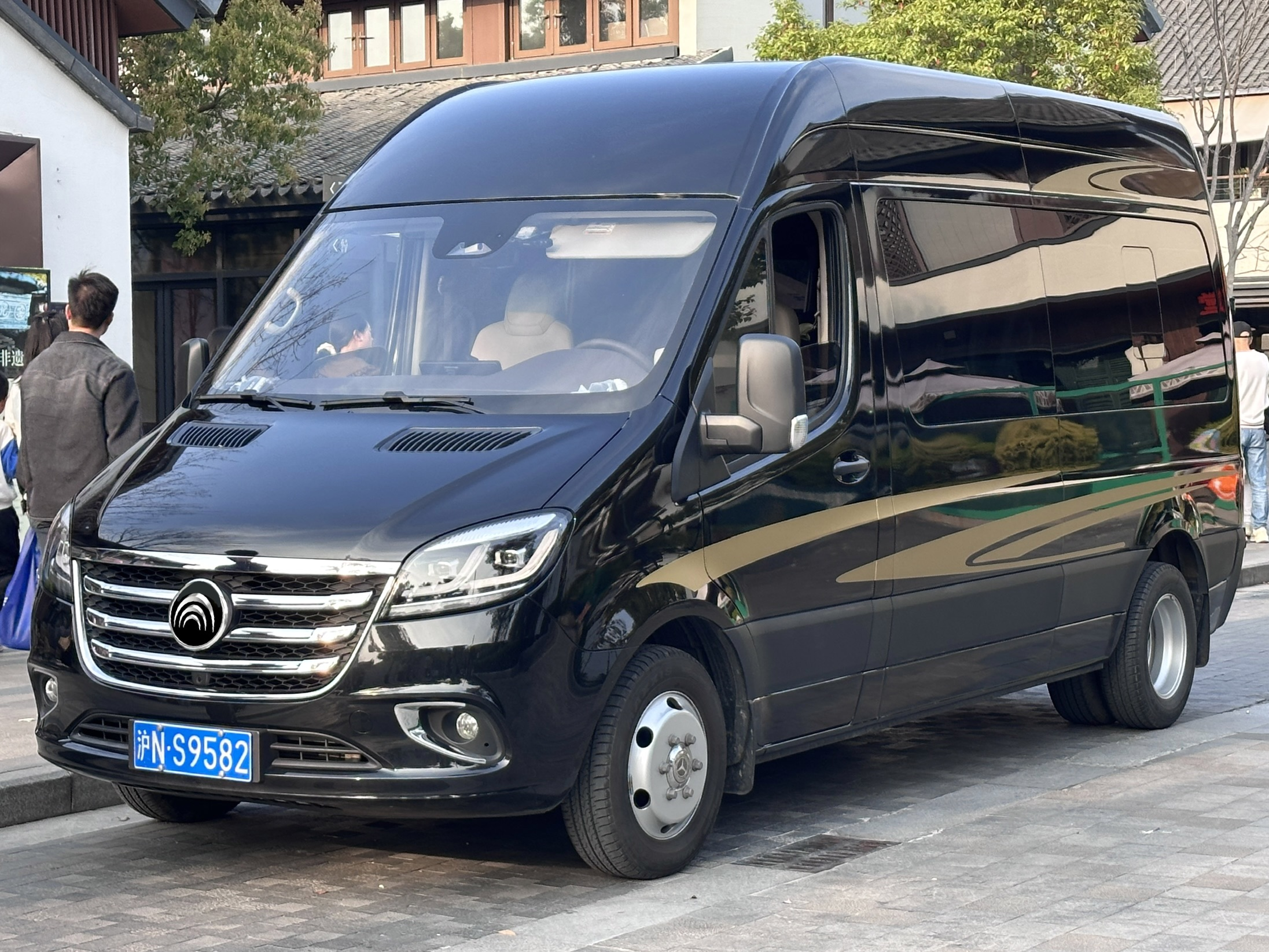
Yutong Tianjun V6 van in Shanghai

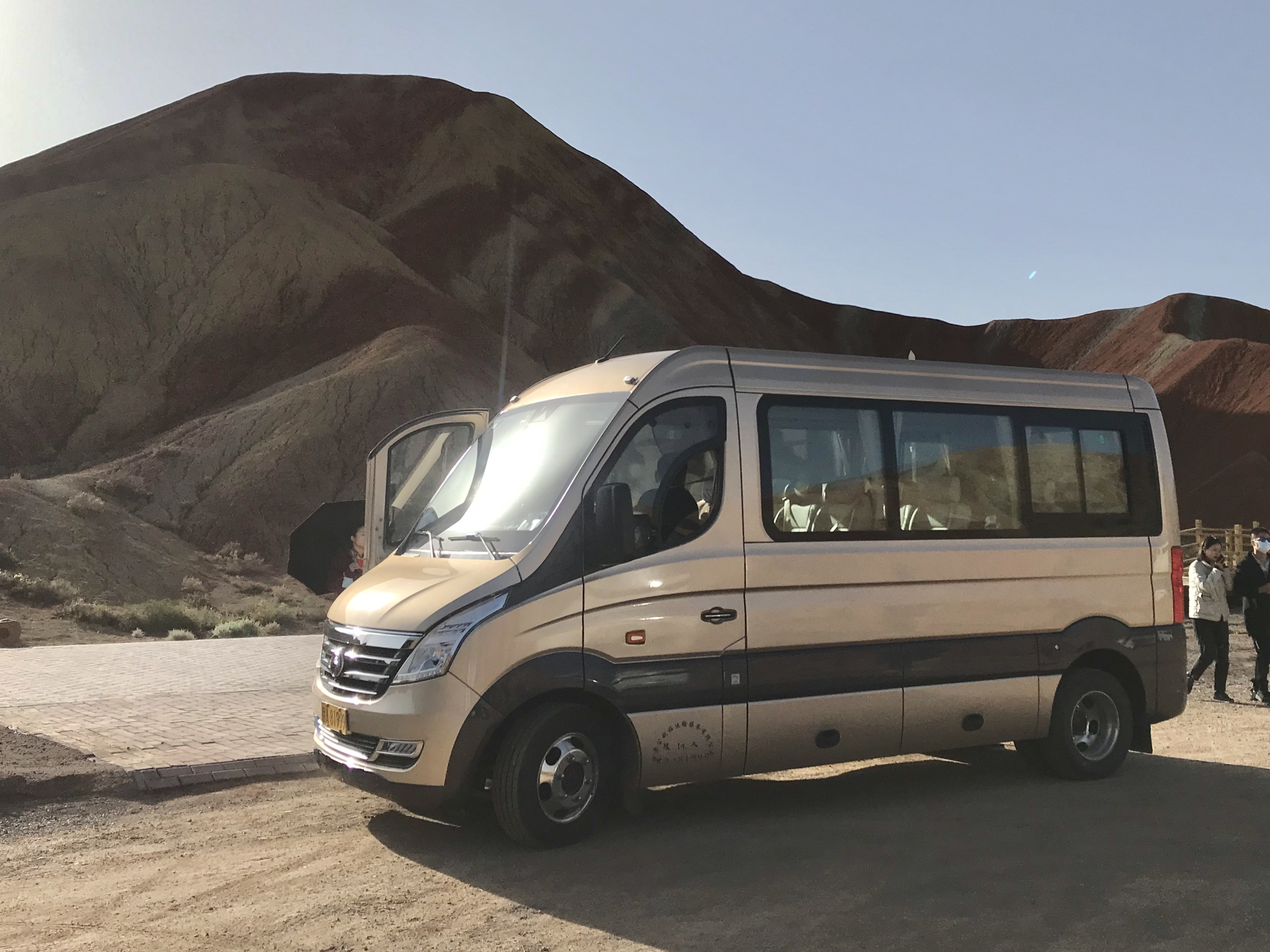
Yutong CL6 coach in Gansu

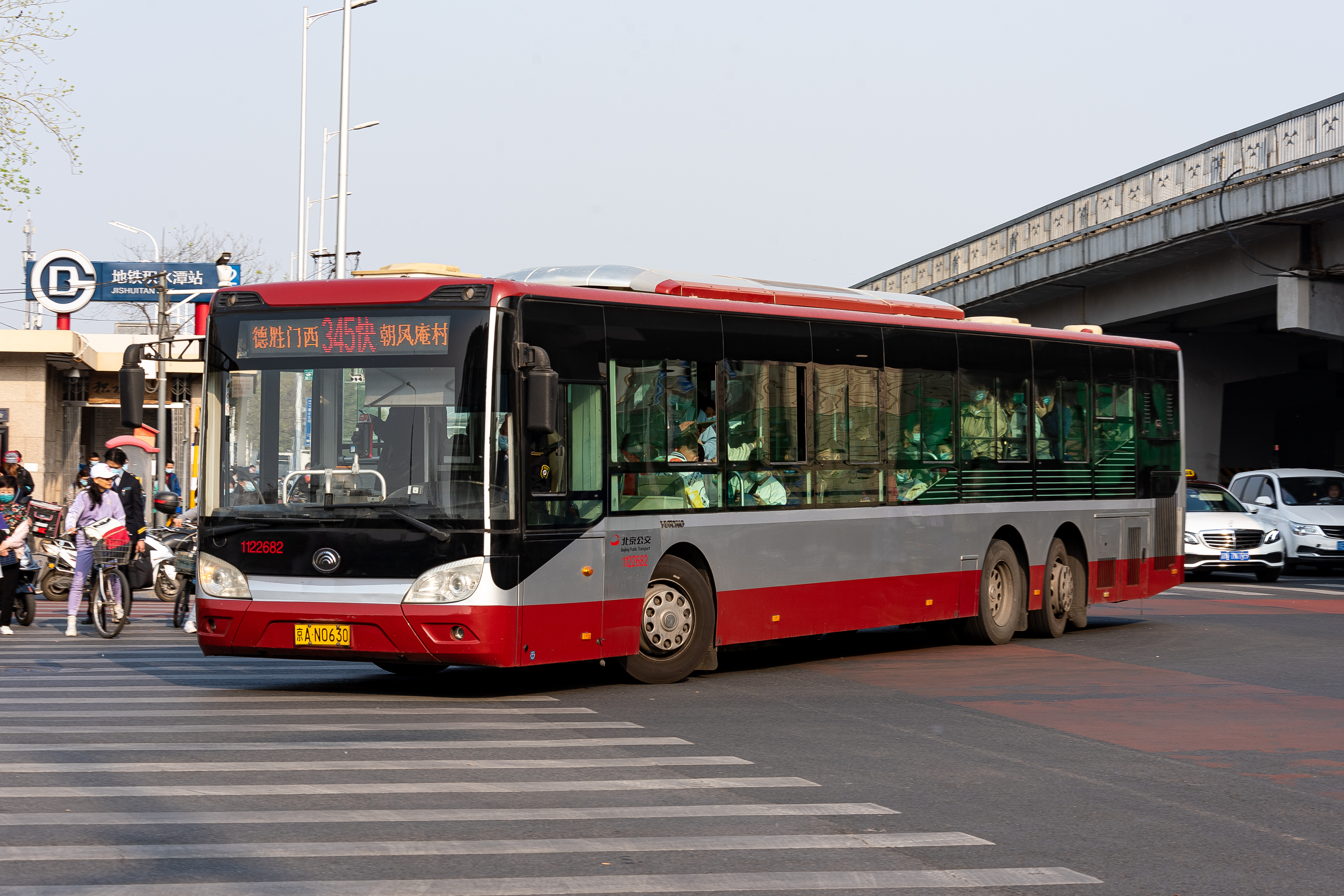
Yutong ZK6140HNG2 on Beijing Bus service

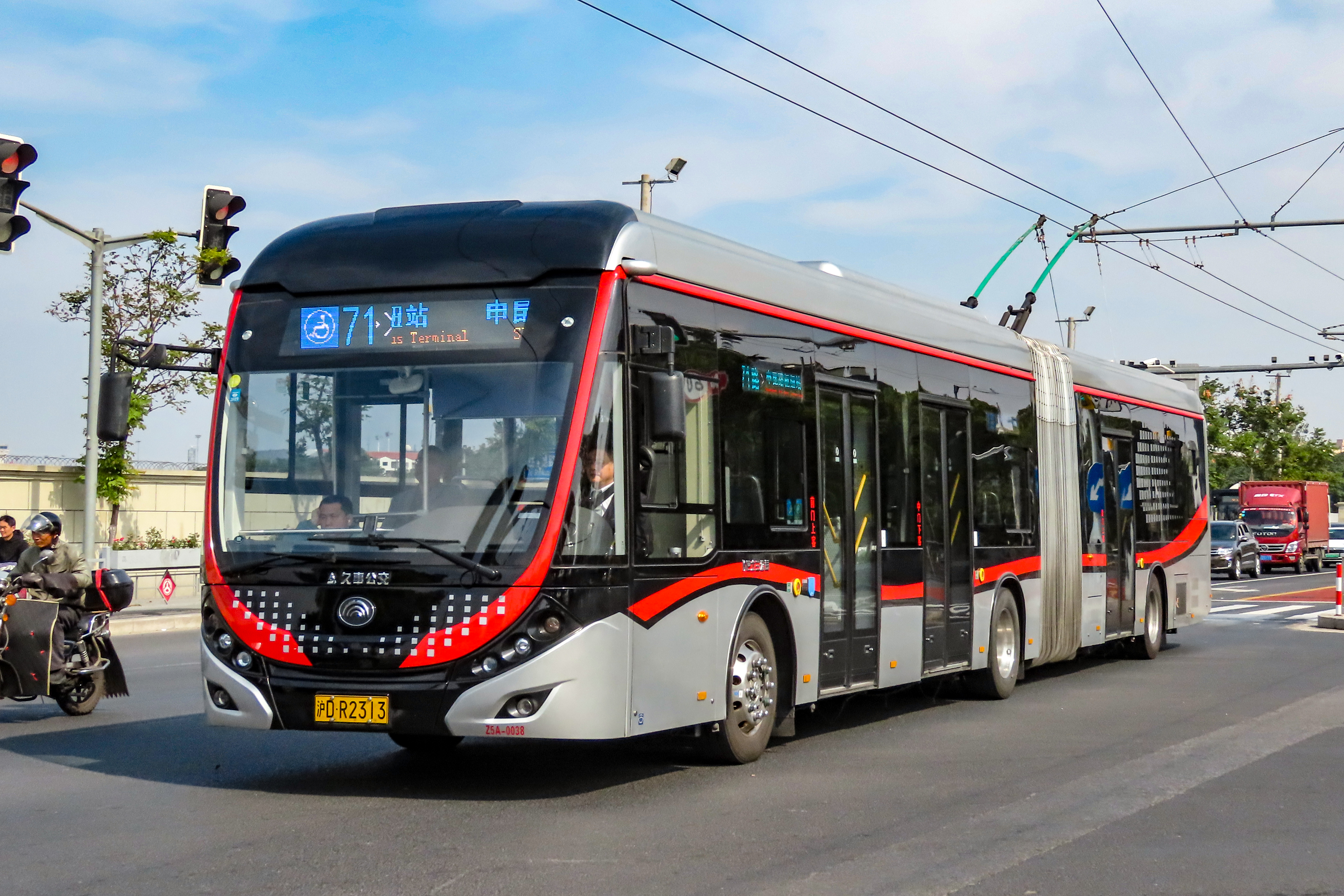
Yutong ZK5180A trolleybus in Shanghai, China

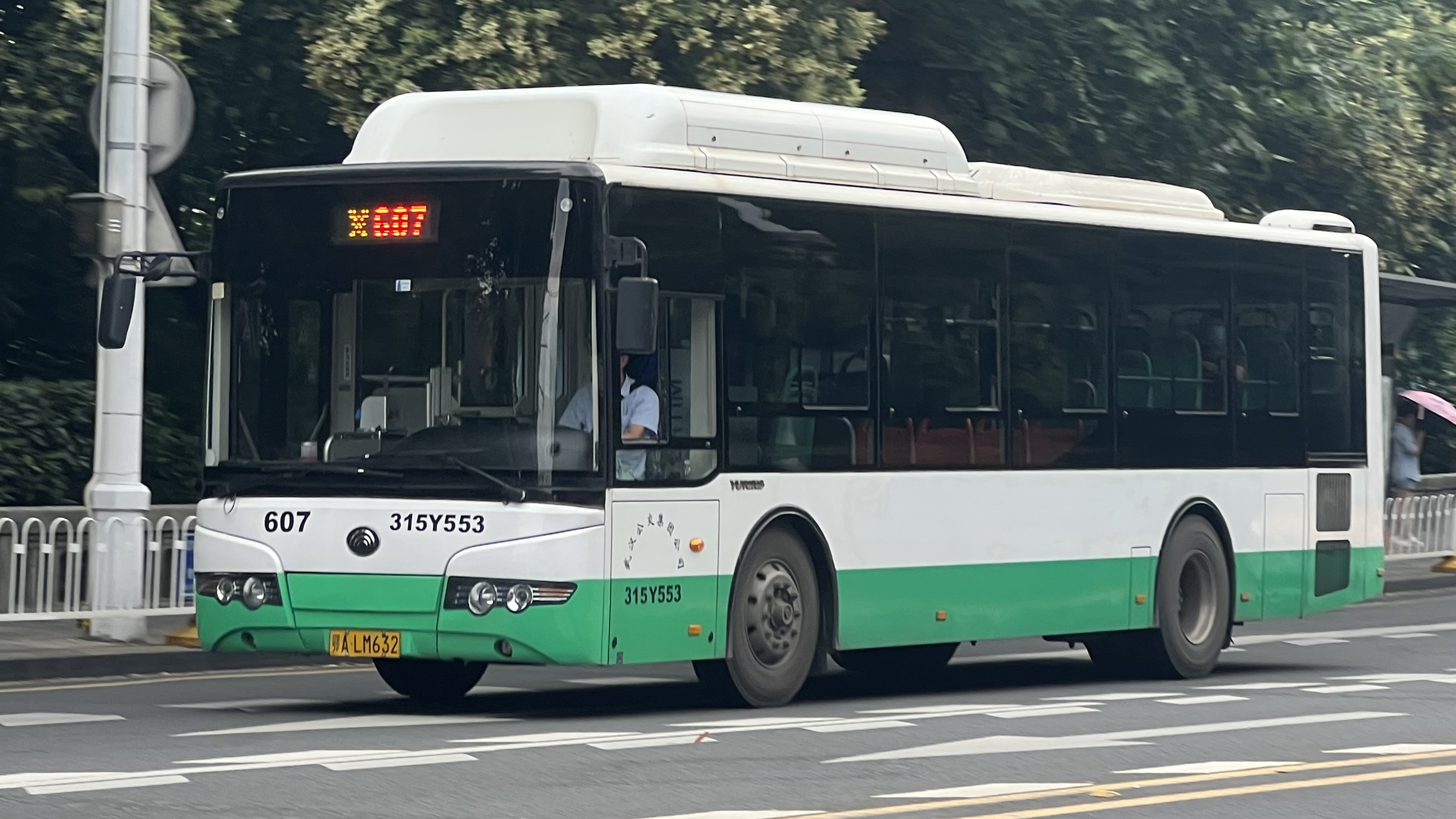
Yutong ZK6105HNG2 in Wuhan, China

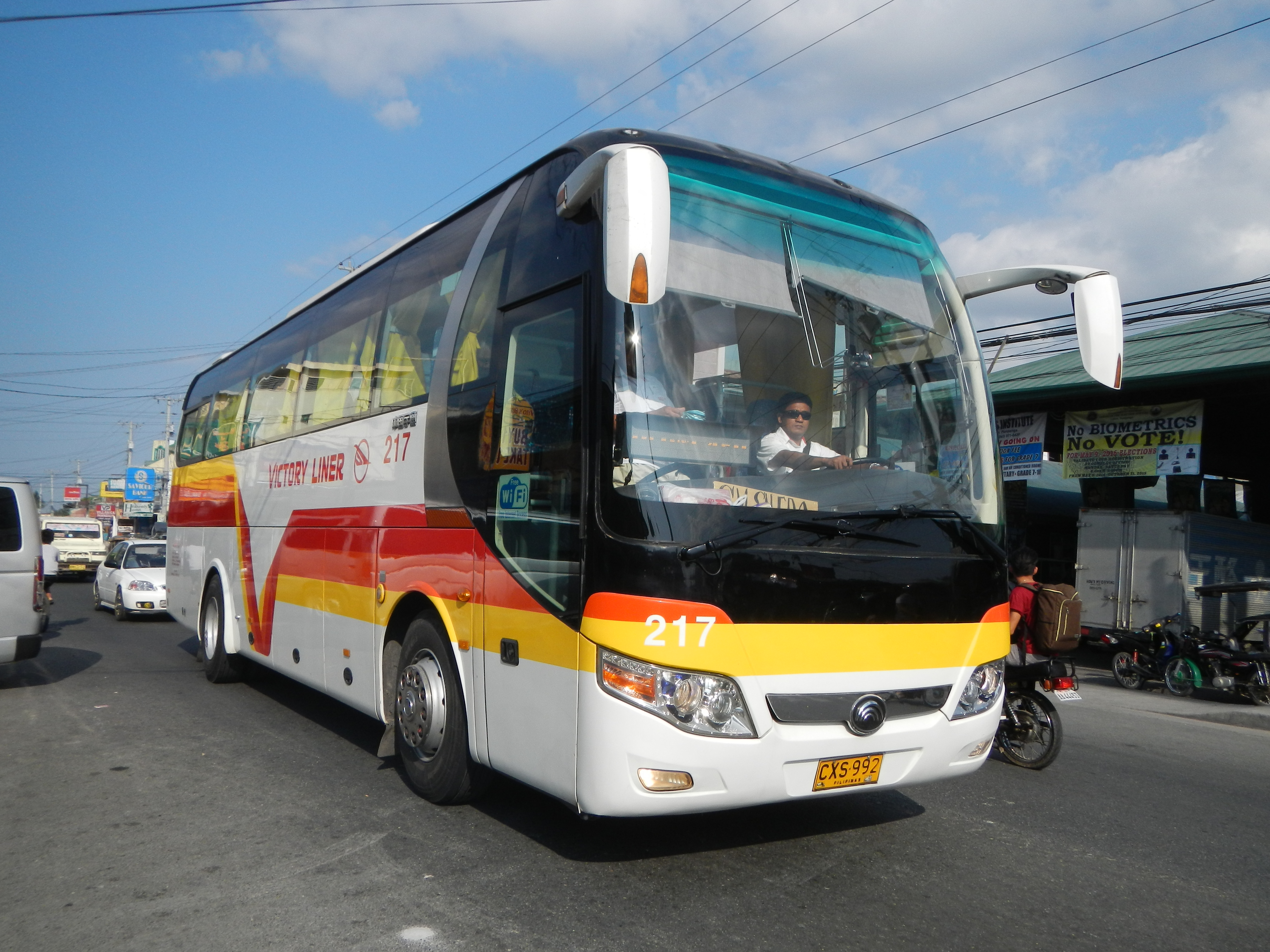
Yutong Bus in Pampanga, Philippines

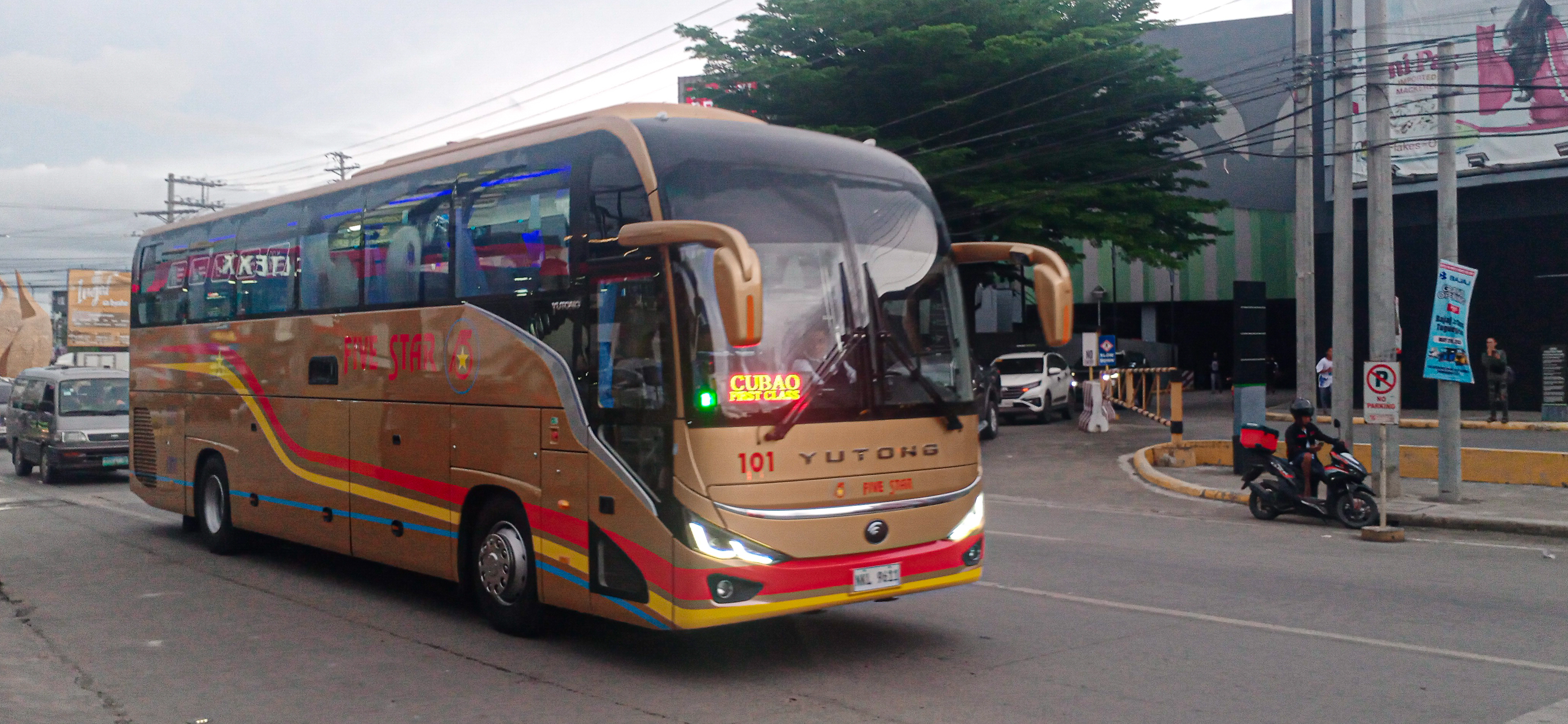
Yutong ZK6128H in Tuguegarao City, Philippines

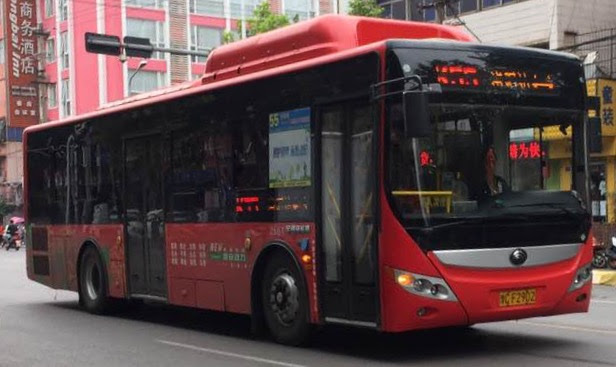
Yutong ZK6105C in Luoyang, China

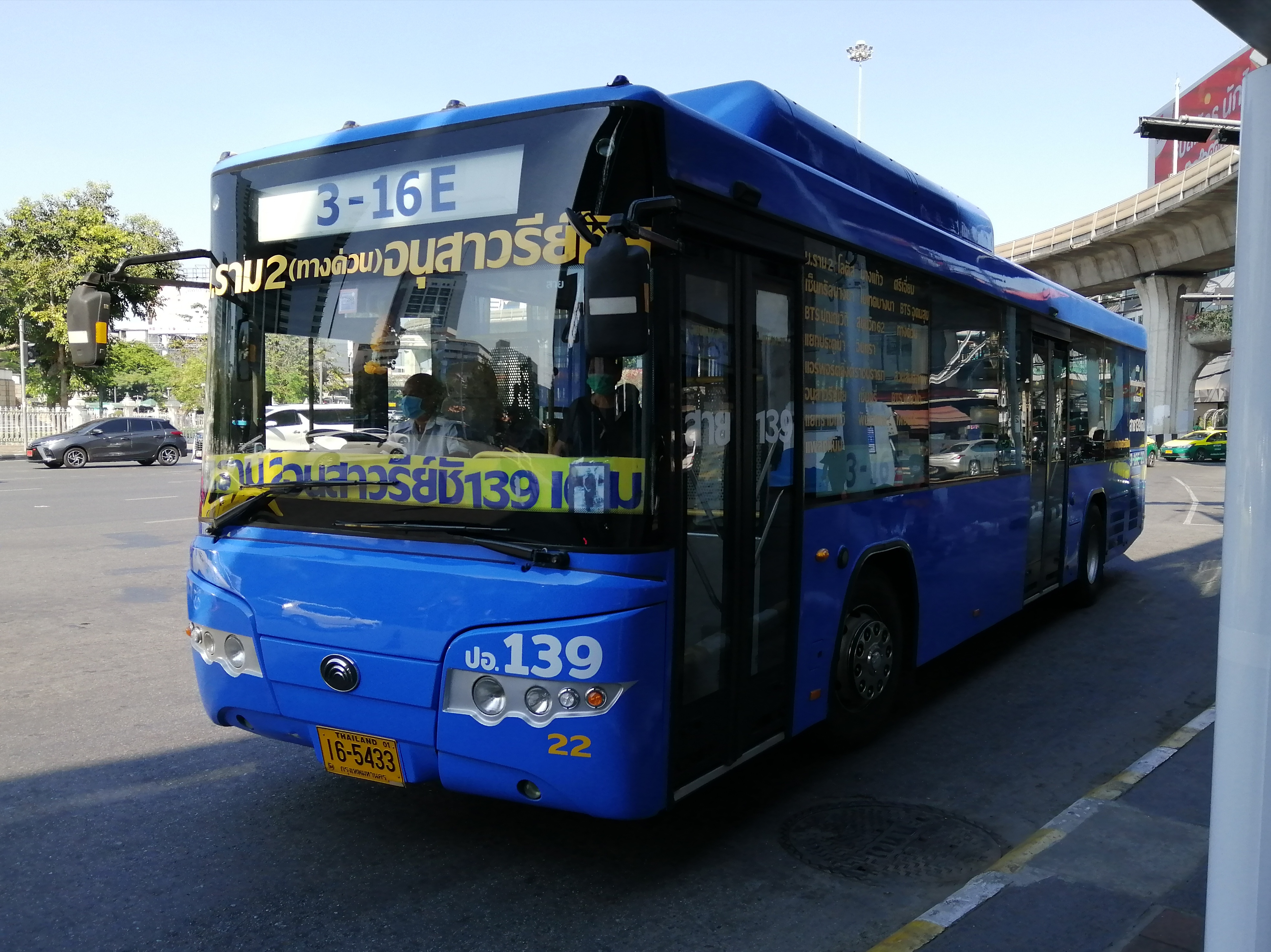
Yutong ZK6118HGK in Thailand (Phaisarn Samakkee Khonsong CO., LTD.)

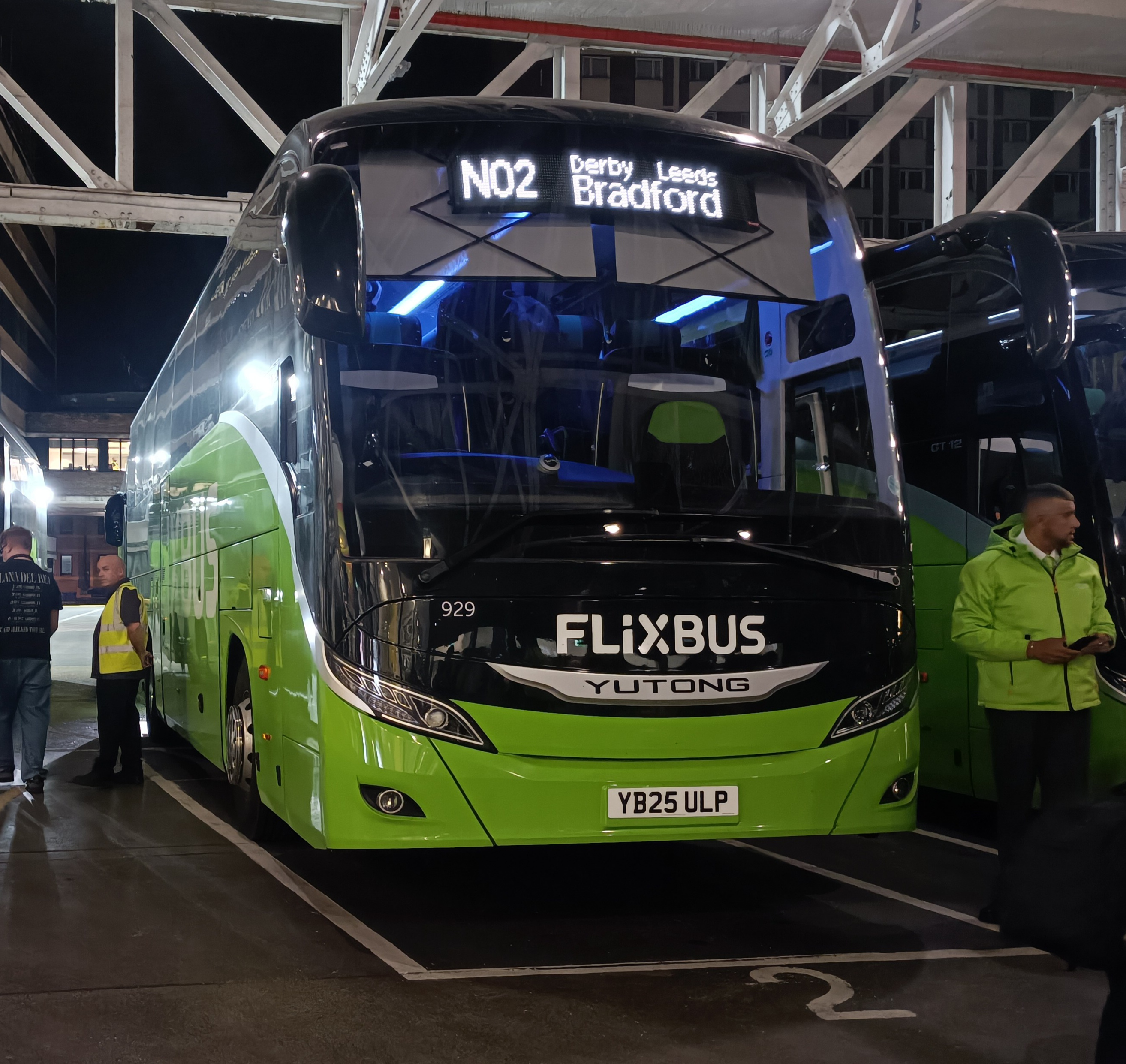
Yutong GT12 in the United Kingdom

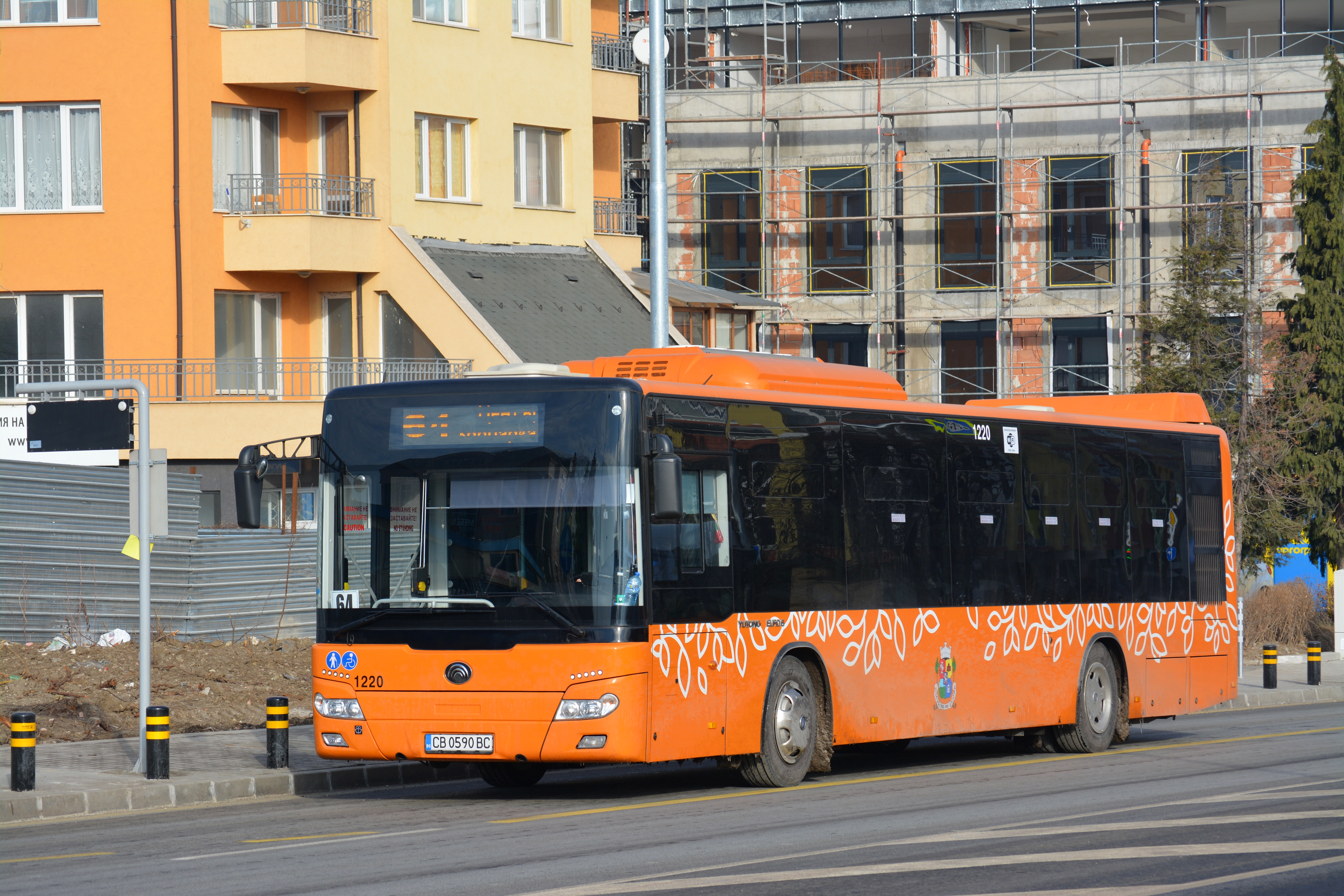
Yutong ZK6126HGA in Sofia, Bulgaria.

Yutong bus in Efkarpia, Thessaloniki

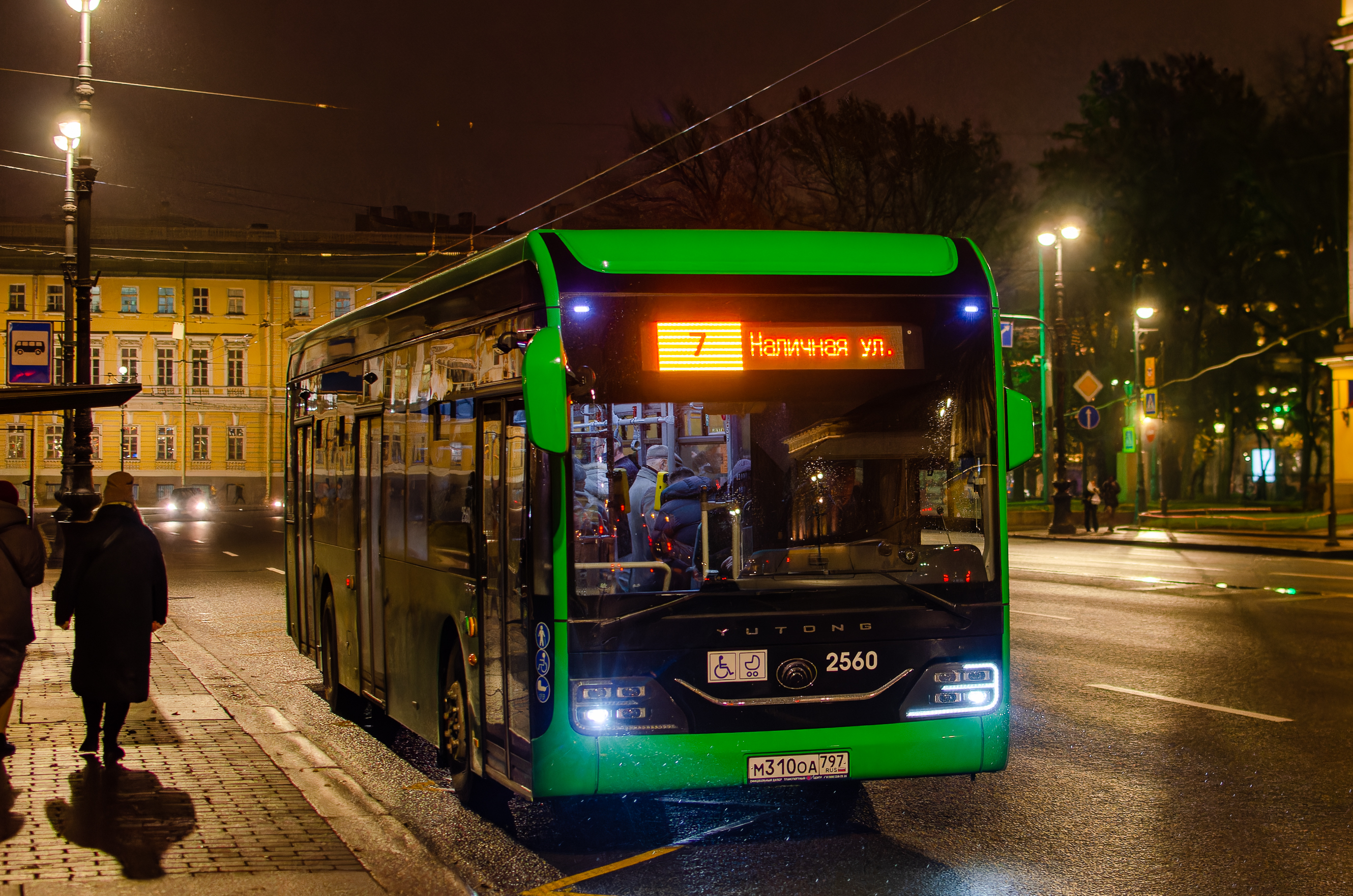
Yutong U12 in Saint Petersburg, Russia

Yutong E10 in Mrągowo, Poland

Trolleybus Yutong U12T in Arnhem, Netherlands

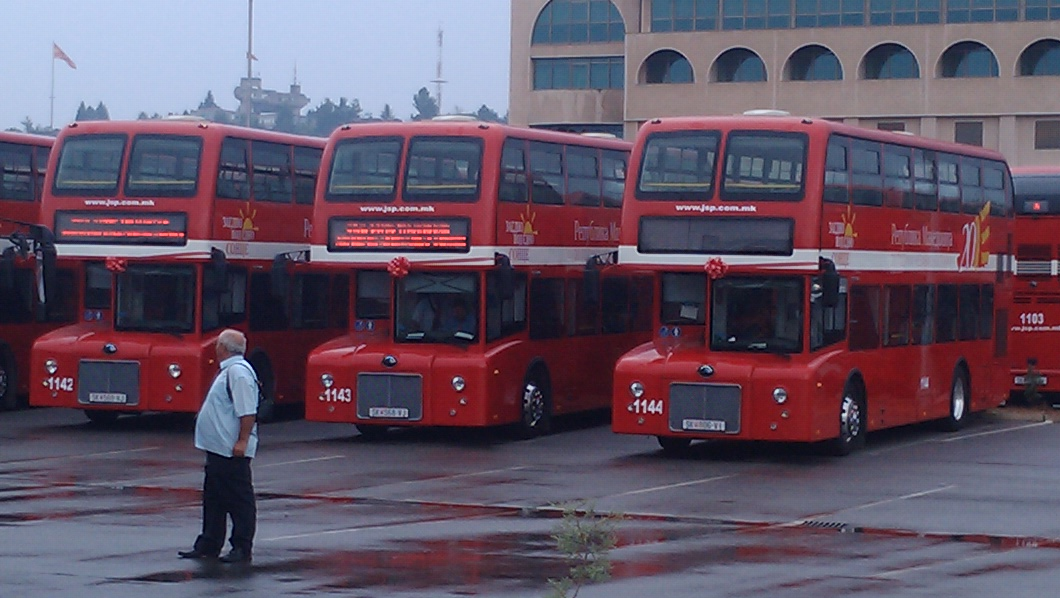
Yutong City Master buses in Skopje, North Macedonia

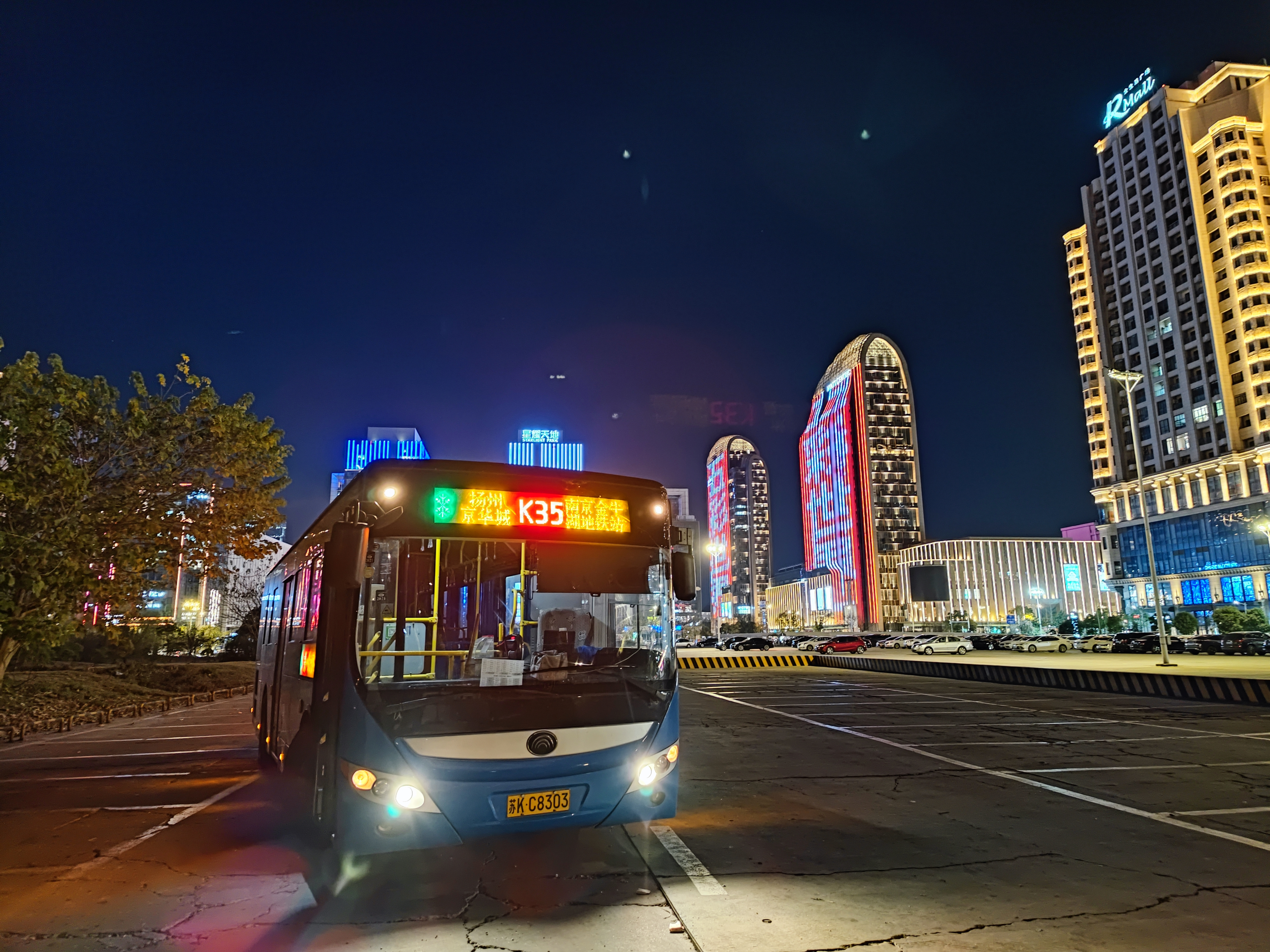
Yutong H10 with lights on at night

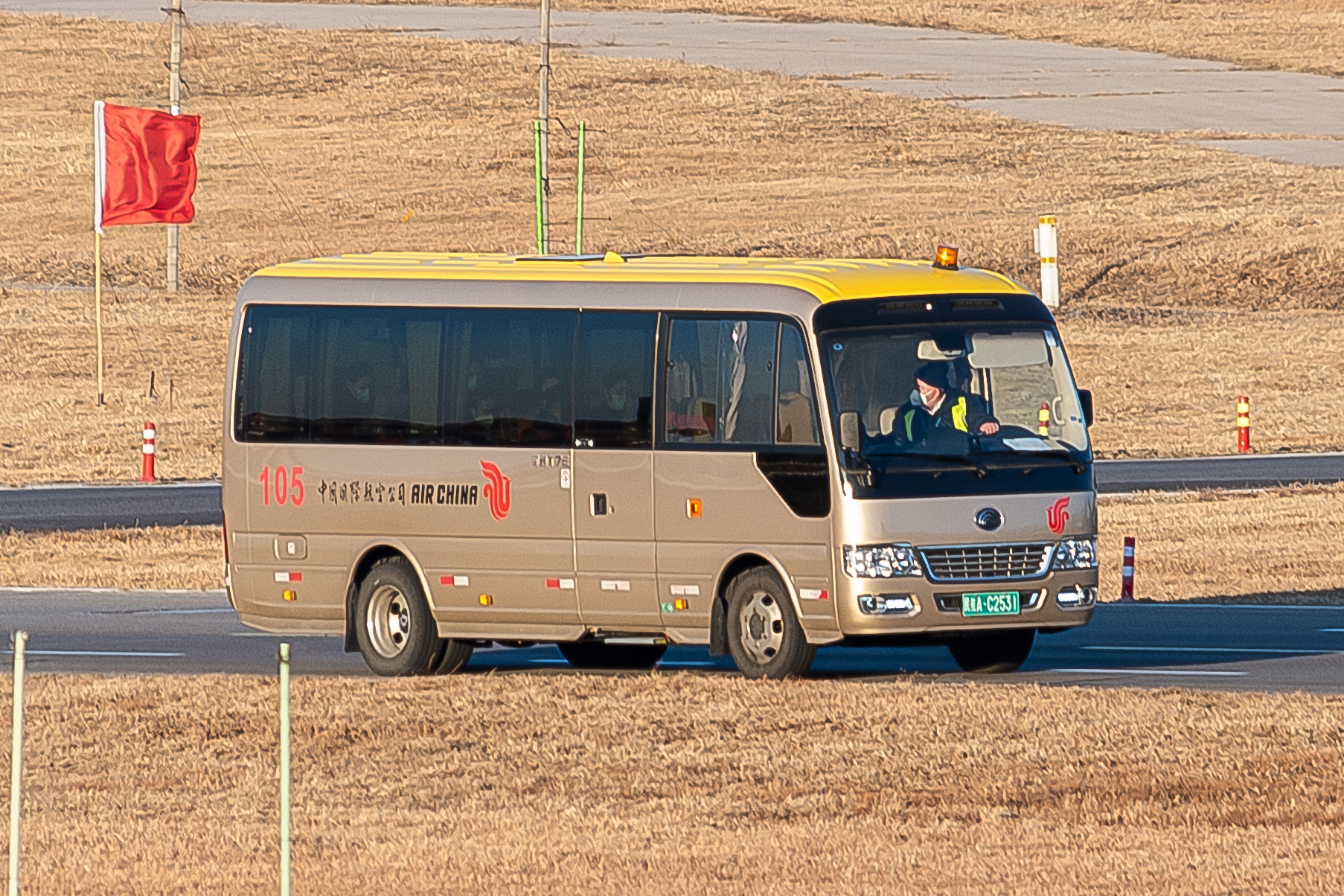
Airport shuttle bus.

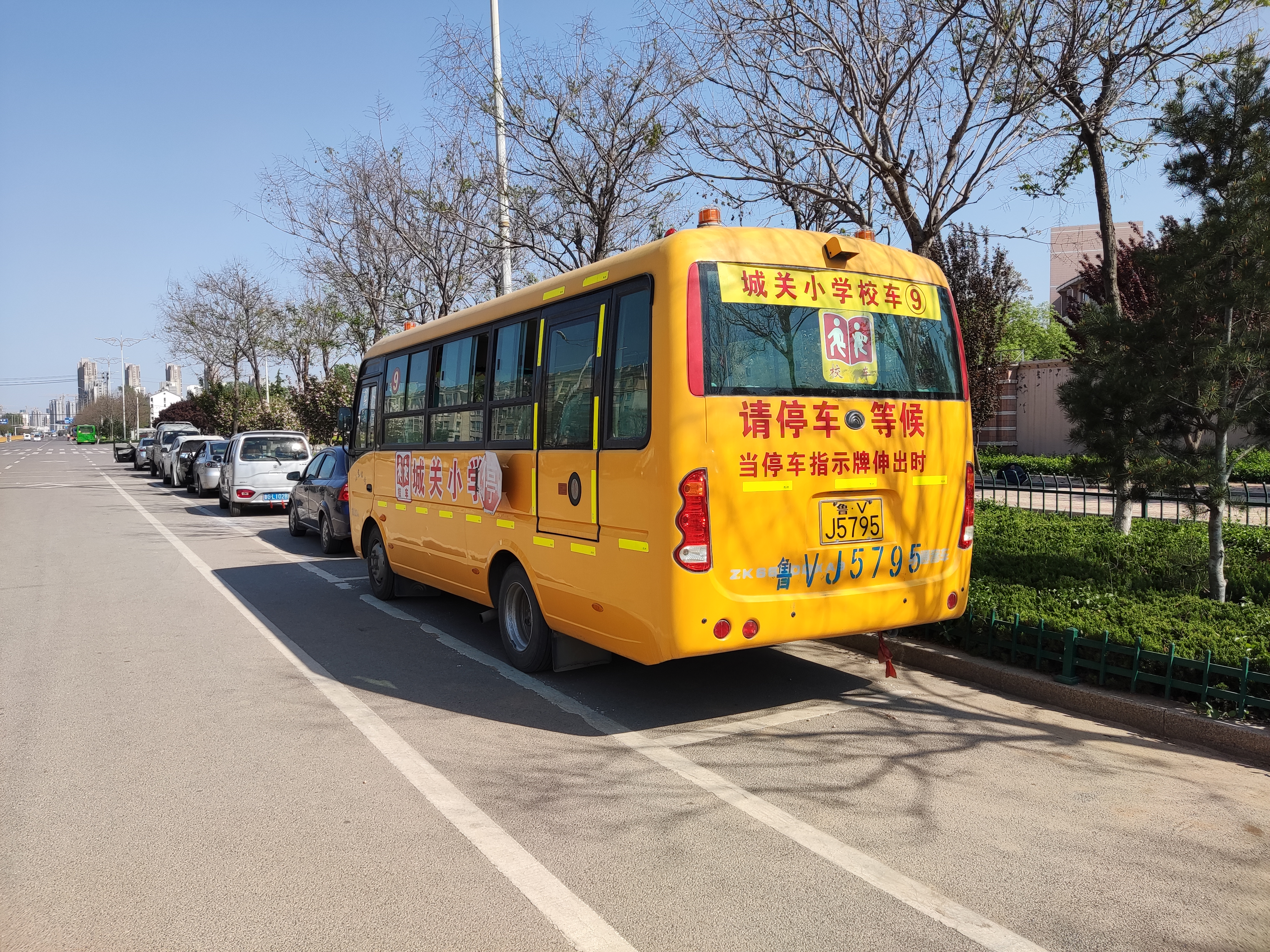
School bus

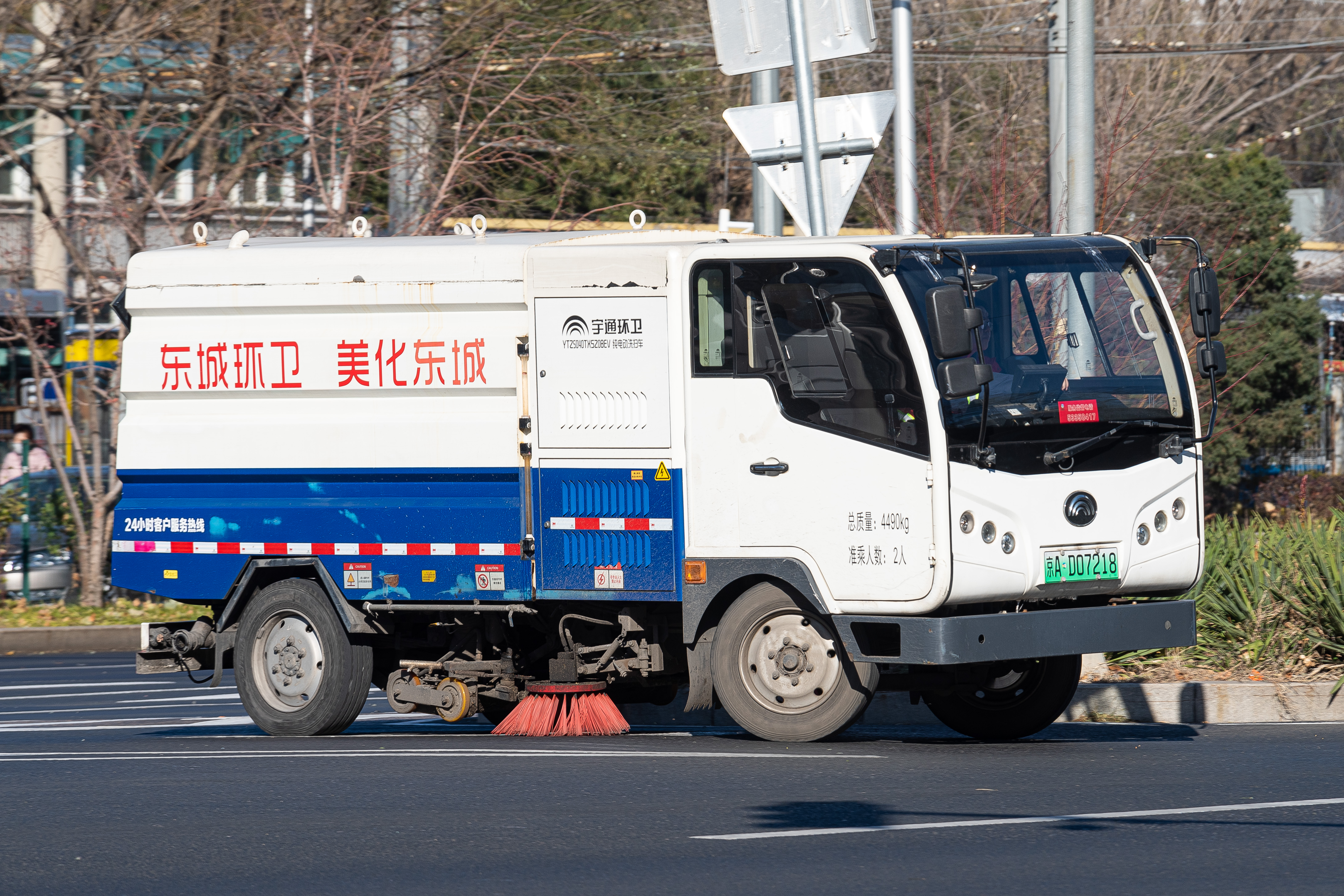
Street sweeper truck.

== Yutong Heavy Industries ==
Another core part of the Yutong Group is Yutong Heavy Industries, a manufacturer of construction equipment formed in 2003, and with about 3,500 employees and more than 120 products.

=== Products ===
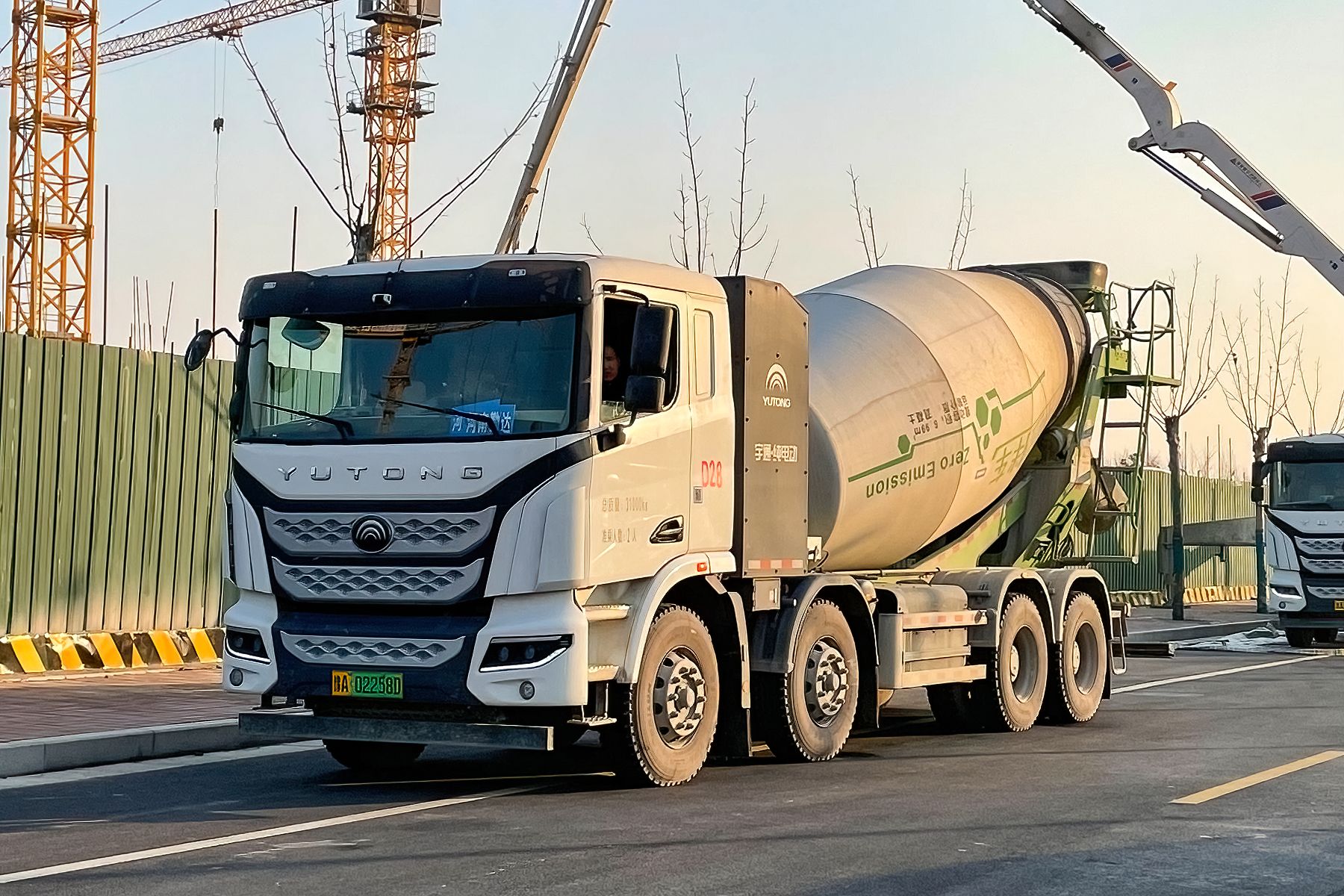
Battery-powered cement mixer truck, one of the specialty vehicles by Yutong Heavy Industries.

- Yutong YT3621 Mining Dump Truck
- Yutong YT3761 Mining Dump Truck
- Yutong 952A wheeled loader
- Yutong 966H wheeled loader
- Yutong TL210H earth mover
- Yutong 988H wheeled loader
- Yutong 956H wheeled loader
- Yutong YTQH300 hydraulic crane
- Yutong 6830 compactor
- Yutong YTQH400A hydraulic crane
- Yutong YTQU50 crane
- Yutong WZ30-25 backhoe
- Yutong WZ30-25G backhoe
- Yutong WZ30-25H backhoe

== See also ==
- List of automobile manufacturers of China
- Electric vehicle industry in China
- List of buses
