= Yutong City Master =

Chinese low-floor double-decker bus

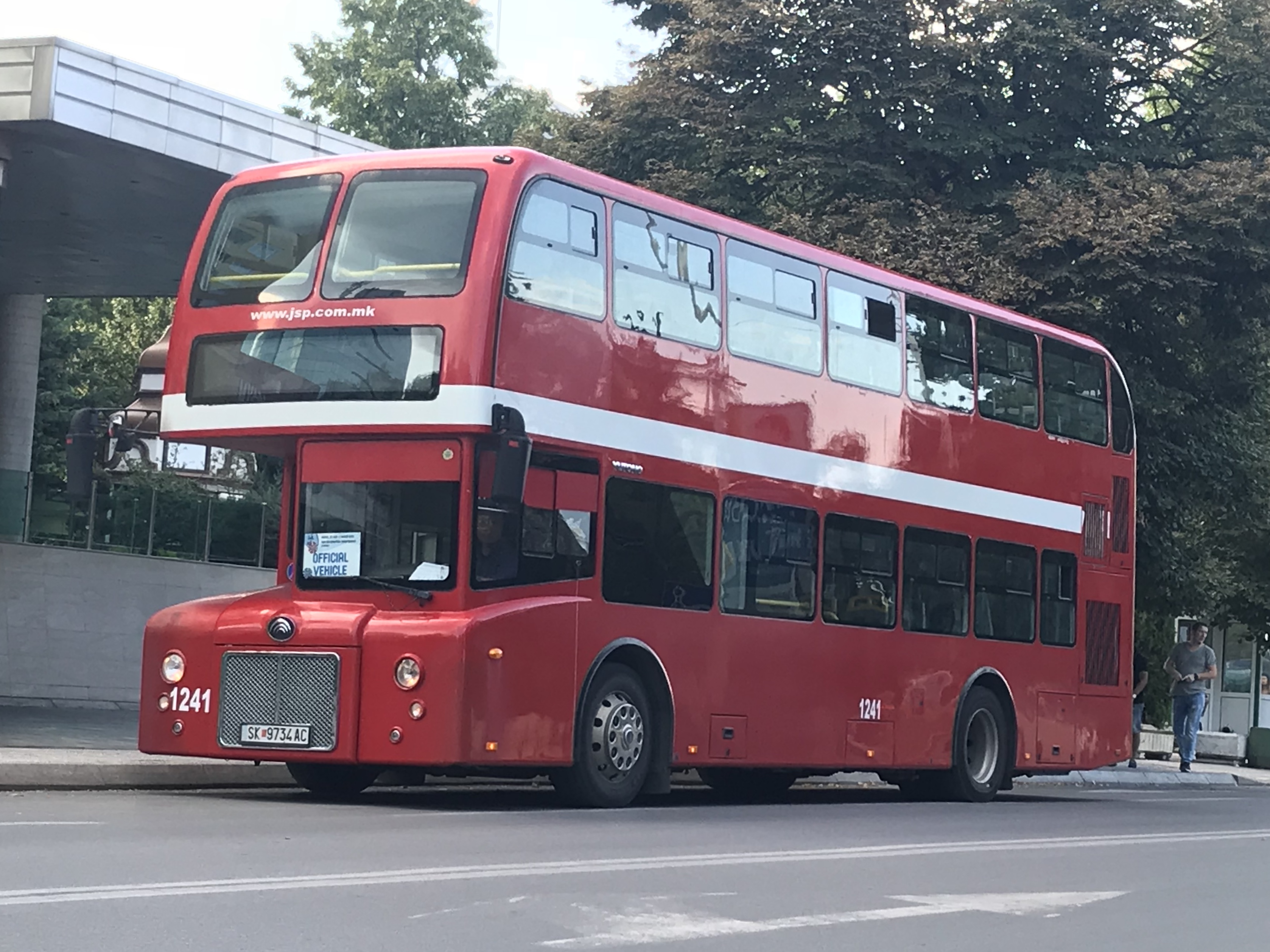
- Yutong City Master in Skopje, North Macedonia

Overview
- Manufacturer: Yutong
- Production: 2010–present
- Assembly: Zhengzhou, China

Body and chassis
- Class: Complete bus
- Body style: Double-decker city bus Double-decker open-top bus
- Doors: 1 or 2
- Floor type: Low floor
- Related: AEC Routemaster

Dimensions
- Length: 10.6 m (34 ft 9 in)
- Width: 2.5 m (8 ft 2 in)
- Height: 4.2 m (13 ft 9 in)

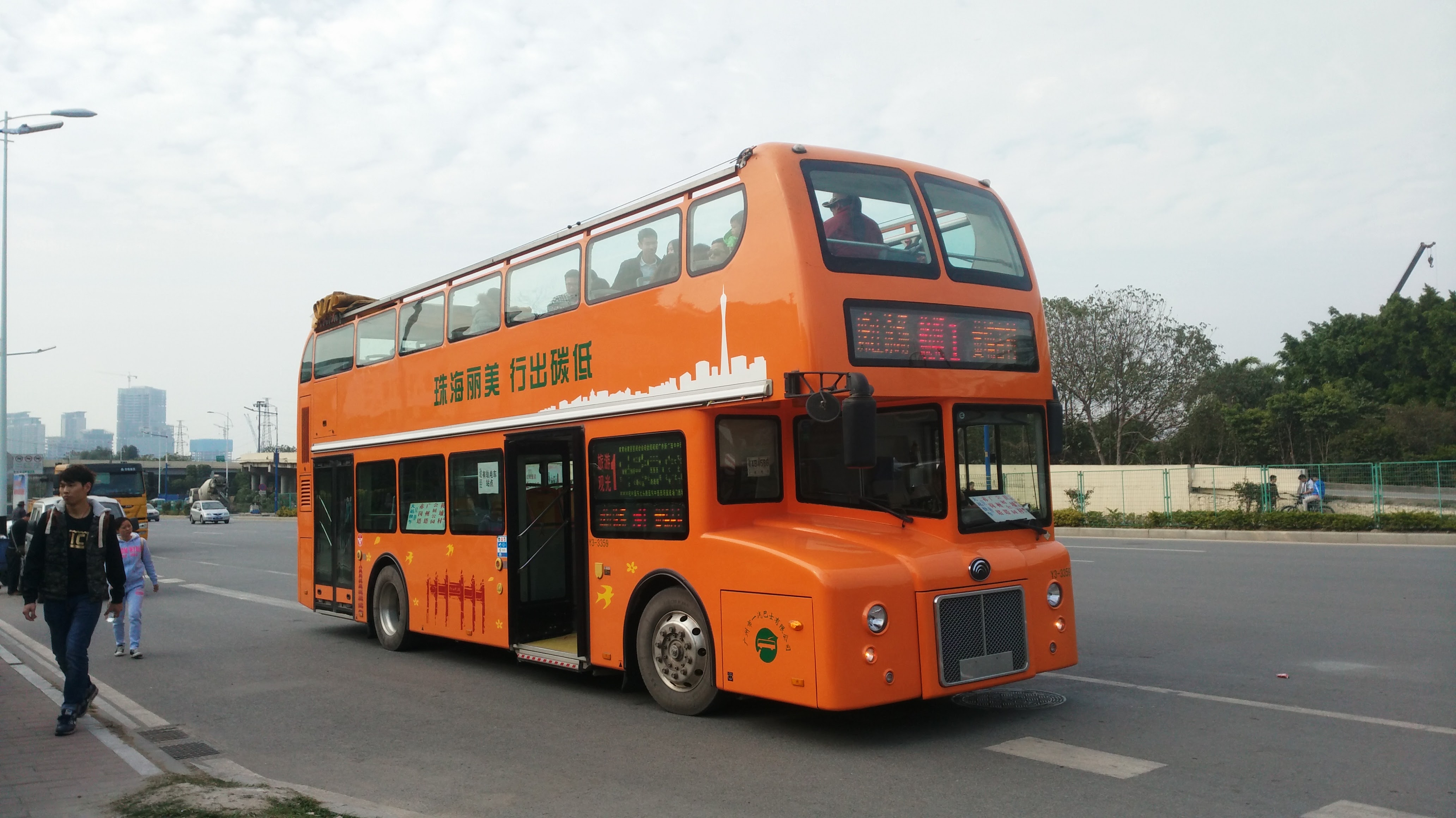
A Yutong City Master open-top bus operating in Guangzhou, China

The Yutong City Master is a low-floor double-decker bus that was first designed for JSP Skopje, the public company which has operated bus services in Skopje since 1948. The bus is designed in a "retro" style reminiscent of London Transport's AEC Routemaster. A total of 217 City Masters, including 15 open-top buses, were built for use in Skopje.

On 14 April 2010, the government of the Republic of Macedonia ordered 202 double-decker buses from the Chinese manufacturer Yutong, totalling €35.5 million.

The first 68 City Masters were put into service in Skopje on 6 September 2011. The total number of the buses increased to 217, including 15 open-top buses with removable roofs for city sightseeing services. The cost of the project was over €41 million, which was paid by the Macedonian government.

Some City Masters were also built for service in Chinese cities, including Guangzhou and Jiangmen.

They were also exported to Chile around 2012

== Design ==
The buses are designed in a "retro" style, similar to Leyland Titans, the former London double-decker buses previously used in Skopje. Hundreds of London buses were purchased by the Yugoslavian government in the 1950s and used in Skopje until the 1963 Skopje earthquake in which 80% of the city's infrastructure was destroyed.

The prototype bus appeared on the streets of Skopje on 1 March 2011.

The buses are powered by an American Cummins diesel engine manufactured in the UK, with high quality ECO 5. The bodywork is made in Germany, with only the chassis made in China.

== See also ==
- New Routemaster - TFL's flagship bus for Central London.
