= Yutong Tianjun =

Series of light commercial vehicle

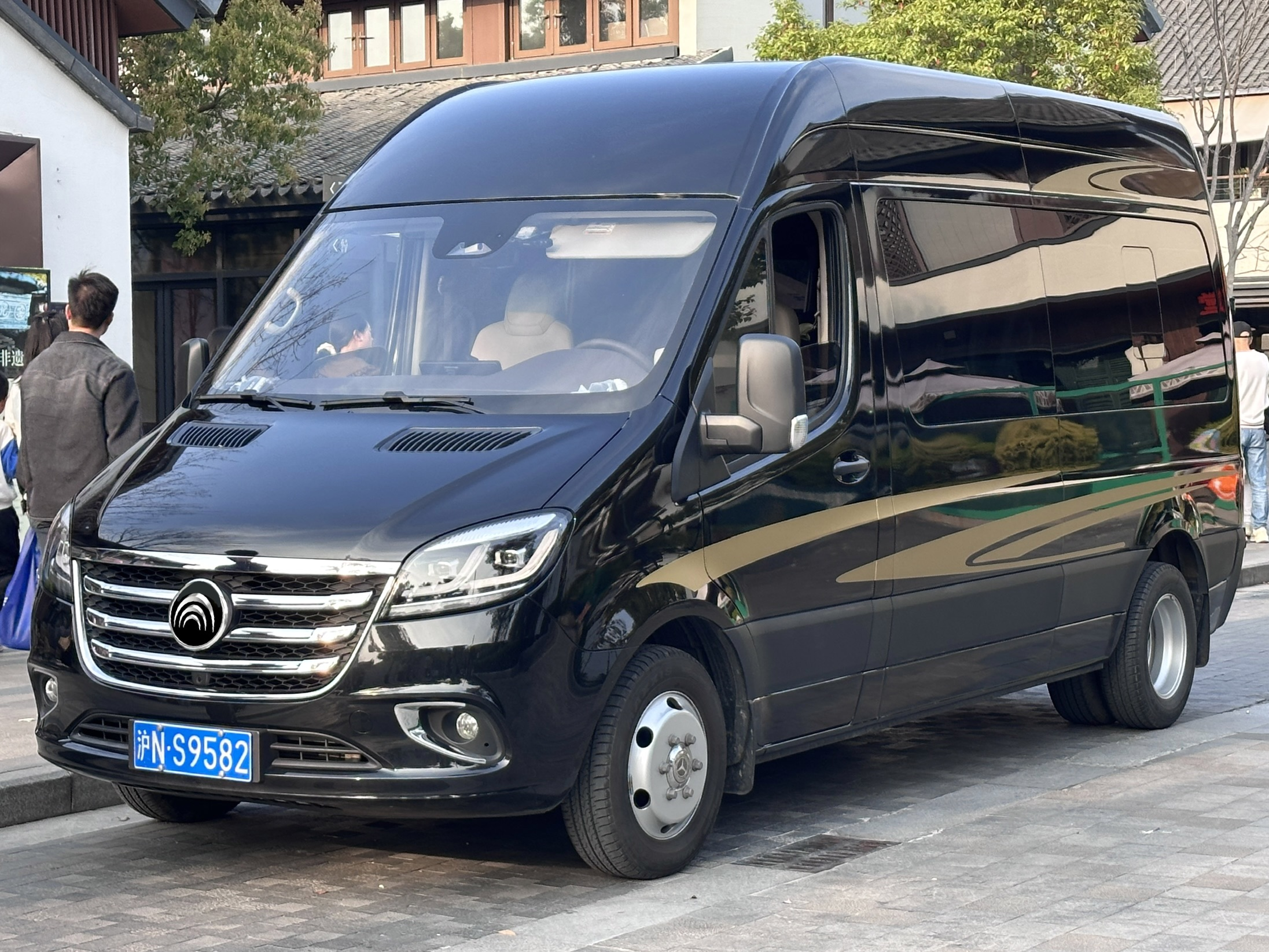

Overview
- Manufacturer: Yutong
- Also called: Foton V6E (battery electric variant); Foton V6 (export); Foton Van 6 (export)
- Production: 2024–present
- Assembly: China

Body and chassis
- Class: Light commercial vehicle
- Body style: 3-door van
- Layout: ICE: Front-engine, rear-wheel-drive; EV: Rear-motor, rear-wheel-drive

Powertrain
- Engine: Diesel: 2.3 L Futian 4J25TC3 turbo I4; 2.8 L Cummins ISF turbo I4
- Power output: 163 PS (161 hp; 120 kW) (2.3 Turbodiesel)
- Transmission: 9-speed automatic; 6-speed manual
- Range: Maximum 500 km (EV)

Dimensions
- Wheelbase: 3,350–3,850 mm (131.9–151.6 in)
- Length: 5,490–5,990 mm (216.1–235.8 in)
- Width: 2,090 mm (82.3 in)
- Height: 2,550–2,650 mm (100.4–104.3 in)

The Yutong Tianjun (Chinese: 宇通天骏) is a series of light commercial vehicle produced by Yutong since 2024.

== Overview ==
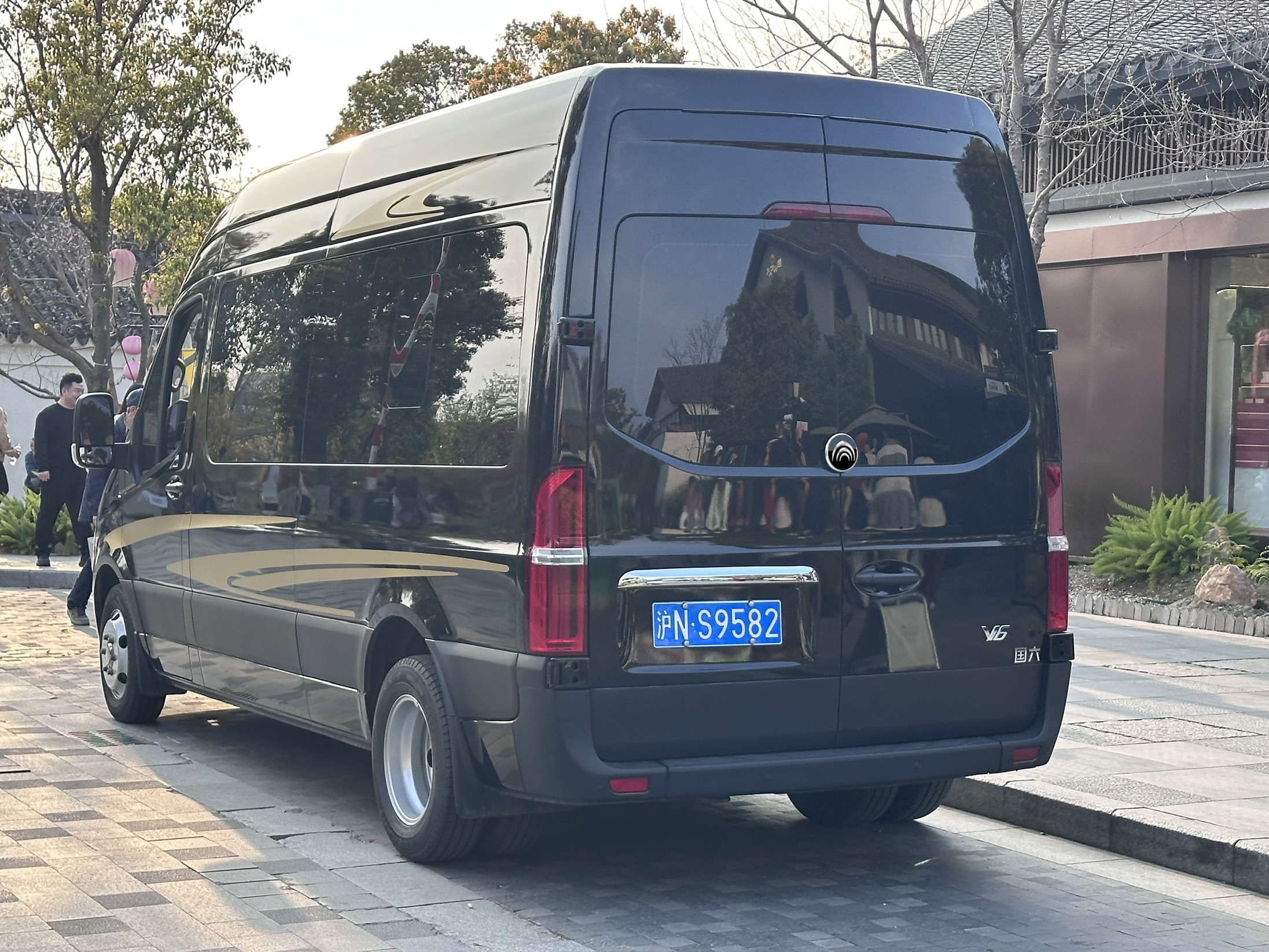
Rear view

The original was available as both the shorter Tianjun V5 variant and the longer Tianjun V6 variant. The Tianjun V5 was discontinued after the 2025 model year. For export markets, the van is simply called the Yutong V6.

The Tianjun V6 is equipped with a 2.3 liter M9T-602 turbo diesel engine, which generates 120 kW (163 PS) and 400 N⋅m (295 lb⋅ft) of torque. Fuel consumption of the Tianjun V6 is 9.2L/100km. Dual rear tires and Bosch's Electronic Stability Program (ESP) is standard across the range. It can accommodate up to 15 passengers with a high ceiling, making it possible to stand up inside the vehicle.

== Yutong V6E ==
The battery electric variant based on the Tianjun V6 model called the Tianjun V6E. the Tianjun V6E is powered by an electric motor placed on the rear axle developing a maximum output of 180kW and 370Nm of torque. The battery options of the V6E are 100.460kWh and 132.016kWh with a range of 280km and 380km respectively. Both battery options are supplied by CATL.
