= Zhengzhou BRT Route B1 =

Bus route in Zhengzhou, China

B1
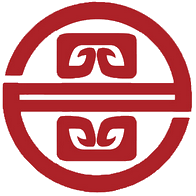

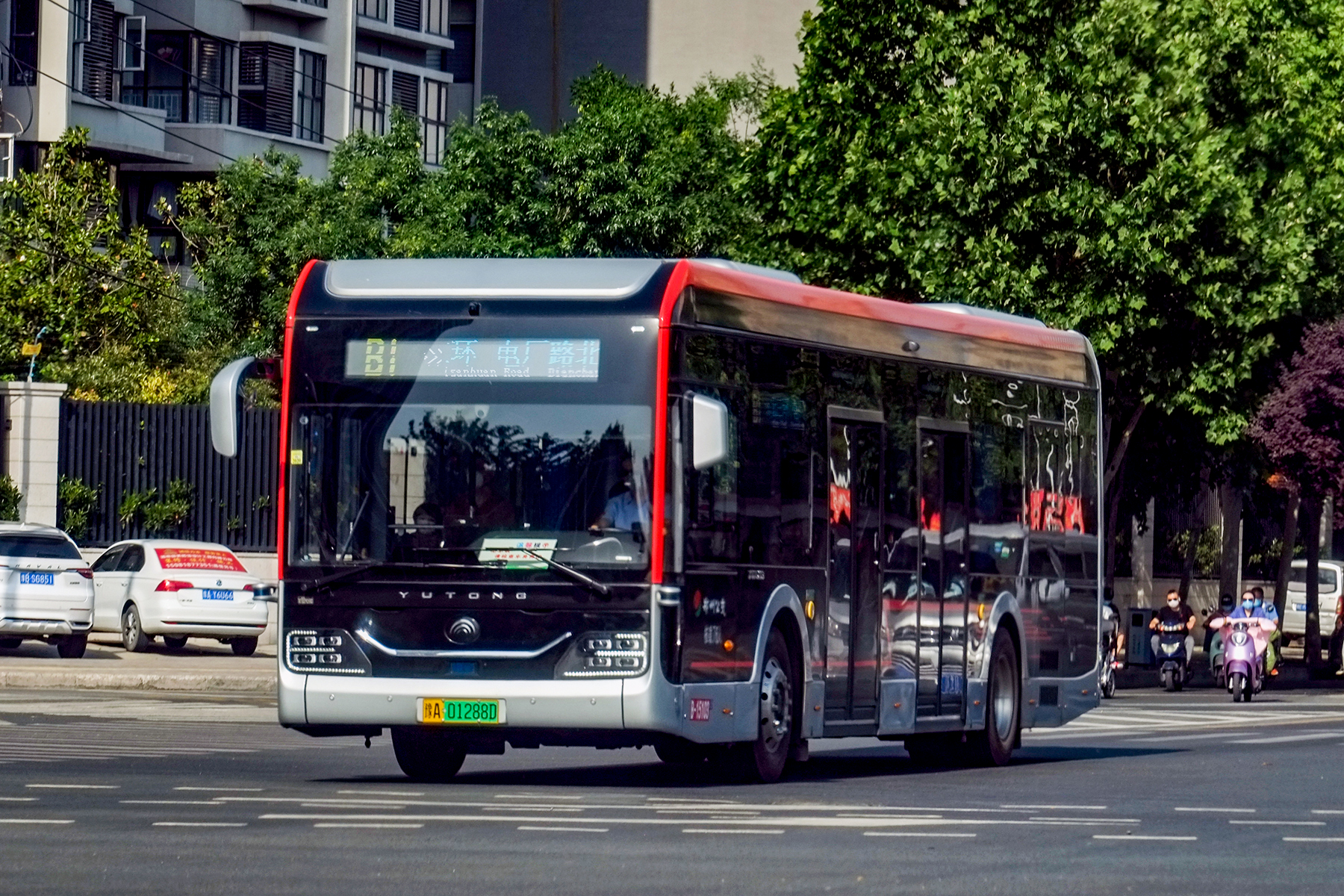

Overview
- System: Zhengzhou BRT
- Operator: Zhengzhou Bus Communication Corporation
- Vehicle: Yutong U12; Yutong ZK6125CHEVNPG4; Yutong ZK6180CHEVNPG3
- Status: Operational
- Began service: 2009
- Predecessors: Zhengzhou Bus Route 96

Route
- Locale: Zhengzhou
- Start: Zhongzhou Avenue and Nongye Road
- End: Dianchang Road B/T
- Length: 26 km (16 mi)
- Stops: 32

Service
- Level: Daily
- Frequency: Every 2-5 minutes
- Operates: 6:00 am – 9:30 pm

Zhengzhou BRT Route B1 is a bus rapid transit route operated by Zhengzhou Bus. The route is the first ever route with dedicated bus lanes in Zhengzhou BRT.

== History ==
The route was officially commenced on 28 May 2009, together with 8 other feeder routes. The route was initially a loop line running on Nongye Road, Zhongzhou Avenue, Weilai Road, Hanghai Road and Tongbai Road.

Due to the construction of Zhengzhou Metro Line 5 on Hanghai Road and Tongbai Road and the construction of Nongye Expressway above Nongye Road, most platforms of the route on these three roads have been removed. Currently, services of the route on Nongye Road has been suspended.

== Route ==
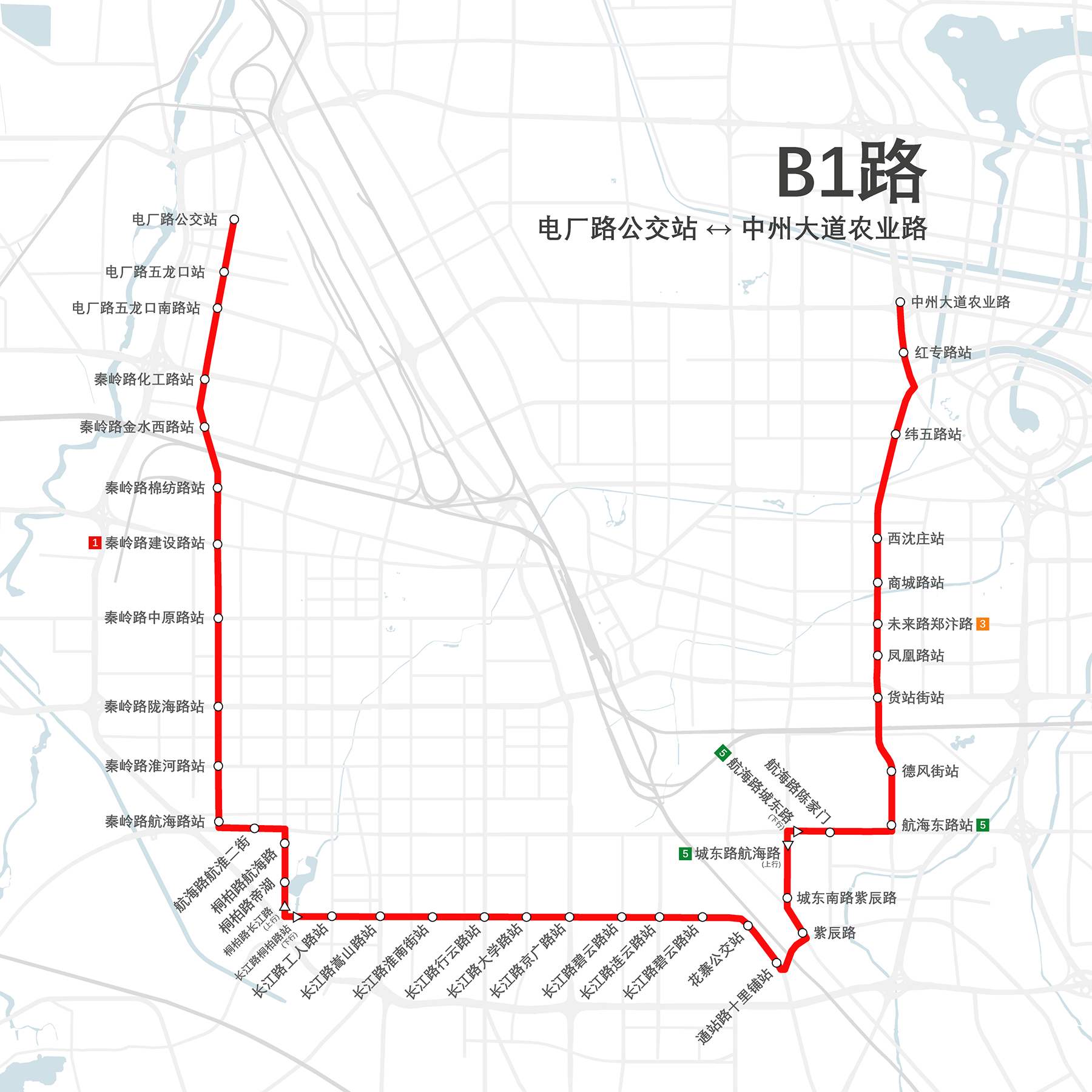
B1 Trunk Route

The route is U-shaped, running on Zhongzhou Avenue, Weilai Road, Hanghai Road, Tongbai Road, Wulongkou S. Road and Dianchang Road, with the eastern terminus at Zhongzhou Avenue and Nongye Road and the western terminus at Dianchang Road B/T.

== Branch routes ==
The route has a number of branch routes, which are free-interchangeable with the main route.

- B10: Kunlun Road and Longhai Road ↔ Fogang B/T
- B12: Zhengzhou railway station (North Terminus) ↔ Lamei Road B/T
- B13: Dianchang Road B/T ↔ Kunlun Road and Ruhe Road
- B15: North 3rd Ring Road and Zhongzhou Avenue ↔ Shihua Road B/T
- B16: Shangwu Inner Ring Road and Shangwu E. 1st Street ↔ Ganjiang Road B/T
- B17: Zhengzhou railway station (South Terminus) ↔ Jingkai 8th Avenue B/T
- B18: Gaocun (Wenhua Road) ↔ Minsheng E. Street and Zhengguang Road
- B19: Liuzhuang (Huayuan Road) ↔ Convention and Exhibition Center (Inner Ring)
- B21: Zhengzhou railway station (Yima Road) ↔ Qinhe Road and West 3rd Ring Road
- B25: Zhengzhou East railway station ↔ Zhongzhou Avenue and Nongye Road
- B38: North 3rd Ring Road and Shakou Road ↔ Zhengzhou East railway station
- B53: Zhengzhou Bus Company ↔ Wenhua Road and Sanquan Road (N)
- 263: Huayuankou B/T ↔ Zhengzhou No.7 People's Hospital

== Fleet ==
=== Former ===
- Yutong ZK6180HGC (18m)
- Yutong ZK6180CHEVG1 (18m)

=== Current ===
- Yutong U12 (12m)
- Yutong ZK6125CHEVNPG4 (12m)
- Yutong ZK6180CHEVNPG3 (18m)
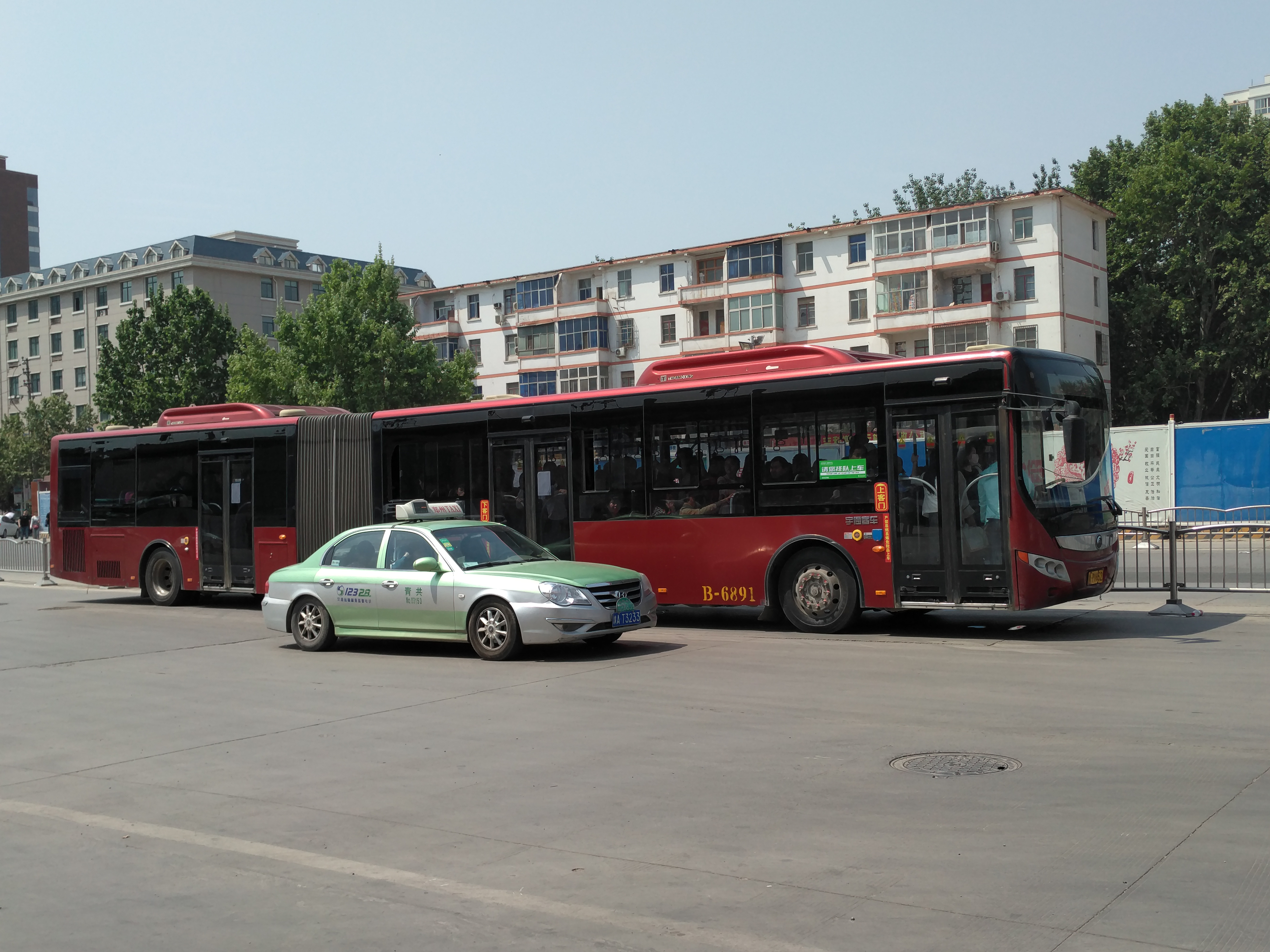
Yutong ZK6180CHEVG1

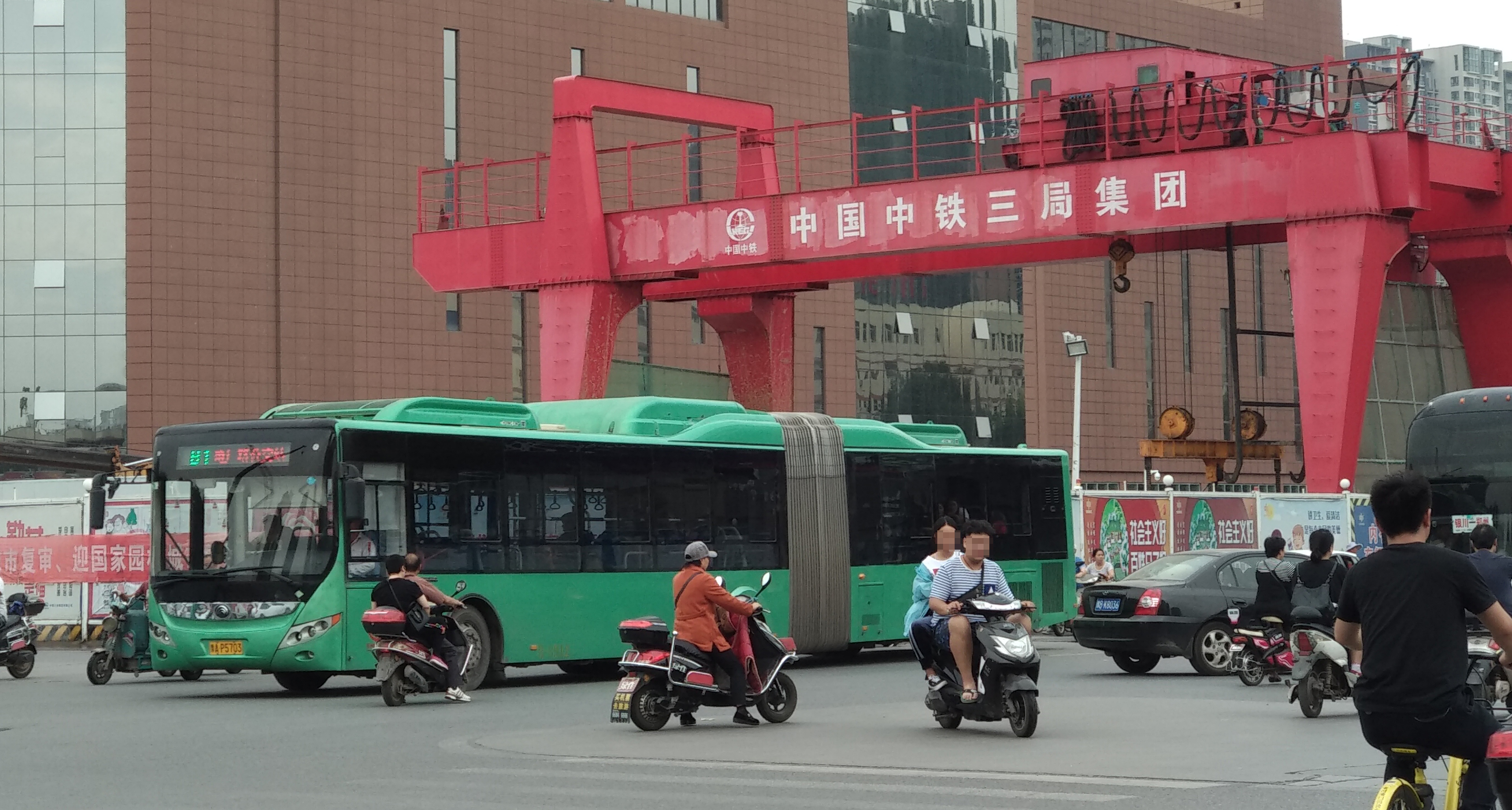
Yutong ZK6180CHEVNPG3

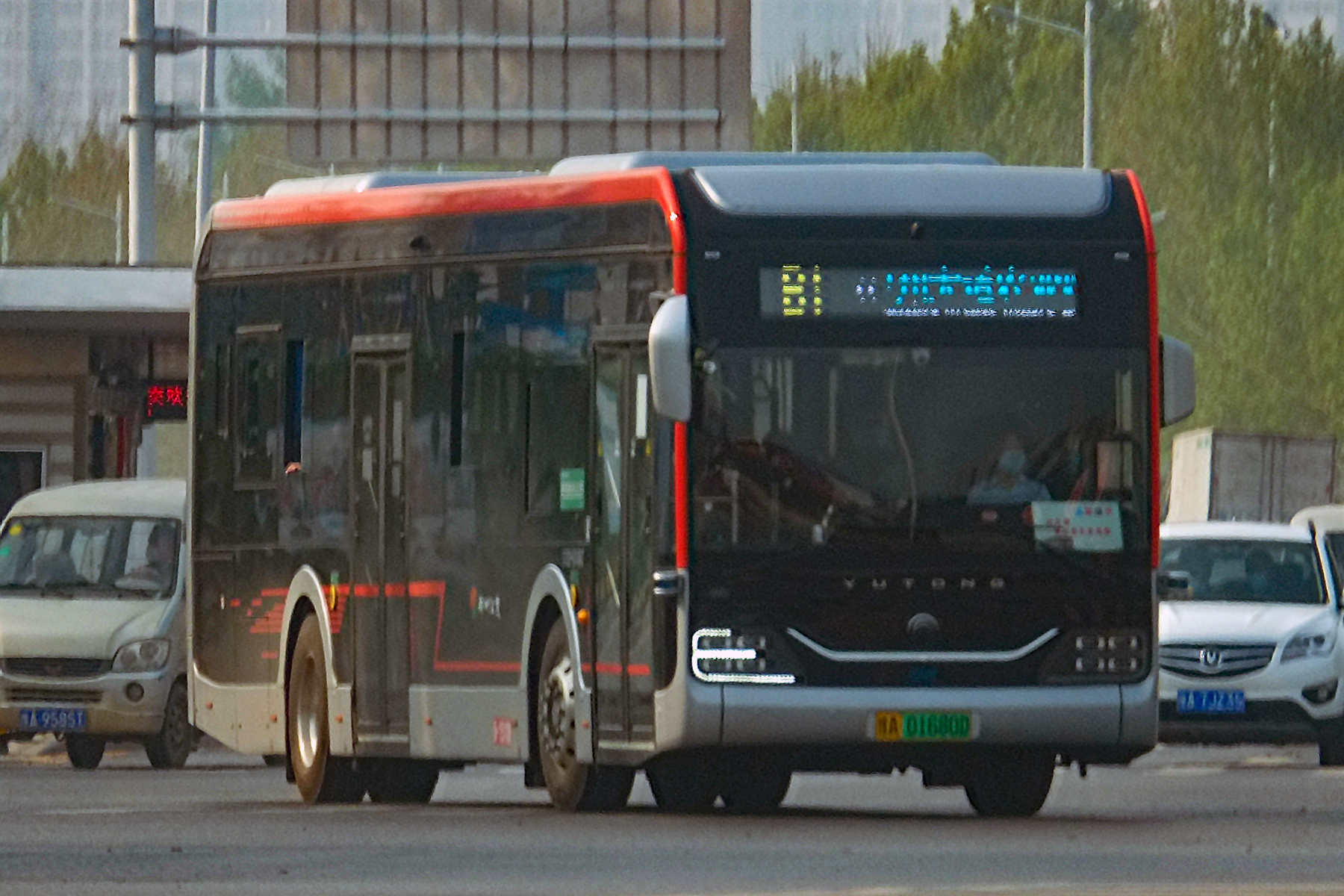
Yutong U12

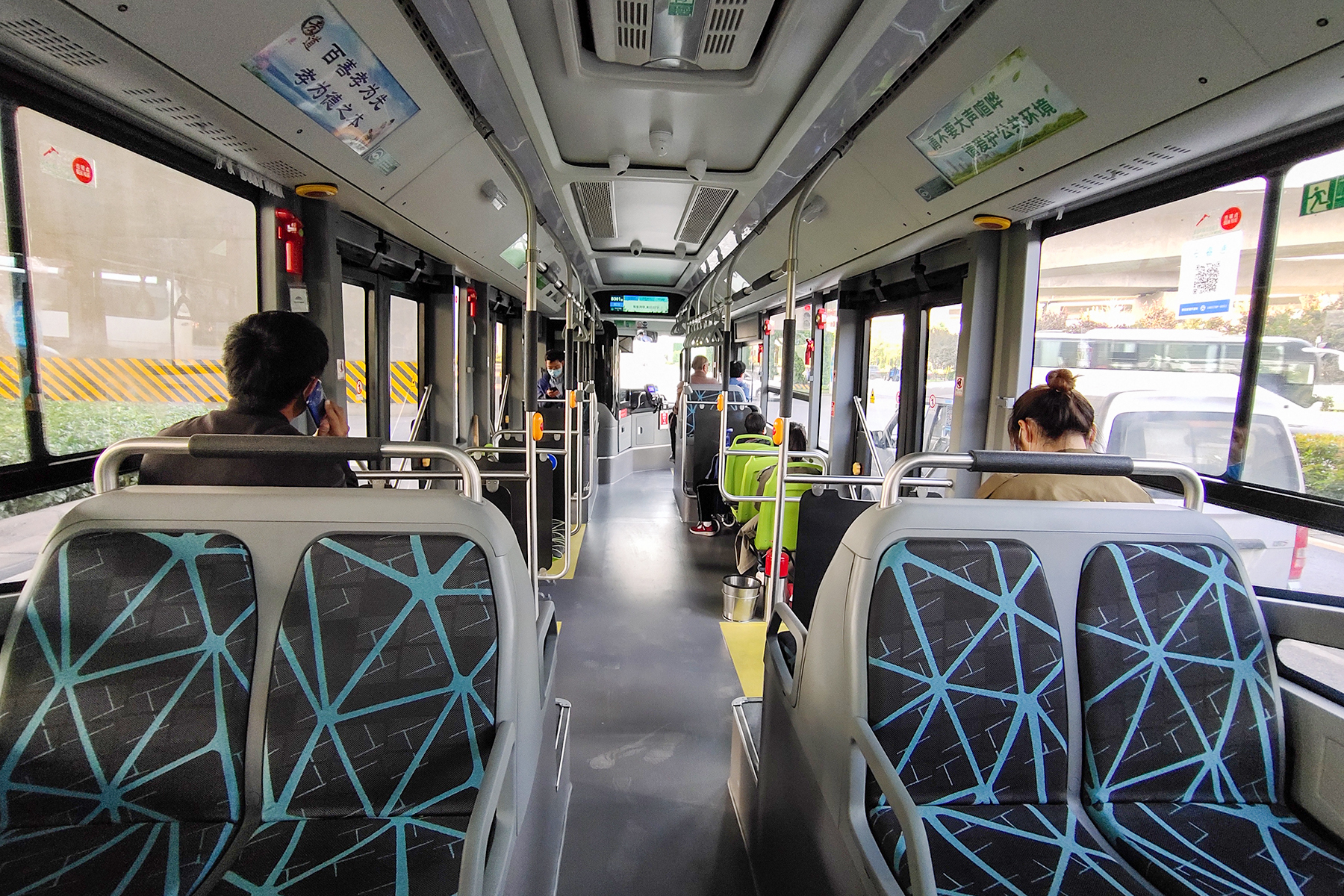
Yutong U12 interior
