= Zhengzhou BRT =

Bus service in Zhengzhou, China

Zhengzhou Bus Rapid Transit
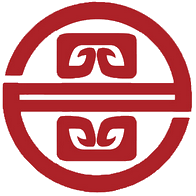

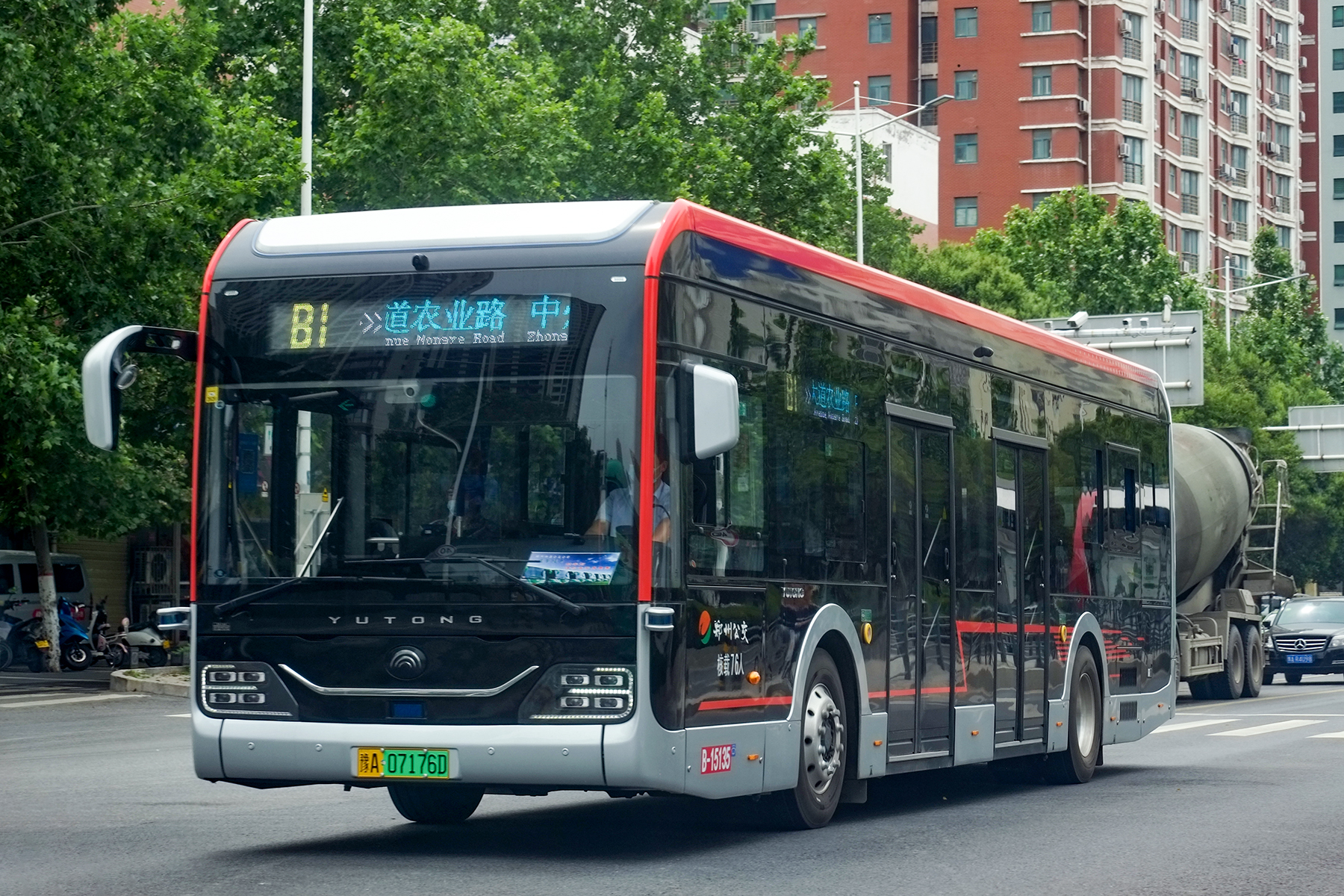

Overview
- Locale: Zhengzhou
- Transit type: Bus rapid transit
- Number of lines: 6+78
- Number of stations: 236
- Daily ridership: Over 1 million

Operation
- Began operation: May 28, 2009
- Number of vehicles: Over 1800

Technical
- System length: Over 200 km (120 mi)
- Average speed: 19 km/h (12 mph)

Zhengzhou Bus Rapid Transit
- Simplified Chinese: 郑州快速公交
- Traditional Chinese: 鄭州快速公交
Transcriptions
Standard Mandarin
- Hanyu Pinyin: Zhèngzhōu Kuàisù Gōngjiāo

Alternative Chinese name
- Simplified Chinese: 郑州 BRT
- Traditional Chinese: 鄭州 BRT
Transcriptions
Standard Mandarin
- Hanyu Pinyin: Zhèngzhōu BRT

Zhengzhou Bus Rapid Transit is a bus rapid transit system in Zhengzhou, the capital of Henan Province in the People's Republic of China. The system has 5 main trunk routes with dedicated bus lanes along with a number of feeder routes that run for a portion of the corridor and serves other areas.

== History ==
Construction of the first segment started in 2008 and free trial operations started on May 22, 2009. The system officially started operation on May 28, 2009 with a 30 km loop line (B1) with 38 stations. Average ridership of the system in 2014 was 700,000 passengers. It is believed that the daily ridership was approximately 1 million passengers after the opening of the first segment of the 23.7 km long 3rd Ring Road loop line (B3) on June 26, 2014. The route B3 interlined with 15 feeder routes. A new east-west BRT corridor under the Longhai Elevated Road opened on January 26, 2017. This corridor is served by route B5. With the imminent opening of Zhengzhou Metro Line 5 The B1 Loop corridor is being shifted from to avoid duplication. The Zhengzhou government is proposing to introduce trolleybus lines to the B2 Nongye Road BRT corridor, reintroducing trolleybus operation to Zhengzhou which stopped operation in 2010. In 2019, overhead trolleybus lines were installed along the B2 Corridor.

== Routes ==
Main trunk routes with dedicated bus lanes:

- B1: Zhongzhou Avenue & Nongye Road — Dianchang Road Bus Terminal (Route altered after Zhengzhou Metro Line 5 began operation in May 2019)
- B2 (trolleybus): Zhongzhou Avenue Station (BRT) → West 3rd Ring Road Station (BRT) / West 3rd Ring Road & Huagong Road → Zhongzhou Avenue Station (BRT), runs mostly under the Nongye Elevated Road
- B3: Loop Line, runs on North, West and South 3rd Ring Road and Zhongzhou Avenue. (E.) Hanghai Road Bus Terminal (BRT) is the terminal of inner loop. Zhongzhou Avenue & Hanghai Road Station (BRT) is the terminal of outer loop.
- B5: (W.) Huaihe Road Bus Terminal — Zhengzhou East Railway Station (BRT), runs mostly under the Longhai Elevated Road
- B6: Liuzhuang Bus Terminal - Zhengzhou East Railway Station North Bus Bay (BRT), runs along Huayuan Road, North and East 3rd Ring Road
- B7: Yütong Road Bus Terminal - Zhengzhou East Railway Station (BRT), runs along (S.) Zijingshan Road, South and East 3rd Ring Road

There are also dozens of feeder routes connecting the main routes with other areas of the city.

- B101: Dianchang Road Bus Terminal - Shihua Road Bus Terminal
- B201: Kangqiao Shanhaiyuntu Bus Terminal → Wulongkou Bus Terminal / Wulongkou S. Road & Rantun E. Road → Kangqiao Shanhaiyuntu Bus Terminal
- B202: Zhongzhou Avenue Station (BRT) - Zhengzhou East Railway Station (BRT)
- B11: Zhongzhou Avenue Heizhuang → (S.) Xinghua Street & South 3rd Ring Road / Huancui Road Bus Terminal → Zhongzhou Avenue Heizhuang
- B12: Lamei Road Bus Terminal - West Square of Railway Station
- B13: Dianchang Road Bus Terminal - Kunlun Road & Ruhe Road
- B15: Shihua Road Bus Terminal → Jiuru Road & North 3rd Ring Road / Jiuru Road → Shihua Road Bus Terminal
- B16: Ganjiang Road Bus Terminal - CBD Inner Ring Road & CBD E. 1st Street
- B18: Wenhua Road Gaocun Bus Terminal - Minsheng E. Street & Zhengguang Road
- B19: Convention and Exhibition Center Inner Ring Road - Provincial Sports Center
- B20: Liuzhuang Bus Terminal - Railway Station North Bus Bay
- B23: Comprehensive Investment Zone - Jianshe Road & West 3rd Ring Road
- B27: Jinbai Road Bus Terminal - Zhengzhou Foreign Language School New Fengyang Campus
- B32: (N.) Wangwu Road Bus Terminal - Zhengbian Road & Zhongzhou Avenue
- B38: North 3rd Ring Road & Shakou Road - Zhengzhou East Railway Station
- B50: Liulisi New Village - Railway Station North Bus Bay
- B51: Wulongkou Bus Terminal - Kaiyuan Road & Tianyuan Road
- B52: Tianshan Road Bus Terminal - Nongke Road & Jingsan Road
- B53: Yingcai Street Bus Terminal - Zhengzhou Bus Group
- B60: South 4th Ring Road & Jingguang Road - Railway Station South Bus Bay
- B67: Jinbai Road Bus Terminal - Zijingshan Jinshui Road W.
- 1: Huashan Road Bus Terminal - Railway Station South Bus Bay
- G2: Suoling Road Bus Terminal → Zhengbian Road & Jianye Road / Zhengbian Road & Zhongzhou Avenue → Suoling Road Bus Terminal
- 13: Suzhuang - Railway Station
- G37: Xingguo Road Bus Terminal - Convention and Exhibition Center
- 38: Yaozhuang Bus Terminal - Railway Station
- 42: S. 5th Road of Economic and Technological Development Zone Bus Terminal - North 3rd Ring Road & Wenhua Road
- G50: (N.) Wangwu Road Bus Terminal - Tongzhan Road Bus Terminal
- G52: (S.) Dongfeng Road & Shangdu Road (Provincial Orthopedic Hospital) → West 3rd Ring Road & Changjiang Road Station (BRT) / West 3rd Ring Road Lücheng Park Station (BRT) → (S.) Dongfeng Road & Shangdu Road (Provincial Orthopedic Hospital)
- G62: Dongzhao Bus Terminal - Huancui Road Bus Terminal
- G63: Hanghai Road Baguamiao → Zhongzhou Avenue & Nongye Road / Zhongzhou Avenue & Nongye Road → Baguamiao Bus Terminal
- G69: North 3rd Ring Road & Zhongzhou Avenue Station (BRT) → Jianshe Road Sanguanmiao / Jianshe Road Sanguanmiao → Zhongzhou Avenue & Guangdian S. Road
- 70: Provincial Sports Center - West Square of Railway Station
- 79: Shaoyuan Bus Terminal - Bishagang
- G80: Huazhai Bus Terminal - Zhongzhou Avenue Heizhuang
- G82: Jinshajiang Road Bus Terminal - Chenxu Road & Zhongzhou Avenue
- 84: Huancui Road Bus Terminal → Huagong Road & Dianchang Road / Huagong Road & West 3rd Ring Road → Huancui Road Bus Terminal
- G87: Zhengjiao ICR Nanyangzhai railway station → Jinsegangwan / Hanghai Road & Zhongzhou Avenue → Zhengjiao ICR Nanyangzhai railway station
- 100: Lamei Road Bus Terminal - Zijingshan Renmin Road
- 111: South 4th Ring Road & Jingguang Road → Kunlun Road & Longhai Road / Kunlun Road & Longhai Road → North Gate of Bairong World Trade Market
- 115: Shangdu Road Shilipu → Henan University / Henan University → Shangdu Road & Tongtai Road
- 129: South Coach Station - Zhengzhou East Railway Station North Bus Bay (BRT)
- 131: Yangjin Road Bus Terminal - Huayuan Road Station (BRT)
- 136: Bairong World Trade Market - Zijingshan Road & Hanghai Road
- 158: East Square of Zhengzhou East Railway Station - Hongqi Road & Jingyi Road
- 165: Huancui Road Bus Terminal - Zhengzhou East Railway Station
- 185: Yanghuai Bus Terminal - Nanyang Road & Dongfeng Road
- 186: Guoji Road Bus Terminal - Xiong'erhe Road & Zhongwang Road
- G188: Zhongzhou Avenue & Nongye Road → 9th Street & S. 9th Road of Economic and Technological Development Zone / 9th Street & S. 9th Road of Economic and Technological Development Zone → Nongye Road & Zhongzhou Avenue
- 189: Jinxiang Road Bus Terminal → Tongtai Road & Longhai Road / Longhai Road & Tongtai Road → Jinxiang Road Bus Terminal
- 193: South 3rd Ring Road & Tongzhan Road → Convention and Exhibition Center / Convention and Exhibition Center → Tongzhan Road Bus Terminal
- 196: Huayuankou Bus Terminal - Nongye Road & Fengle Road
- 198: Xiangrui Road Bus Terminal - (S.) Dongfeng Road & Shangdu Road (Provincial Orthopedics Hospital)
- 199: Jindai Road & Dingrui Street → Zijingshan Road & Shunhe Road / Zijingshan Road & Shunhe Road → Yaozhuang Bus Terminal
- G204: Houcang Village - Daxue Road & South 3rd Ring Road
- 206: Convention and Exhibition Center - Railway Station South Bus Bay
- 209: Provincial Sports Center - Zhongzhou Avenue & Minhang Road
- 210: Tongzhan Road Bus Terminal - Xingguo Road Bus Terminal
- 212: (E.) Hanghai Road Bus Terminal (BRT) → Anzhuang / East 3rd Ring Road & Shuanghu Avenue → Hanghai Road & Zhongzhou Avenue
- 213: Tongzhan Road Bus Terminal - West Square of Railway Station
- 262: Babao Auto Parts City - Zhengzhou East Railway Station North Bus Bay (BRT)
- G263: Huayuankou Bus Terminal - Zhengzhou East Railway Station
- 265: Boxue Road Bus Terminal - Zijingshan Huayuan Road
- 276: Yanghuai Bus Terminal - Zhengdong New Area the First Affiliated Hospital of Zhengzhou University
- 279: Jinbai Road Bus Terminal - Hehuan Street Station (BRT)
- 285: Zhengzhou East Railway Station North Bus Bay (BRT) - Jingqi Road & Jinshui Road
- 292: Jinxiang Road Bus Terminal - Longhai Road & Xinzheng Road
- 297: 8th Street of Economic and Technological Development Zone Bus Terminal - (E.) Xunjiang Road & Huaxi Street
- 727: Jinliu Road Bus Terminal - Defeng Street Station (BRT)
- S121: Yaozhuang Bus Terminal - Zhengzhou No.3 People's Hospital
- S158: North 3rd Ring Road & Shakou Road - Zijingshan Jinshui Road W.
- S166: Shihua Road Bus Terminal - Zhengzhou No.3 People's Hospital
- S185: Zhongzhou Avenue Station (BRT) - Zhengzhou East Railway Station North Bus Bay (BRT)
- S189: Exit B of Xiliuhu Metro Station - Hanghai Road & Xinghua Street
- S207: Convention and Exhibition Center Outer Ring Road → Henan University / Henan University → Convention and Exhibition Center
- S211: (E.) Hanghai Road Bus Terminal (BRT) → Xinyi Road & Shangdu Road / Xinyi Road & Shangdu Road → Zhongzhou Avenue & Hanghai Road
- S227: Jincheng Avenue Bus Terminal - North 3rd Ring Road & Jingsan Road Station (BRT)
- Zhengdong New Area Autonomous Bus Line 1: Financial Island City Exhibition Hall - Zhongyi Road & North 3rd Ring Road. Loop line, runs along North 3rd Ring Road, Longhu Inner and Middle Ring Road, and on Financial Island of Zhengdong New Area. This line has Level 3 Autonomous Driving buses.

== Gallery ==
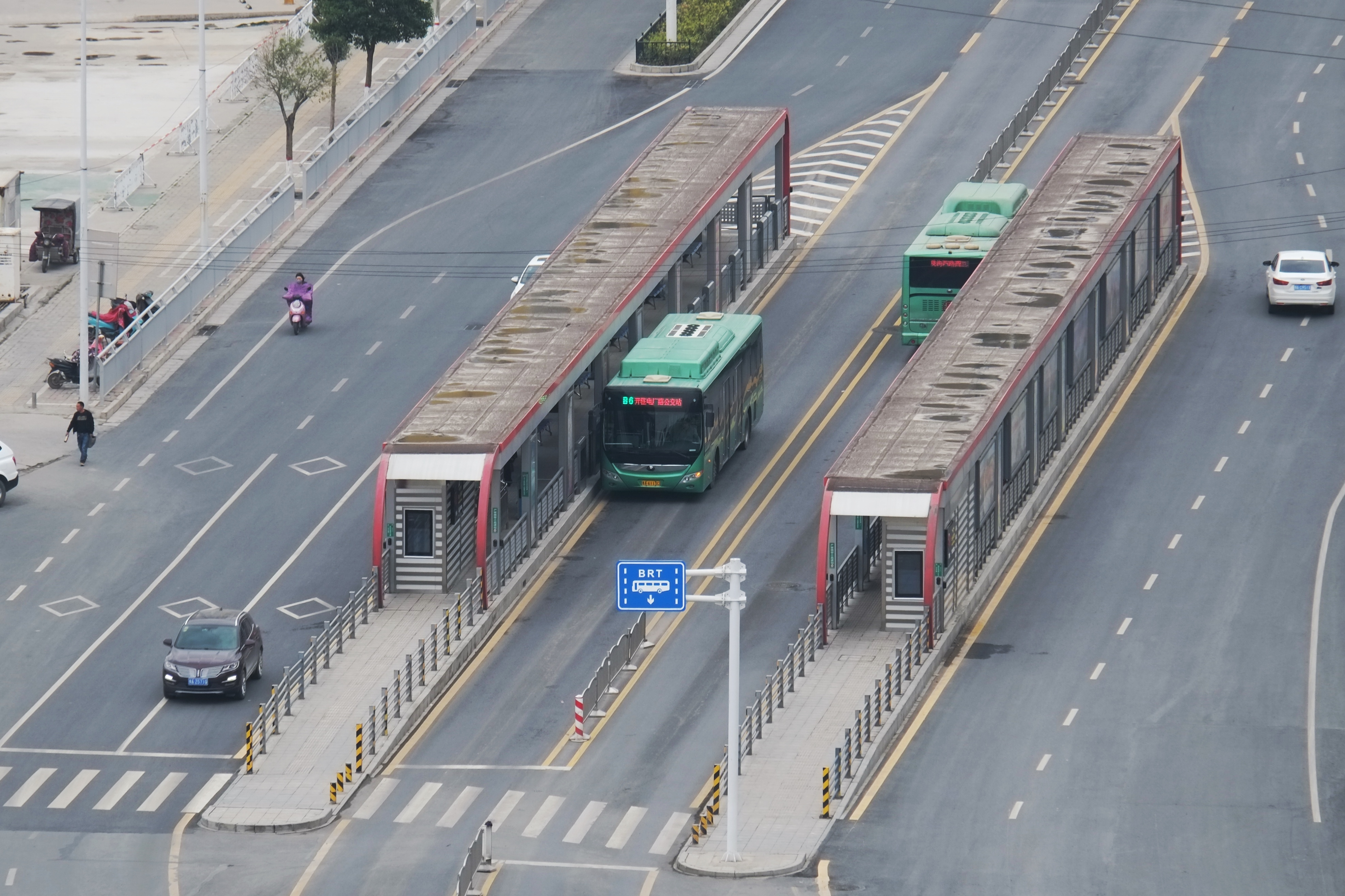
Dianchang Road station with buses of Route B6 stopping by

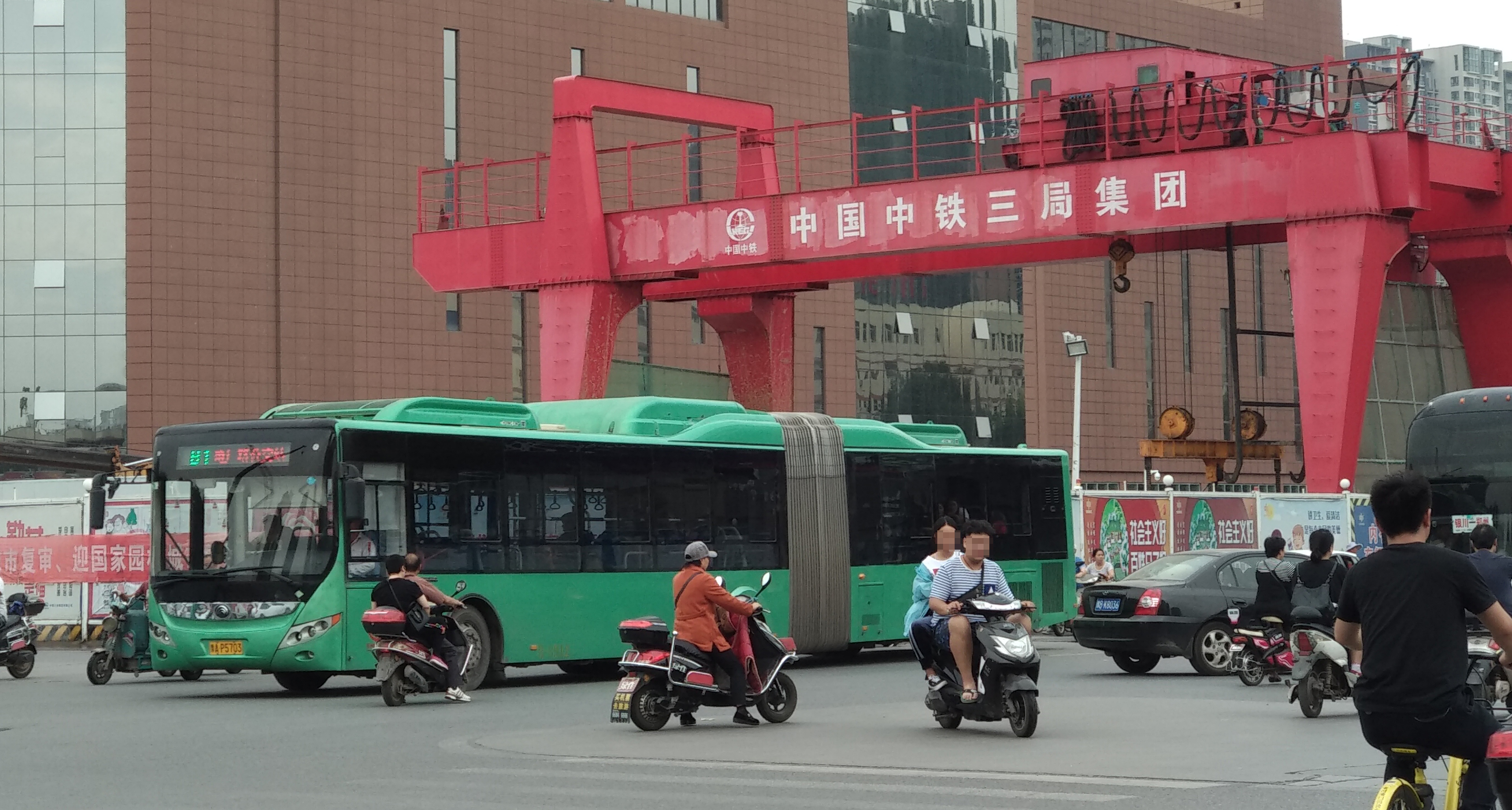
Yutong articulated bus on route B1

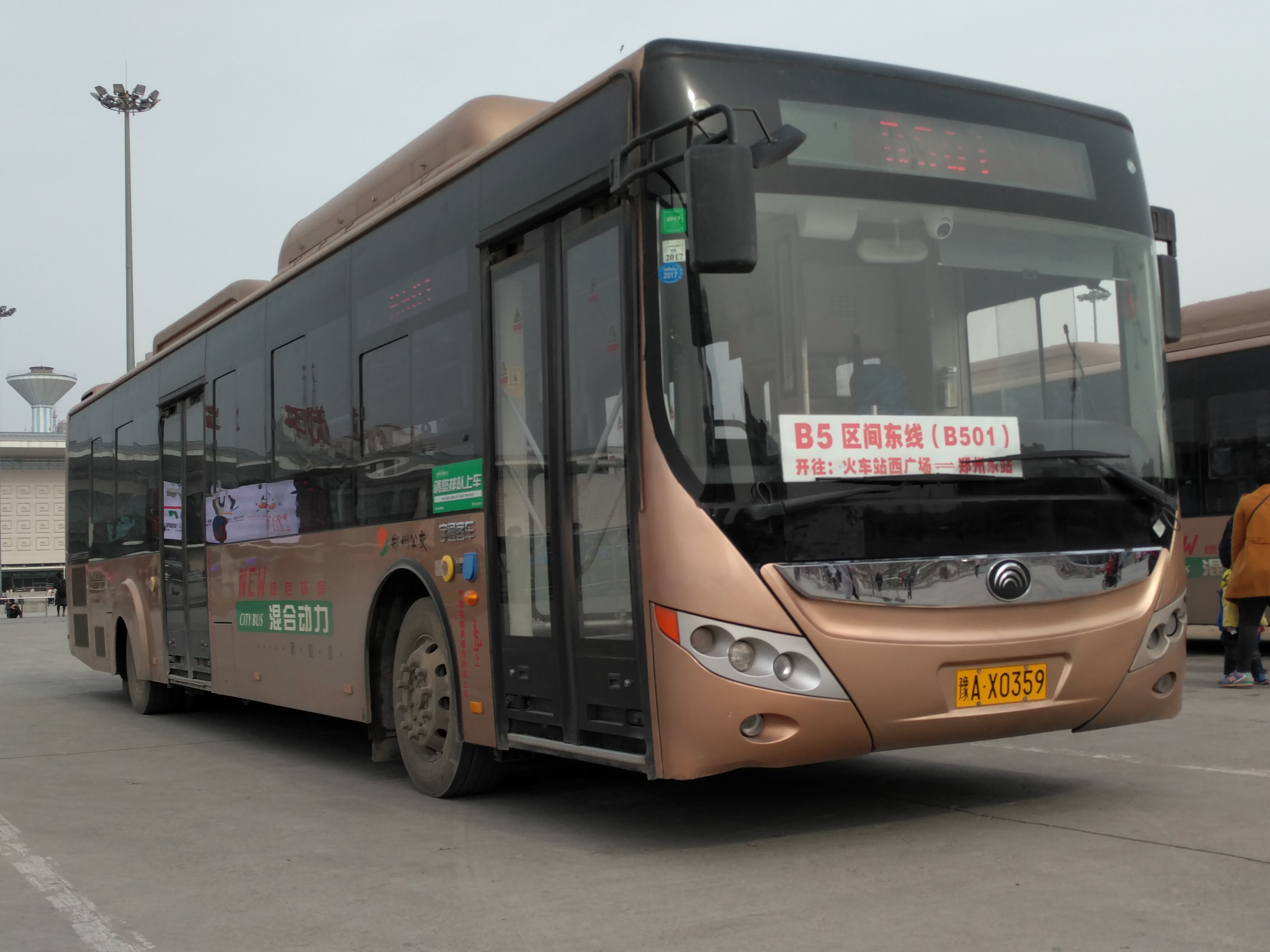
Yutong bus on route B501

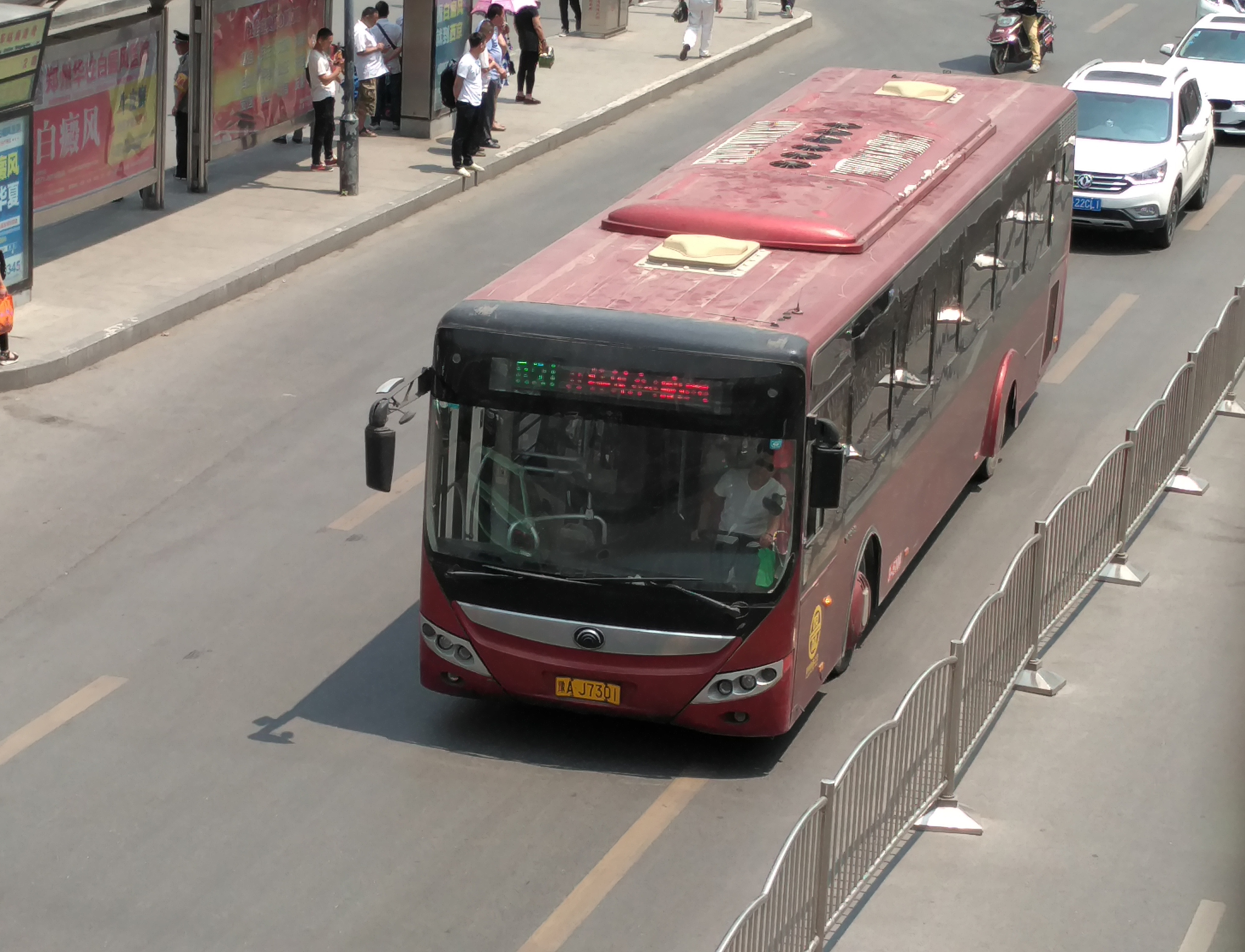
Yutong ZK6128HGK bus (retired). This type used to form the backbone of the system

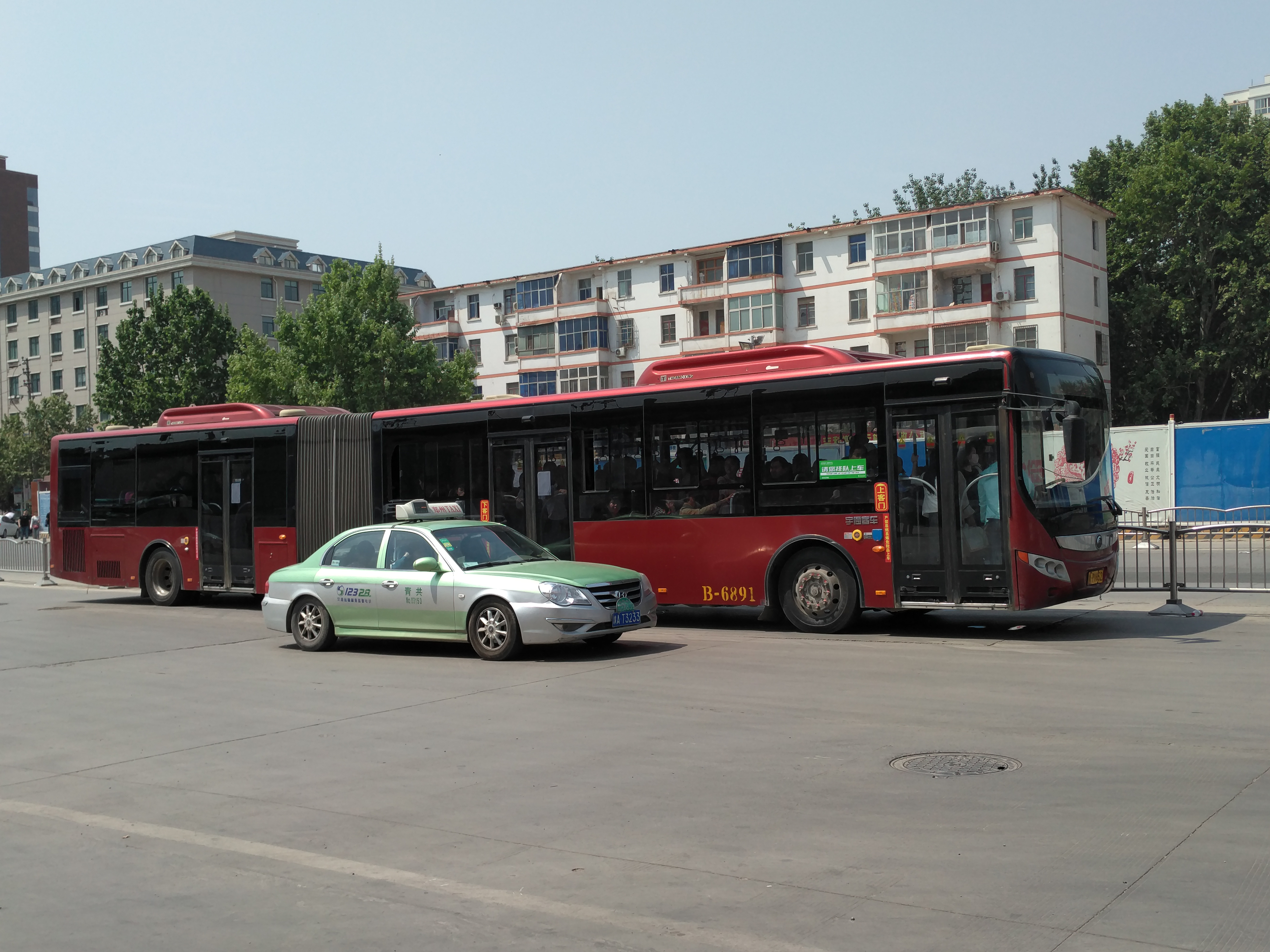
Yutong ZK6180CHEVG1 bus (retired) on route B1

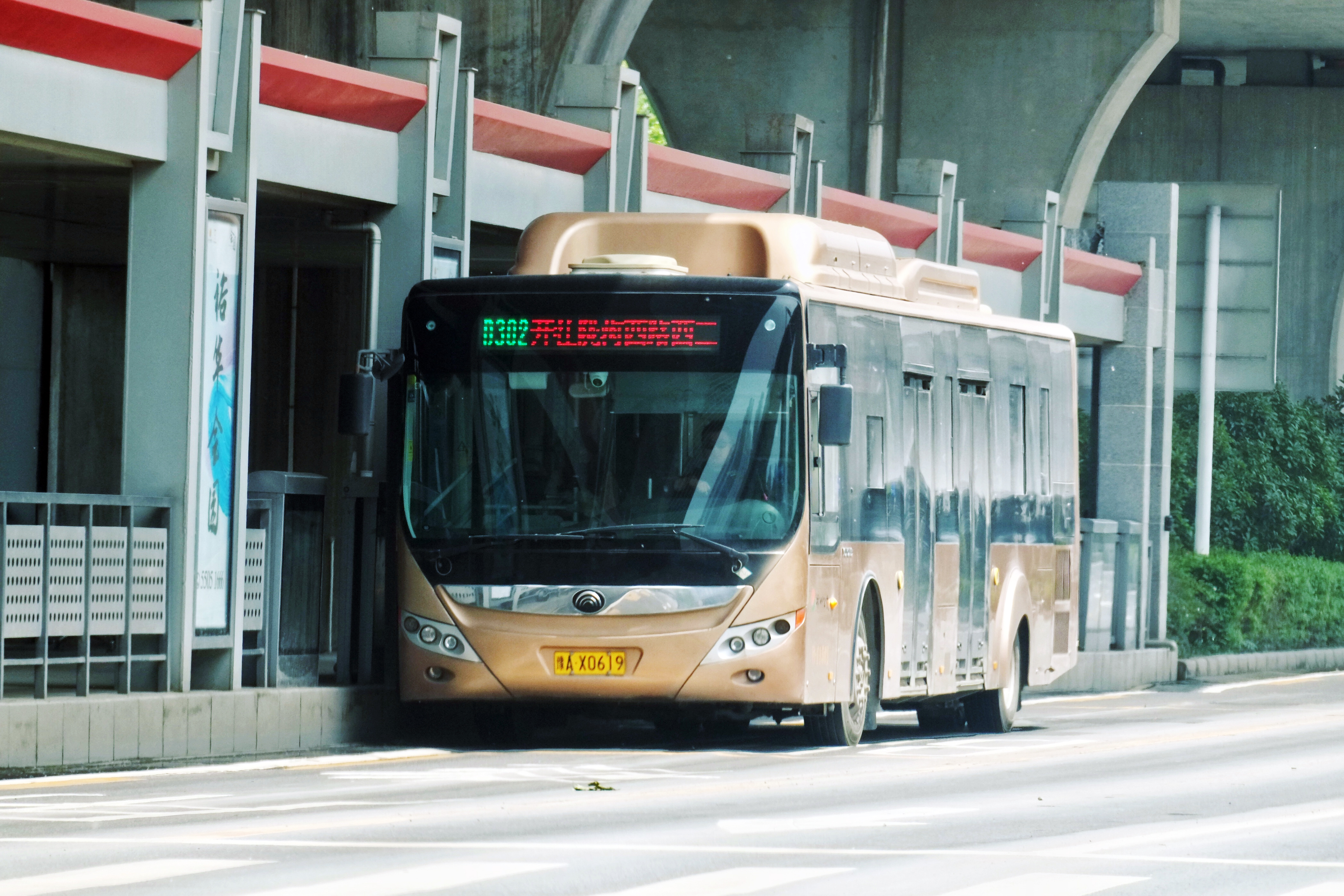
Yutong bus on route B302
