= Zhengzhou BRT Route B6 =

Former bus route in Zhengzhou, China

B6
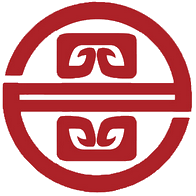

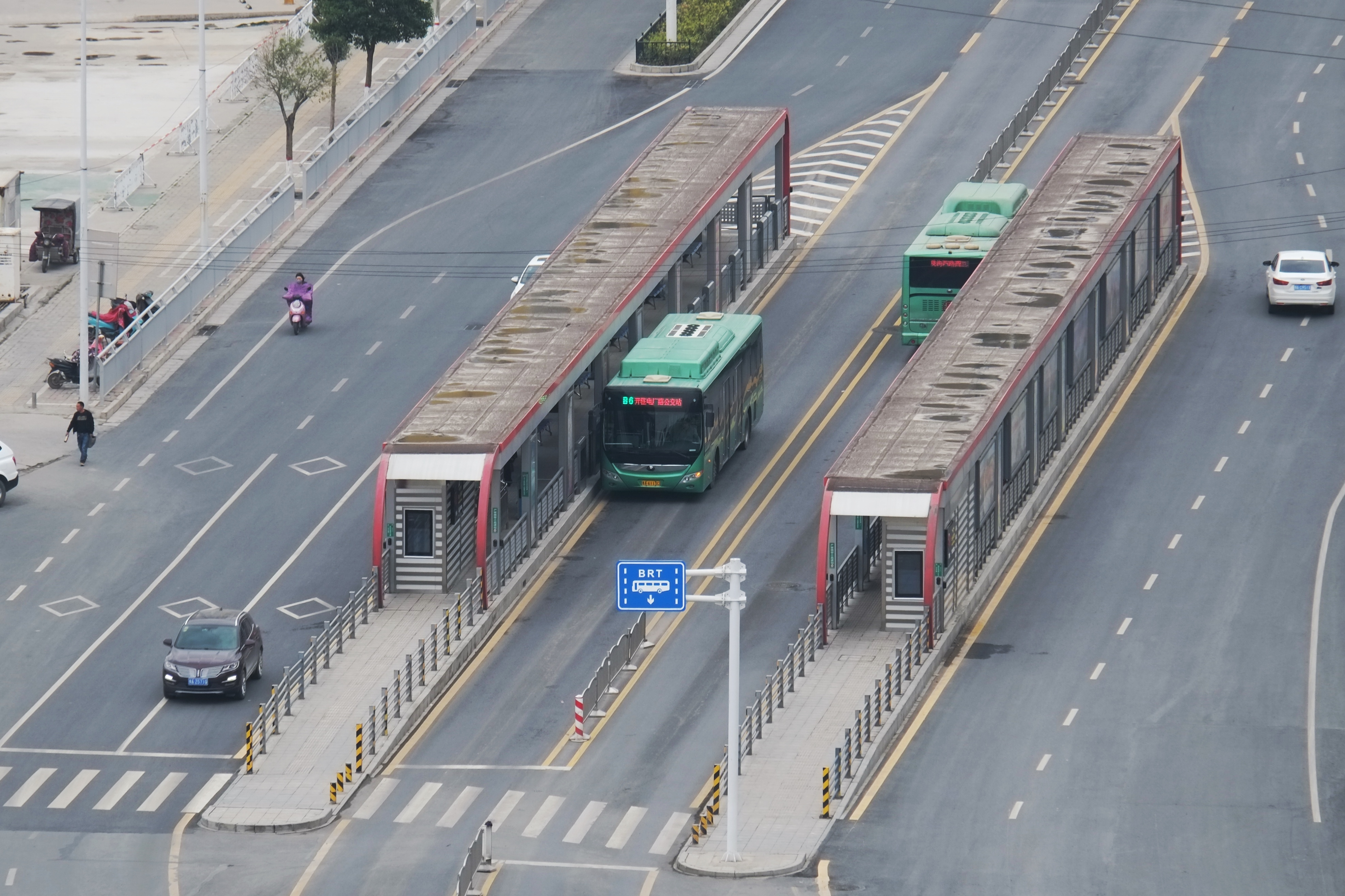
- Dianchang Road station with buses on Route B6

Overview
- System: Zhengzhou BRT
- Operator: Zhengzhou Bus Communication Corporation
- Vehicle: Yutong ZK6180CHEVNPG3 (18m); Yutong H12 (12m); Yutong E12 (12m)
- Status: Closed
- Began service: 28 April 2016
- Ended service: 26 May 2019

Route
- Locale: Zhengzhou
- Start: Dianchang Road B/T (loop line)
- Length: 42 km (26 mi)
- Stops: 53
- Other routes: B601

Service
- Level: Daily
- Operates: 6:00 am – 9:00 pm

Zhengzhou BRT Route B6 was a discontinued bus rapid transit route operated by Zhengzhou Bus.

== History ==
The route was commenced on 28 April 2016, together with two interval services (east interval and west interval).

On 26 March 2018, the two interval services were merged into one, designated as B601.

On 26 May 2019, the route together with Route B601 stopped service due to the adjustment of bus routes after the opening of Zhengzhou Metro Line 5.

== Route ==
The route was a loop line running on Dianchang Road, North 3rd Ring Road, Zhongzhou Avenue, Weilai Road, Hanghai Road, Changjiang Road, Tongbai Road and Qinling Road, with Dianchang Road Bus Terminus as the terminal station.

== Branch routes ==
The route had a number of branch routes, which were free-interchangeable with the main route.

- Interval services:
  - B601: Dianchang Road B/T ↔ Defeng Street station
- Feeder routes:
  - 3: Huanggang Temple ↔ Dongjiancai
  - 37: Zhongyuan Road and West 3rd Ring Road ↔ Zijingshan (Renmin Road)
  - 79: Huayuankou B/T ↔ Bishagang
  - 84: Zhengshou South Coach Station ↔ Huagong Road and West 3rd Ring Road
  - 111: Metro Nansihuan station ↔ Yixueyuan
  - 129: Zhengzhou East railway station Coach Station ↔ Zhengzhou South Coach Station
  - 179: Zhengzhou railway station (West Plaza) ↔ Jiangang
  - 193: Zidong Road B/T ↔ Minhang Garden B/T
  - 204: Houcang ↔ Daxue Road and South 3rd Ring Road
  - 206: Convention and Exhibition Center (Jiuru Road) ↔ Zhengzhou railway station (South Terminus)
  - 213: Zhengzhou railway station (West Plaza) ↔ Tongzhan Road B/T
  - 263: Huayuankou B/T ↔ Zhengzhou No.7 People's Hospital
  - B15: North 3rd Ring Road and Zhongzhou Avenue ↔ Shihua Road B/T
  - B16: Shangwu Inner Ring Road and Shangwu E. 1st Street ↔ Ganjiang Road B/T
  - B17: Zhengzhou railway station (South Terminus) ↔ Jingkai 8th Avenue B/T
  - B18: Gaocun (Wenhua Road) ↔ Minsheng E. Street and Zhengguang Road
  - B19: Liuzhuang (Huayuan Road) ↔ Convention and Exhibition Center (Inner Ring)
  - B25: Zhengzhou East railway station ↔ Zhongzhou Avenue and Nongye Road
  - B32: Kexue Avenue B/T ↔ Zijingshan (Huayuan Road)
  - B37: Henan Sports Center ↔ Zijingshan (Huayuan Road)
  - B38: North 3rd Ring Road and Shakou Road ↔ Zhengzhou East railway station
  - B50: Gaocun (Fengqing Road) ↔ Zijingshan (Huayuan Road)
  - B51: Kaiyuan Road B/T ↔ Wulongkou B/T
  - B52: Zhengzhou Institute of Finance and Economics ↔ Nongke Road and Jingsan Road
  - B53: Zhengzhou Bus Company ↔ Wenhua Road and Sanquan Road (N)
  - B66: North 3rd Ring Road and Nanyang Road ↔ Jinhe Park

== Fleet ==
- Yutong ZK6128HGK (former)
- Yutong ZK6139HGA (former)
- Yutong ZK6180CHEVNPG3
- Yutong E12
- Yutong H12
