= Zhengzhou BRT Route B2 =

Bus route in Zhengzhou, China

B2
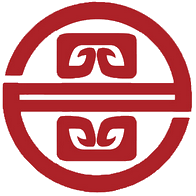

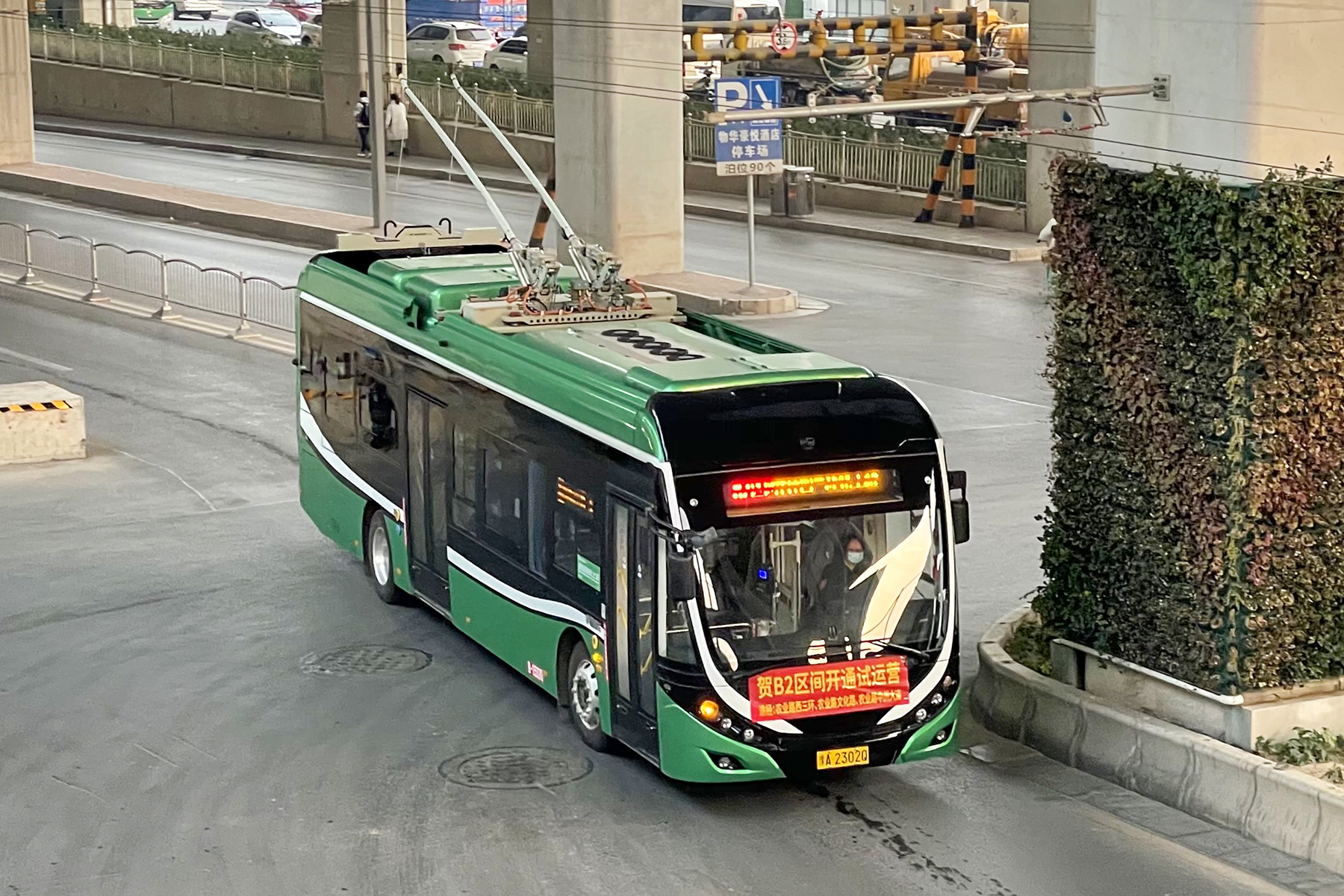

Overview
- System: Zhengzhou BRT Trolleybus
- Operator: Zhengzhou Bus Communication Corporation
- Vehicle: Yutong ZK6180CHEVNPG3 (18m); Yutong ZK6125CHEVNPG4 (12m); Yutong E12 (12m)
- Livery: Green (18m articulated bus and E12); Brown (other 12m buses)
- Status: Operational
- Began service: 26 January 2014

Route
- Locale: Zhengzhou
- Start: Daxie B/T
- End: Zhongzhou Avenue
- Length: 23 km (14 mi)
- Stops: 32

Service
- Level: Daily
- Operates: 6:00 am – 9:30 pm

Zhengzhou BRT Route B2 is a bus rapid transit route operated by Zhengzhou Bus. It is the 2nd route with dedicated bus lanes in Zhengzhou BRT.

== History ==
The route was commenced on 26 January 2014, operating on Changchun Road, Lianhua Street, Ruida Road, Huagong Road, Rantun Road and Nongye Road.

Due to the construction of Nongye Expressway, the route was diverted from Nongye Road to Dongfeng Road on 21 July 2015. After the completion of Nongye Expressway with new island platforms under the elevated highway, the east section of the route returned to Nongye Road on 26 May 2017.

In 2019, trolleybus overhead wires were installed under the Nongye Elevated for conversion of B2 to an eBRT corridor, preparing for the return of trolleybuses to Zhengzhou. Trolleybus operation in service began on 1 January 2021.

== Route ==
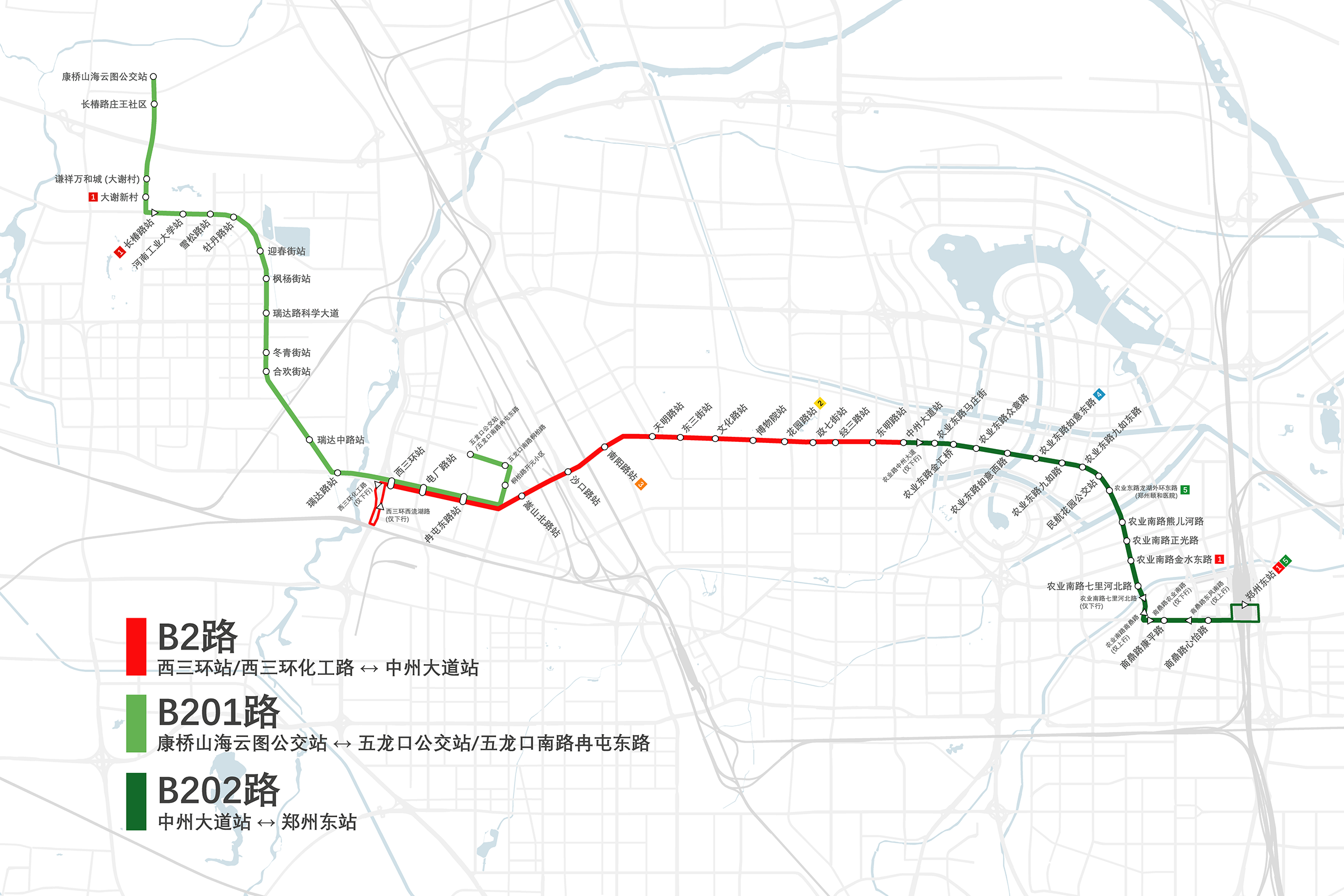
B2 Trunk Route

The west terminus of the route is Daxie bus terminus in the high-tech zone in northwestern Zhengzhou, and the east terminus is Zhongzhou Avenue and Nongye Road station near Zhengdong New Area.

== Branch routes ==
The route has a number of branch routes, which are free-interchangeable with the main route.

- B11: Heizhuang (Zhongzhou Avenue) ↔ Huanggang Temple
- B12: Zhengzhou railway station (North Terminus) ↔ Lamei Road B/T
- B18: Gaocun (Wenhua Road) ↔ Minsheng E. Street and Zhengguang Road
- B20: Zhengzhou railway station (North Terminus) ↔ Liuzhuang (Huayuan Road)
- B27: Xushuihe E. Road and Jinju Street ↔ Dongqing Street
- B28: Duying Street and Hongsong Road ↔ Hehuan Street
- B32: Kexue Avenue B/T ↔ Zijingshan (Huayuan Road)
- B35: Daxie B/T ↔ Zhengzhou Central Hospital
- B51: Kaiyuan Road B/T ↔ Wulongkou B/T
- B53: Zhengzhou Bus Company ↔ Wenhua Road and Sanquan Road (N)
- B66: North 3rd Ring Road and Nanyang Road ↔ Jinhe Park
- B67: Zizhu Road B/T ↔ Dianchang Road B/T

== Fleet ==
- Yutong ZK6180HGC (18m, former)
- Yutong ZK6180CHEVG1 (18m, former)
- Yutong ZK6180CHEVNPG3 (18m)
- Yutong E12 (12m)
- Yutong ZK6125CHEVNPG4 (12m)
