= Zhengzhou BRT Route B5 =

Bus route in Zhengzhou, China

B5
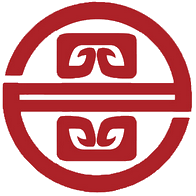

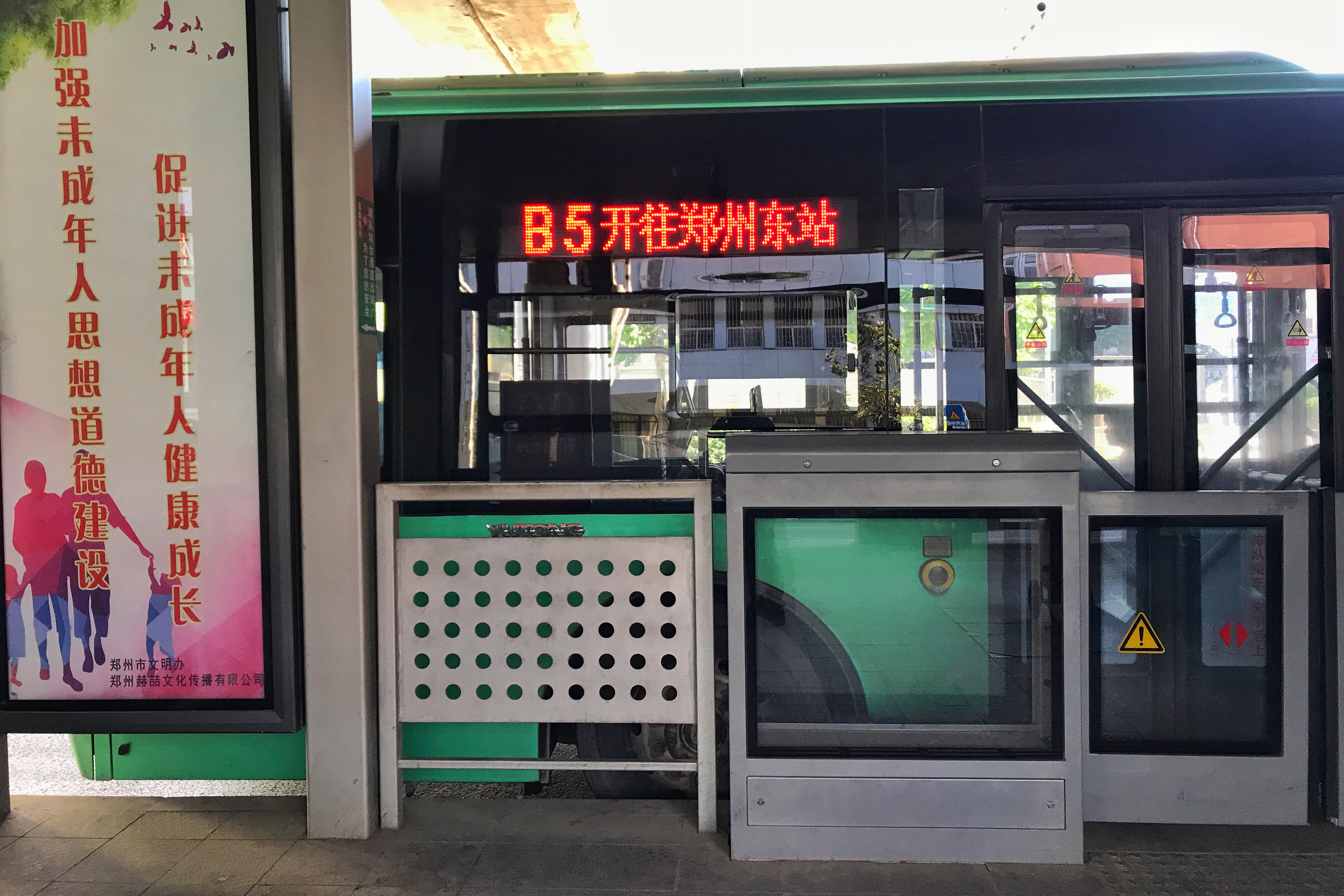

Overview
- System: Zhengzhou BRT
- Operator: Zhengzhou Bus Communication Corporation
- Vehicle: Yutong ZK6180CHEVNPG3 (18m); Yutong ZK6125CHEVNPG4 (12m)
- Livery: Green (18m articulated bus); Brown (12m bus)
- Status: Operational
- Began service: 2016

Route
- Locale: Zhengzhou, Henan, China
- Start: Longhai W. Road and West 3rd Ring Road
- End: Zhengzhou East railway station
- Length: 21 km (13 mi)
- Stops: 28
- Other routes: B501, B502

Service
- Level: Daily
- Frequency: Every 5-6 minutes
- Operates: 6:00 am – 9:30 pm

Zhengzhou BRT Route B5 is a bus rapid transit route operated by Zhengzhou Bus. Service started in 2016, it is the 4th route with dedicated bus lanes in Zhengzhou BRT.

== History ==
The first section of the route, opened on 26 January 2016, is from Longhai W. Road and West 3rd Ring Road to Longhai Road and Tongtai Road.

On 26 November 2016, the service was extended to Zhengzhou East railway station, and became the fastest bus service connecting west Zhengzhou and Zhengzhou East railway station. On the same day, two interval services of the route B501 and B502 were commenced, connecting Zhengzhou railway station to the route.

== Route ==
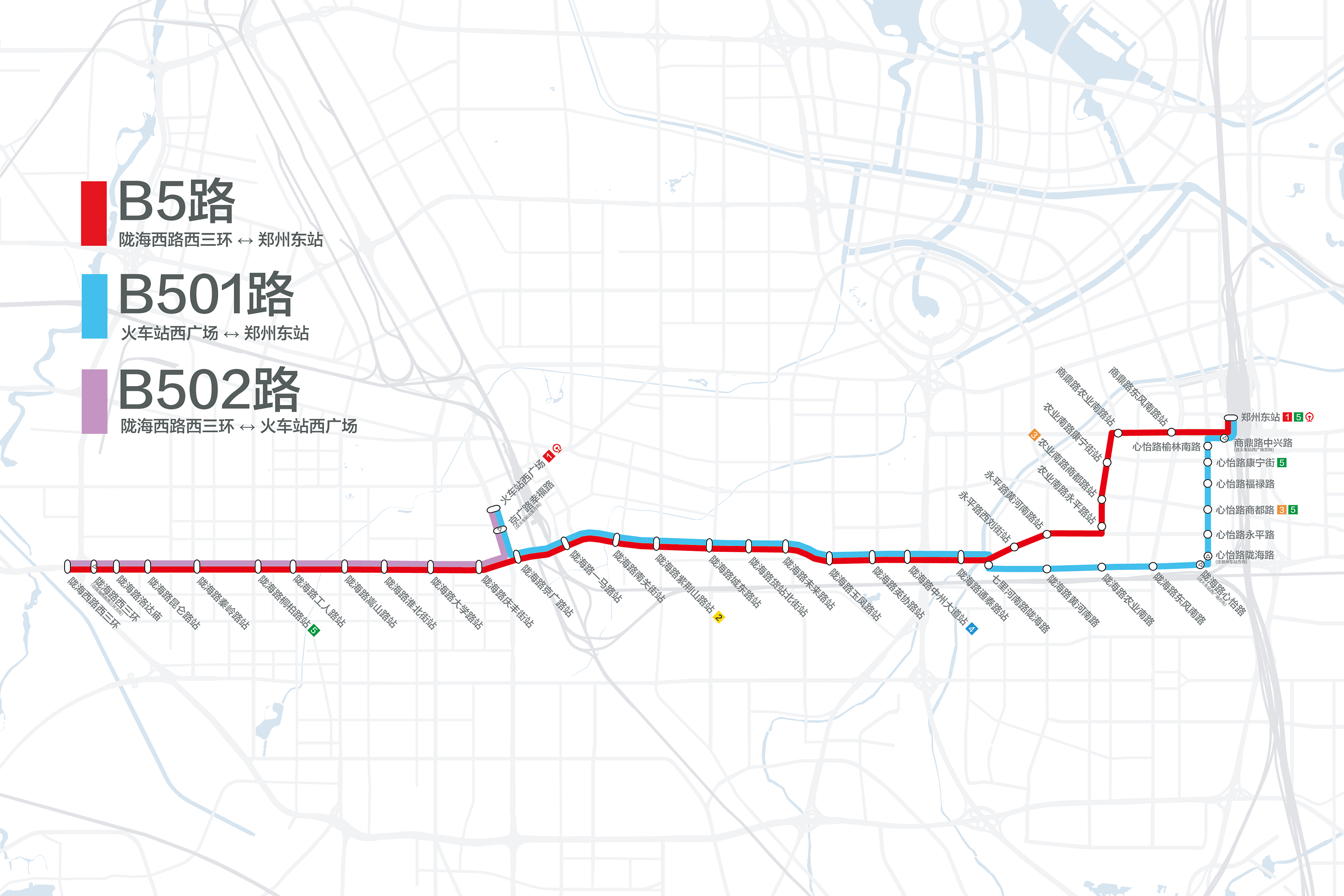
B5 Trunk Route

The route is operated between Longhai W. Road and West 3rd Ring Road bus terminus, which is under the interchange between Longhai Expressway and West 3rd Ring Road in western Zhengzhou, and Zhengzhou East railway station in Zhengdong New Area. The route runs mostly on Longhai Road, beneath the elevated Longhai Expressway.

== Branch routes ==
The route has a number of branch routes, which are free-interchangeable with the main route.

- Interval services:
  - B501: Zhengzhou railway station (West Plaza) ↔ Zhengzhou East railway station
  - B502: Zhengzhou railway station (West Plaza) ↔ Longhai W. Road and West 3rd Ring Road
- Feeder routes:
  - 1: Zhengzhou railway station (South Terminus) ↔ Huashan Road B/T
  - 13: Zhengzhou railway station (Yima Road) ↔ Suzhuang
  - 38: Zhengzhou railway station (Yima Road) ↔ Yaozhuang
  - 63: Shamen ↔ Hanghai Road and Qinling Road
  - 82: Zijingshan (Renmin Road) ↔ Huanggang Temple
  - 189: Dongjiancai ↔ Jingnan 6th Road and Jingkai 15th Avenue
  - 190: Longhai Road and Tongtai Road ↔ Henan Children's Hospital
  - 191: Longhai Road and Tongtai Road ↔ Jingkai 8th Avenue B/T
  - 216: Wulongkou ↔ Hanghai Road and Zhongzhou Avenue

== Fleet ==
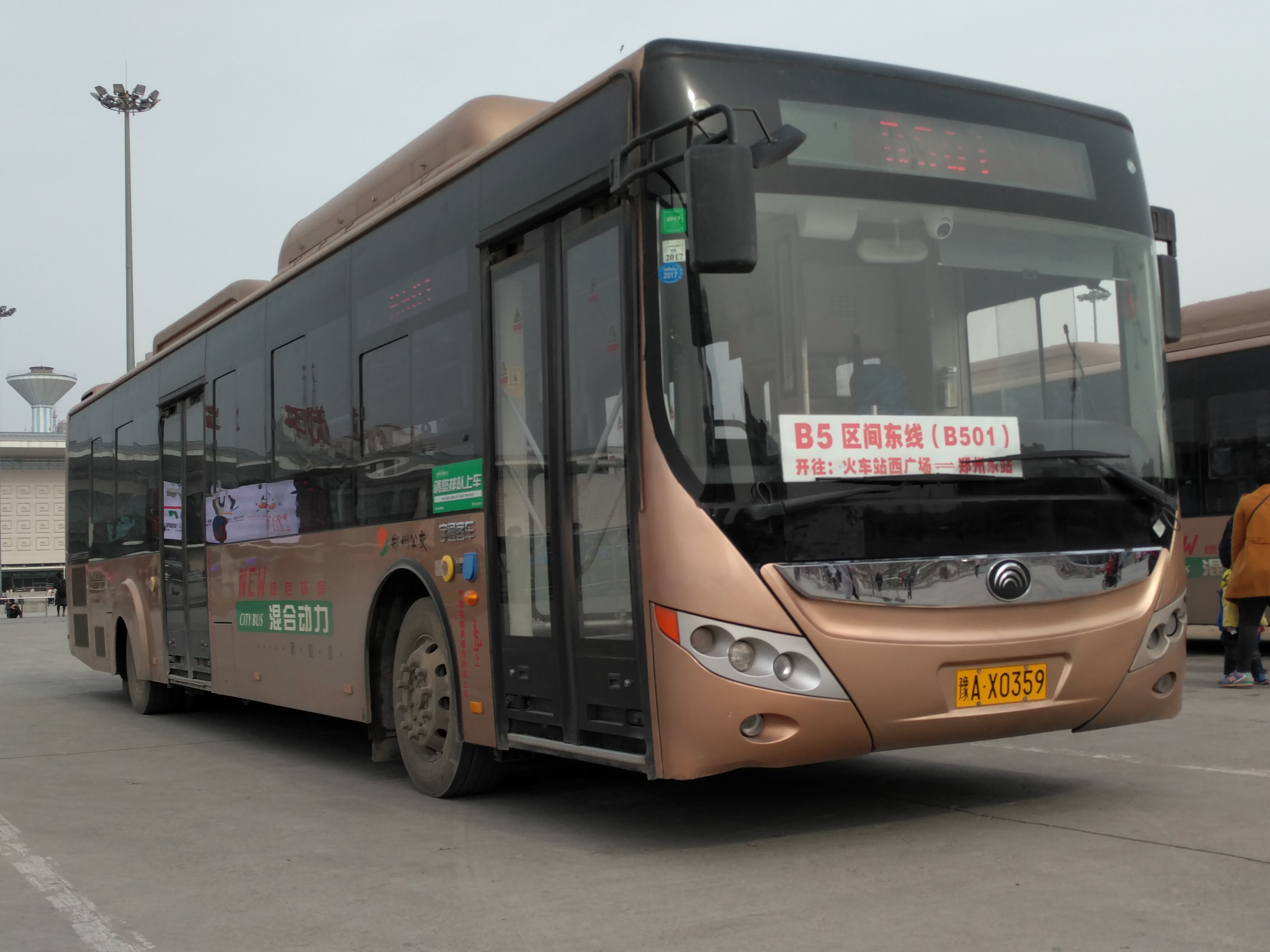
A Yutong ZK6125CHEVNPG4 on Route B501

- Yutong ZK6180CHEVNPG3 (used on B5 main-line)
- Yutong ZK6125CHEVNPG4 (used on B5 main-line as well as B501 and B502)
