= Zhongzhou Avenue =

Road in Zhengzhou, Henan, China

- 中州大道
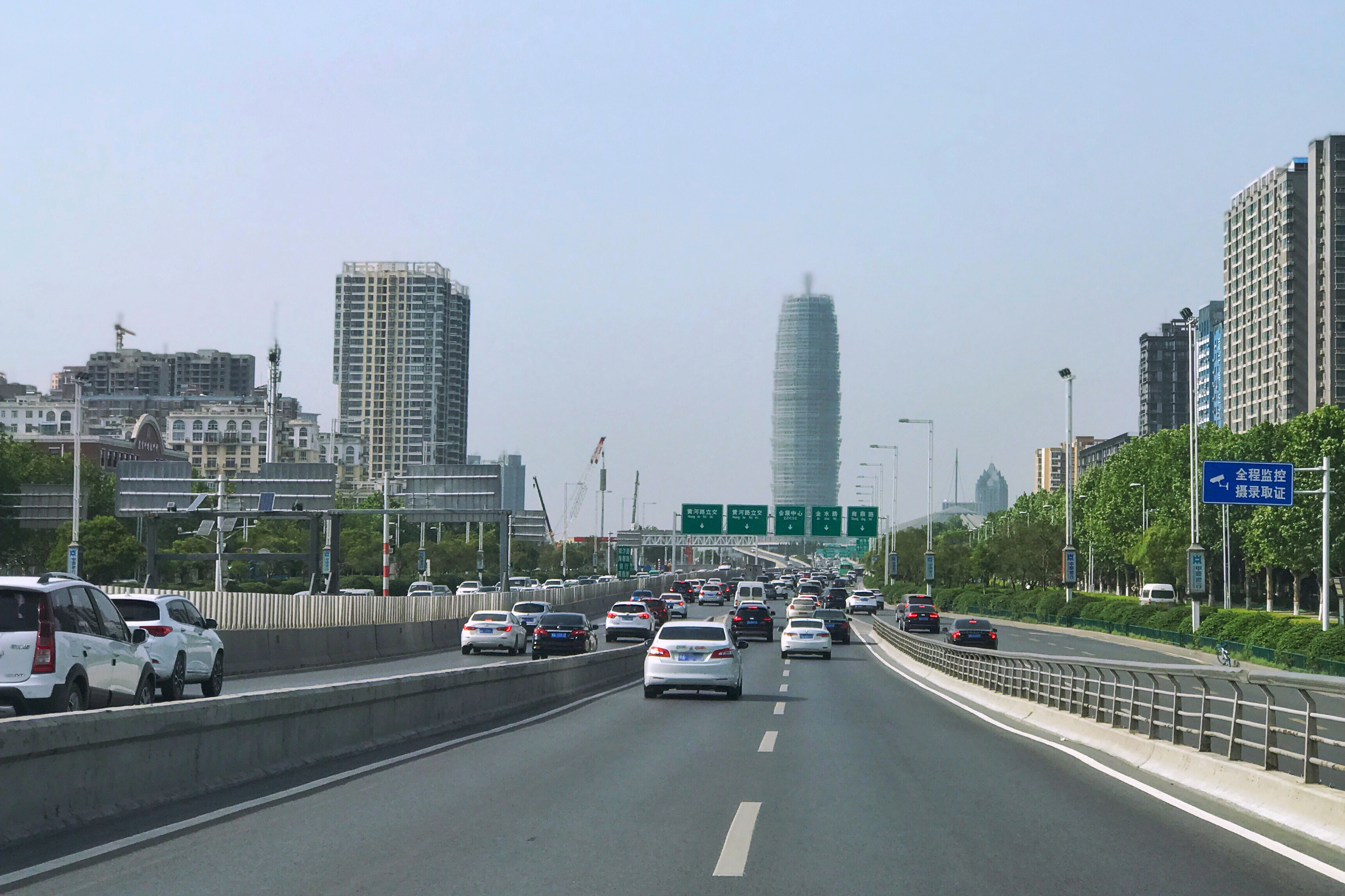
- Zhongzhou Avenue near Zhengdong New Area CBD

Route information
- Length: 26.95 km (16.75 mi)
- Existed: 1989–present

Major junctions
- North end: Huayuankou Interchange in Huiji District, Zhengzhou, Henan
- G30; North 3rd Ring Road; Nongye Expressway; Longhai Expressway; Henan S1; South 3rd Ring Road; Zhengxin Highway
- South end: South 4th Ring Road in Guancheng Hui District, Zhengzhou, Henan

Location
- Country: China
- Province: Henan
- Major cities: Zhengzhou

Highway system
- Transport in China; Expressways of Henan

The Zhongzhou Avenue (Chinese: 中州大道) is a 26.95-kilometre (16.75 mi) long road in Zhengzhou, Henan, China. As a boundary between old Zhengzhou urban area and Zhengdong New Area, the road is extremely important to Zhengzhou urban traffic. Part of the road (G30 Lianhuo Expressway–Zhengxin Highway section) is a limited access urban expressway and is among the busiest routes in Zhengzhou urban expressway system.

== History ==
This road was completed in 1989 as G107 highway Zhengzhou section. When completed, the road was in the eastern suburban area of Zhengzhou. With the city development, especially after the establishment of the Zhengdong New Area in 2003, the eastern part of Zhengzhou has been growing rapidly and the road began to serve as an urban road as well. As a result, the road became very congested. To relieve traffic congestion, the Zhengzhou section of G107 highway was moved to the east in 2004. The former section was often referred to as "Old 107" and began to serve only as an urban road.

In 2006, the former G107 highway Zhengzhou section was officially renamed as Zhongzhou Avenue.

The road has undergone many widening and reformation work over its life. The elevation project of the northern and southern sections of the road was finished in 2014 and the interchanges with Longhai Expressway and Nongye Expressway were completed in 2016, making the road fully connected to other expressways in Zhengzhou's double rings and "井" shaped urban expressway plan.

== Exit list ==
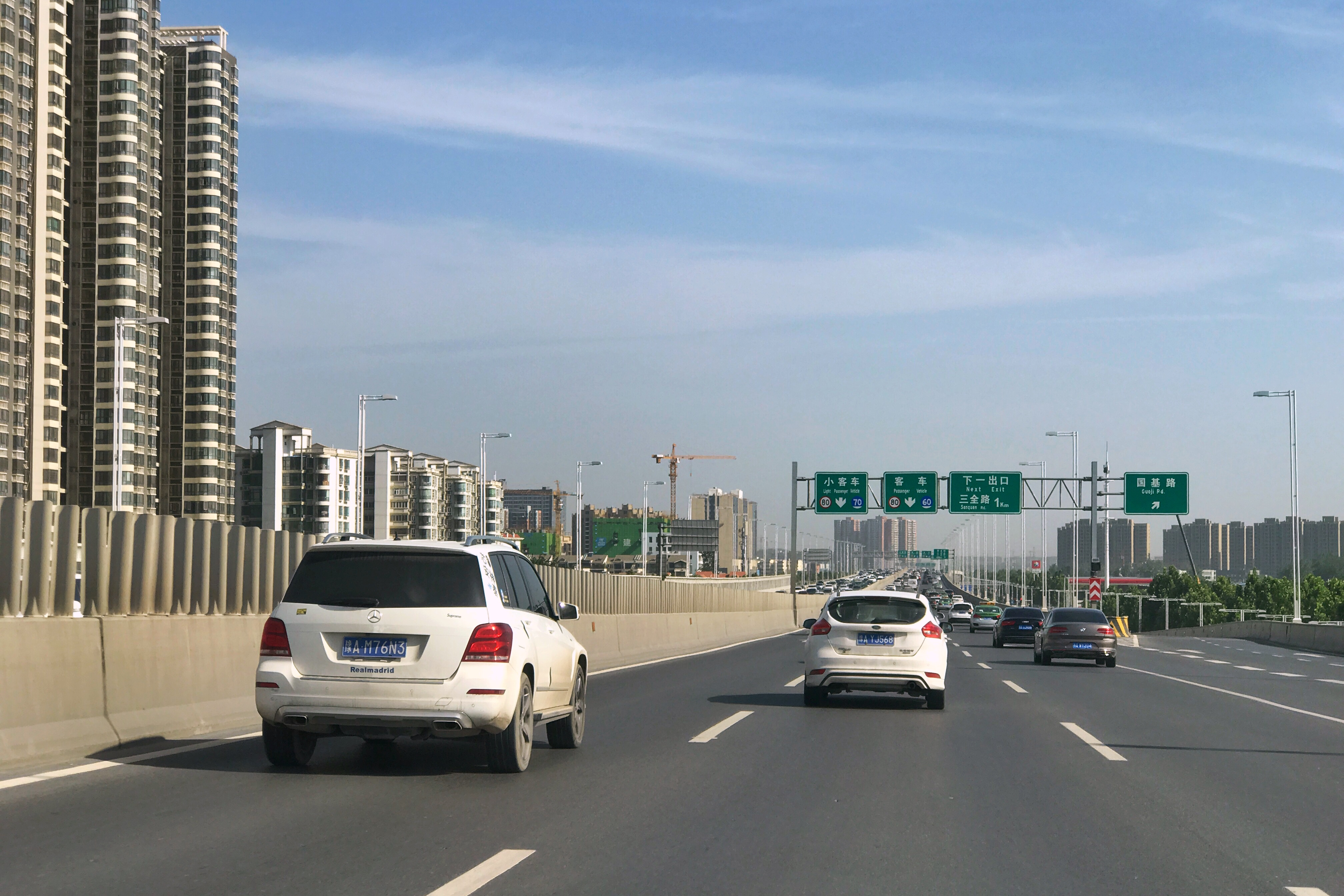
Zhongzhou Avenue near Guiji Rd. exit

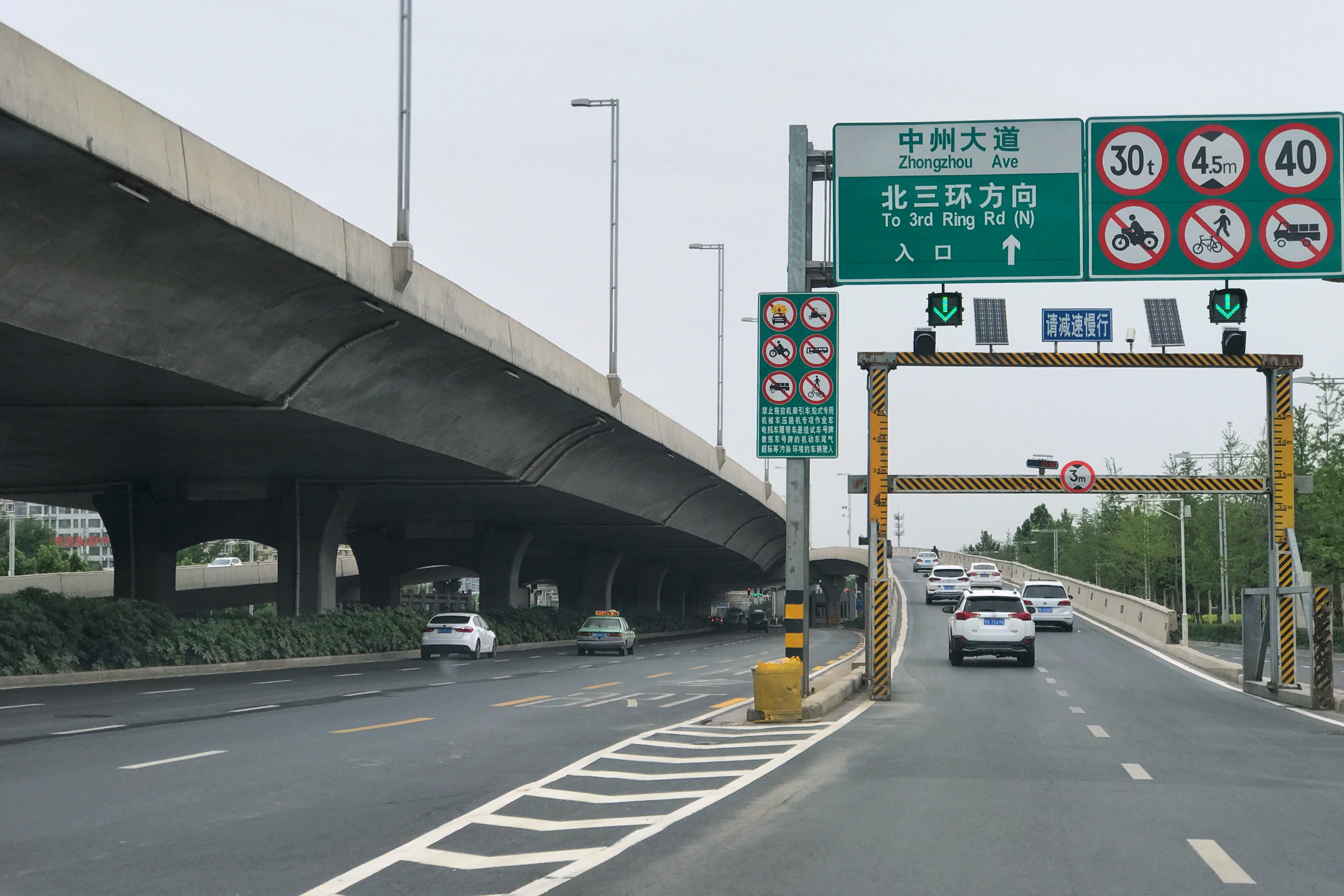
An entrance of Zhongzhou Avenue near Longhu Middle Ring Road

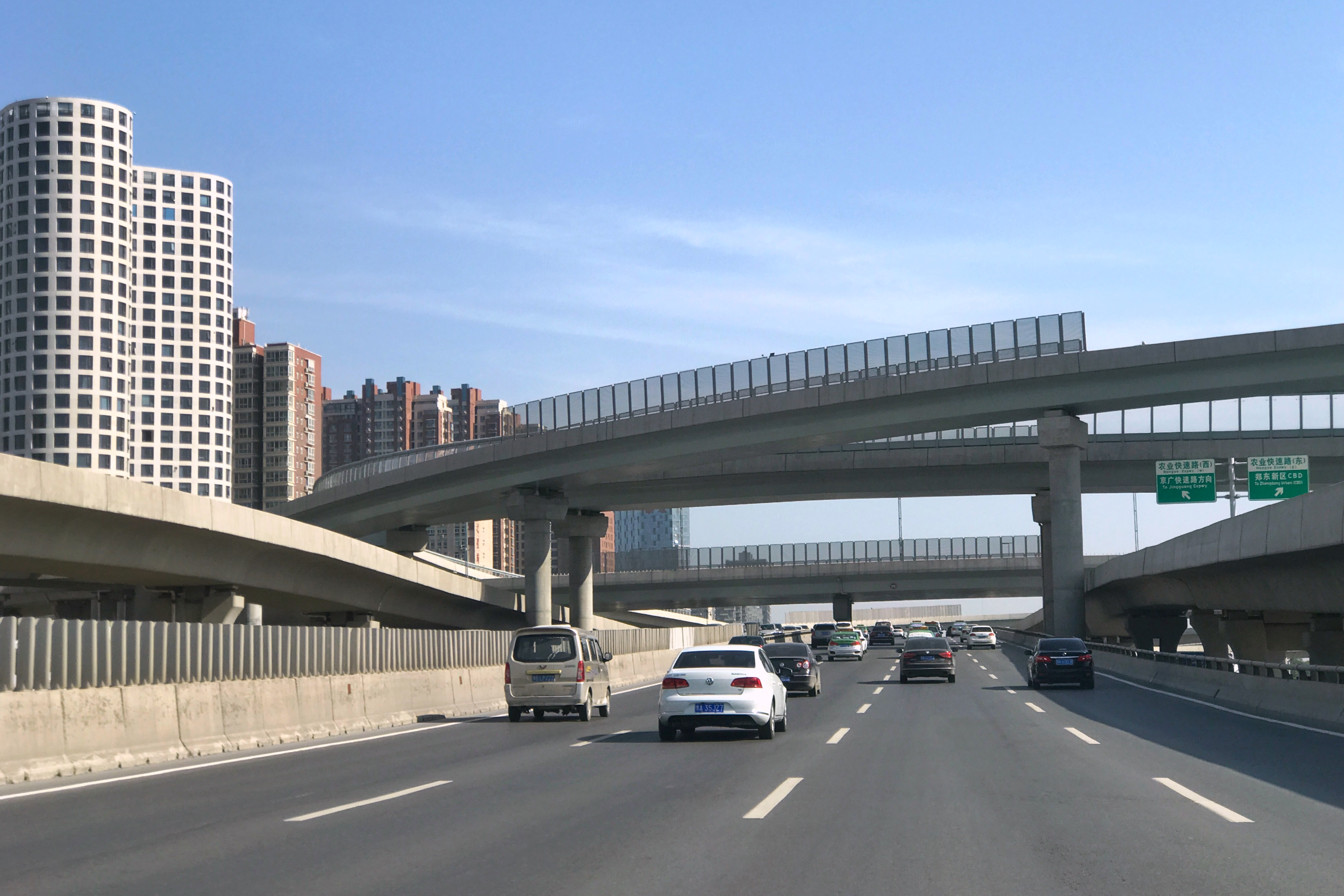
Zhongzhou Avenue and Nongye Expressway interchange

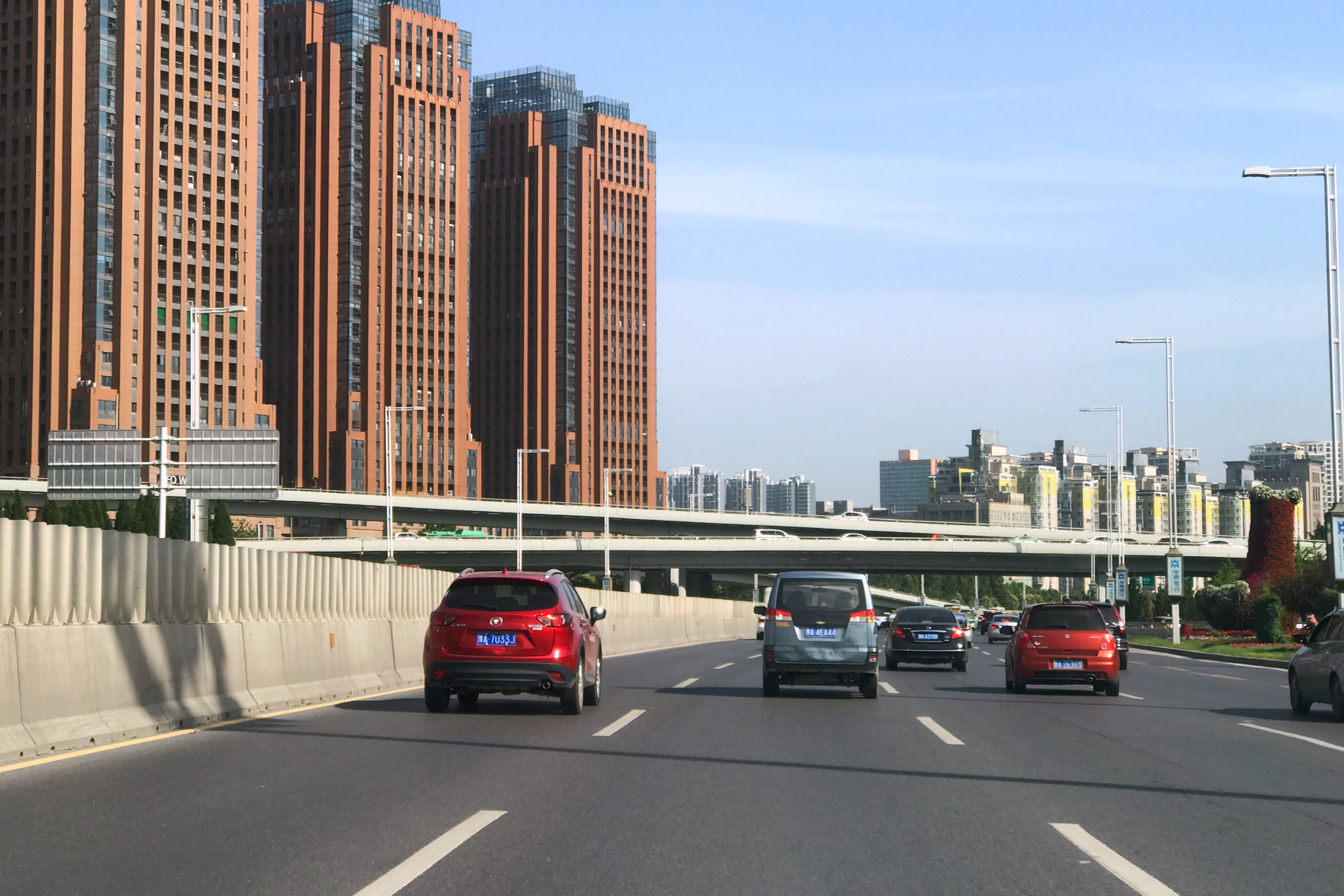
Zhongzhou Avenue Huanghe Interchange

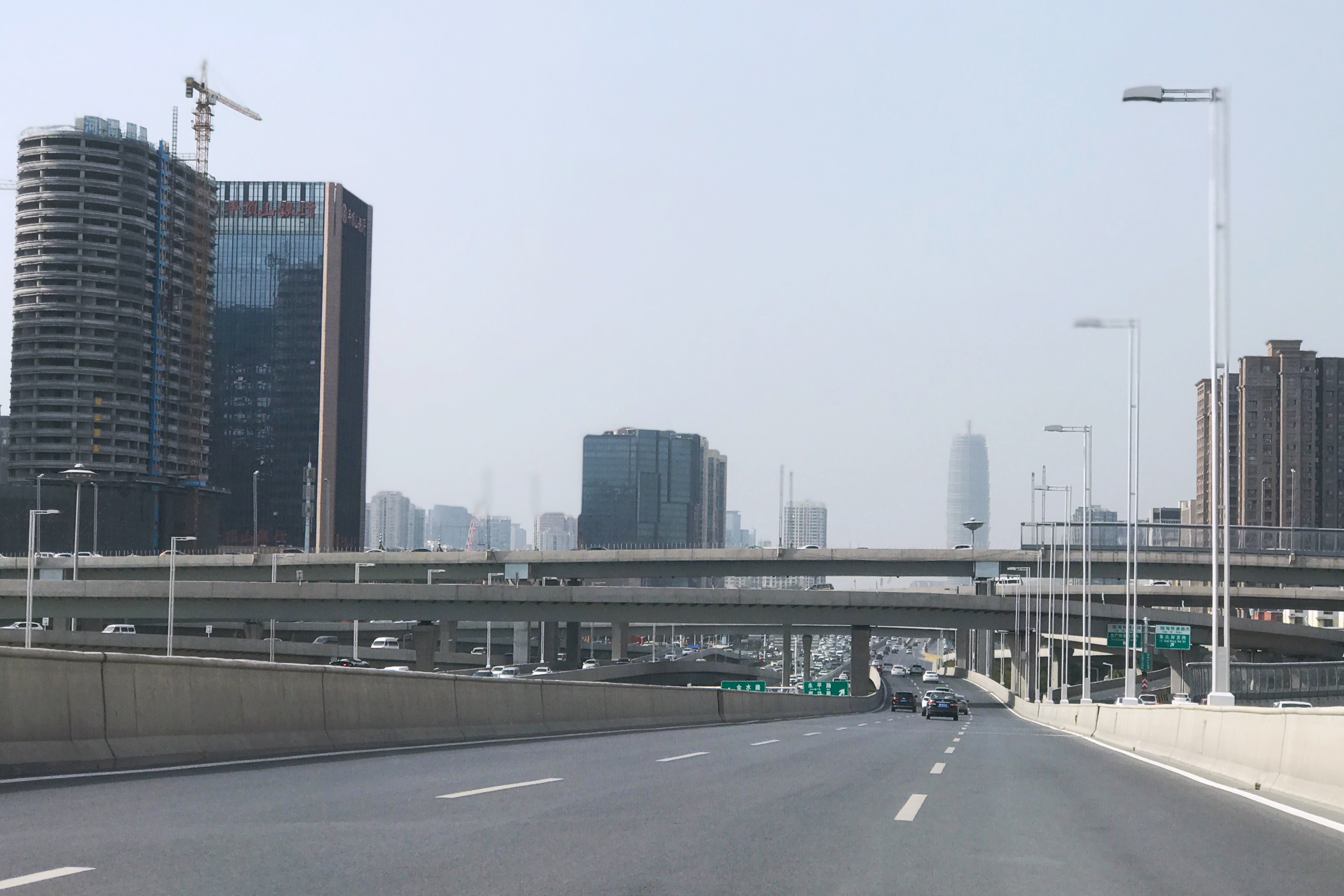
Zhongzhou Avenue and Longhai Expressway interchange

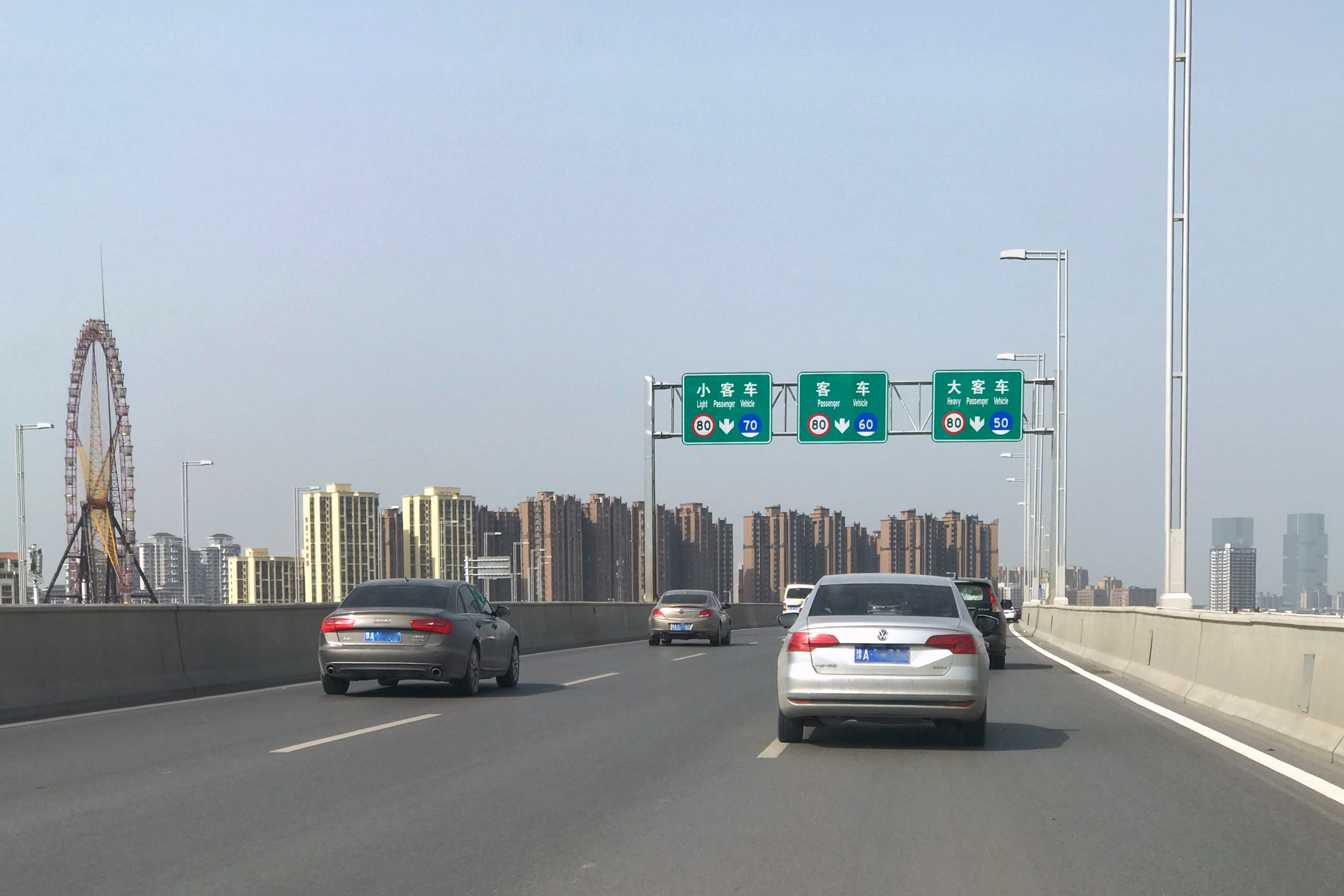
Zhongzhou Avenue near Hanghai E. Road

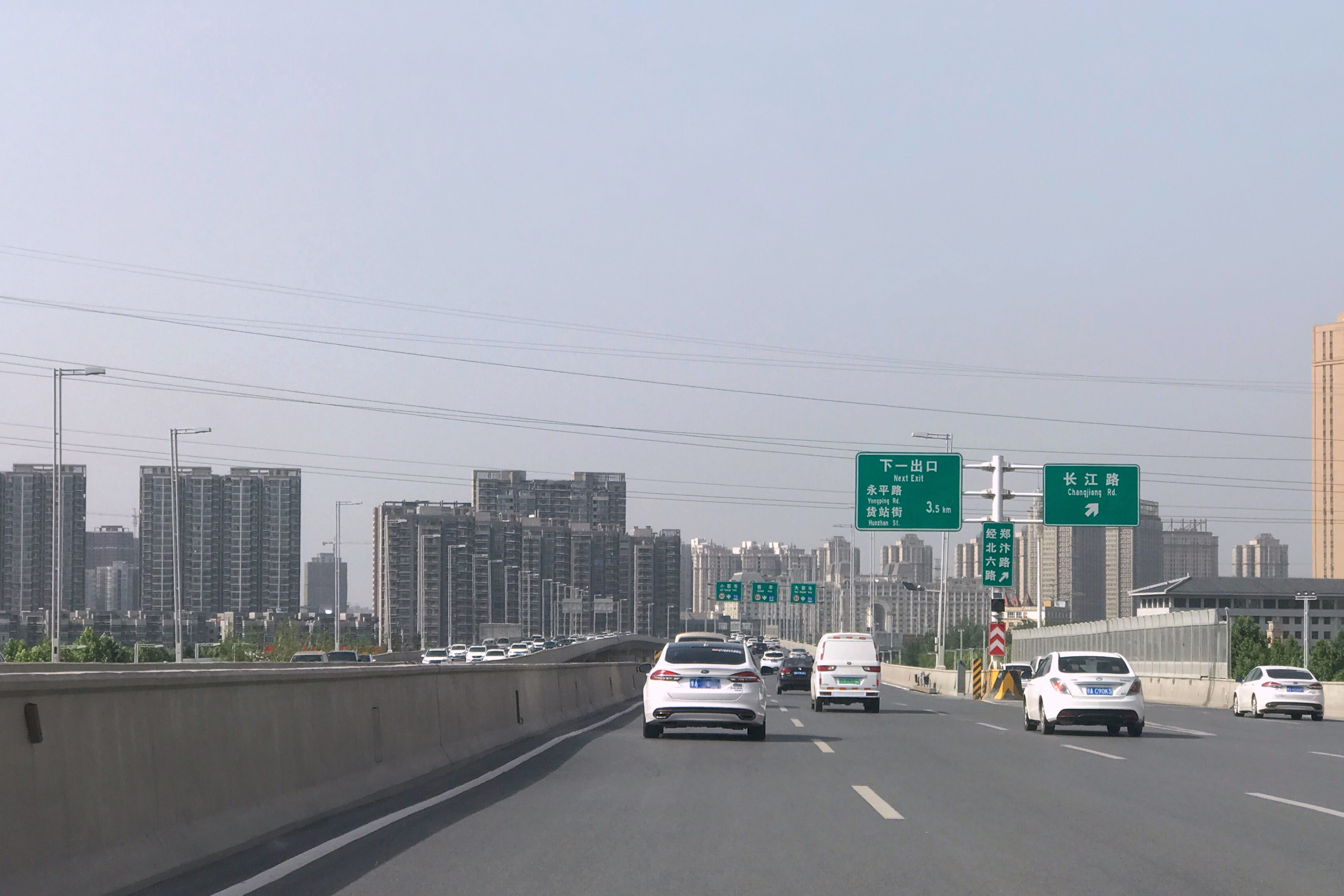
Zhongzhou Avenue near Changjiang Road exit

From north to south:

Location	km	mi	Exit	Name	Destinations	Notes
Zhongzhou Avenue
Continues north as G107 towards Xinxiang
Huiji District	0	0		Huayuankou Interchange	Dahe Road; Huayuan N. Road; Zhengzhou Yellow River Highway Bridge	Northern terminus
Huiji District				Yingbin Rd.	Yingbin Road	Light-controlled crossing
Huiji District				Yingcai St.	Yingcai Street	Southbound exit and entrance only
Jinshui District				Shaoyuan	Y001 Road	Light-controlled crossing
Jinshui District				Yangjin Rd.	Yangjin Road	Light-controlled crossing
Jinshui District				Lianhuo Expwy	G30 – Kaifeng, Luoyang	
Jinshui District				Sanquan Rd.	Sanquan Road	
Jinshui District				Guoji Rd.	Guoji Road	Northbound exit only
Jinshui District				3rd Ring (N) Rd.	North 3rd Ring Road	
Jinshui District				Longhu Middle Ring Rd.	Longhu Middle Ring Road; Dongfeng Road; Dongfeng E. Road; Chenxu Road	
Jinshui District				Nongye Expwy	Nongye Expressway; Nongye E. Road	
Jinshui District				Huanghe Interchange	Huanghe Road; Huanghe E. Road; Weilai Road	
Jinshui District				Weisi Rd.	Weisi Road	Southbound exit and entrance only
Jinshui District				Shangwu West 3rd St.	Shangwu West 3rd Street	Northbound exit and entrance only
Jinshui District				Shangwu West 5th St.	Shangwu West 5th Street	Northbound exit and entrance only
Jinshui District				Minhang Rd.	Minhang Road	Southbound exit and entrance only
Jinshui District				Shangwu West 7th St.	Shangwu West 7th Street	Northbound exit and entrance only
Jinshui District				Jinshui Interchange	Jinshui Road; Jinshui E. Road; Zhengdong New Area CBD; ZZICEC	
Jinshui District				Fuyuan Rd.	Fuyuan Road	Southbound exit and entrance only
Jinshui District				Shangding Rd.	Shangding Road	Northbound exit and entrance only
Jinshui District				Shangdu Rd.	Shangdu Road; Zhengbian Road	
Jinshui District				Longhai Expwy	Longhai Expressway; Henan S1 – Zhengzhou Xinzheng International Airport	
Guancheng Hui District				Hanghai Rd.	Hanghai E. Road	Southbound exit and entrance, northbound entrance
Guancheng Hui District				Changjiang Rd.	Changjiang E. Road	Northbound exit
Guancheng Hui District				3rd Ring (S) Rd.	Sorth 3rd Ring Road	
Guancheng Hui District				Shibalihe Interchange	Zhengxin Highway towards Xinzheng; Zhengxin Road; Yutong Road	
Guancheng Hui District				4th Rong (S) Rd.	South 4th Ring Road	Southern terminus
Closed/former; Concurrency terminus; HOV only; Incomplete access; Tolled; Route transition; Unopened
