= Architecture of the Song dynasty =

11th- to 13th-century Chinese architecture

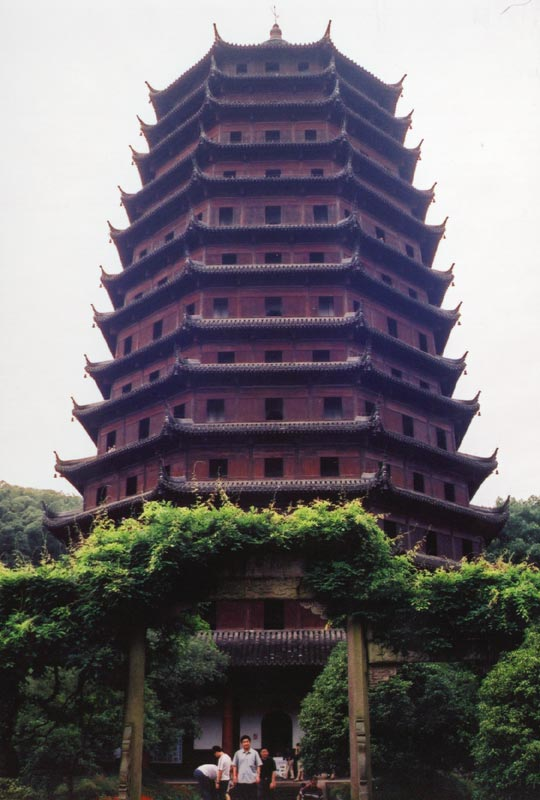
The Liuhe Pagoda, or Six Harmonies Pagoda, in Hangzhou, 60 m (197 ft) in height, erected in 1156 and completed in 1165 AD

The architecture of the Song dynasty encompasses structures built in China from 960 to 1279, and includes towering Buddhist pagodas, temple halls, pavilions, gardens, stone and wooden bridges, lavish tombs, and extravagant palaces. Song dynasty architects inherited ideas, methods, and traditions from previous dynasties such as the Tang and Later Zhou, though with stylistic changes, especially with the growth of the economy and blurring of residential and commercial areas in urban districts. Although many timber structures built during this era no longer survive, much is known about the layout of Kaifeng (Bianjing), capital city of the Northern Song (960–1127), and Hangzhou (Lin'an), capital city of the Southern Song (1127–1279), due to art and literature. Wooden buildings were the most prevalent, but stone, brick, and rammed earth structures were also built.

Architectural knowledge in China had been passed down orally for thousands of years, usually from craftsman fathers to their sons. There were also government agencies and schools for construction, building, and engineering. The professions of architect, master craftsman, carpenter, and structural engineer did not have the high status of the Confucian scholar-officials. However, some statesmen were commissioned by the emperor to oversee construction projects, such as Su Song for his astronomical clocktower erected in Kaifeng. Scholar-officials such as Ouyang Xiu designed and built their own private gardens, and the written works of architects such as Yu Hao were appreciated by some Chinese literati. Song architectural trends not only impacted later Chinese dynasties but also influenced Japanese architecture.

Literary works on Chinese architecture existed beforehand, but architectural writing blossomed during the Song dynasty, maturing into a more professional form that described dimensions and working materials in a concise, organized manner. In addition to ruins and structures still standing intact, depictions in Song artwork, architectural drawings, and illustrations in published books all aid modern historians in understanding the architecture of the period. The Song dynasty's building manuals aided not only the various private workshops, but also the craftsmen employed by the central government. The Yingzao Fashi, published in 1103, remains the earliest Chinese building manual to survive in full, while literary works such as the Dongjing Meng Hua Lu, published in 1147, provide clues about urban landscapes and construction details.

== Materials and components ==
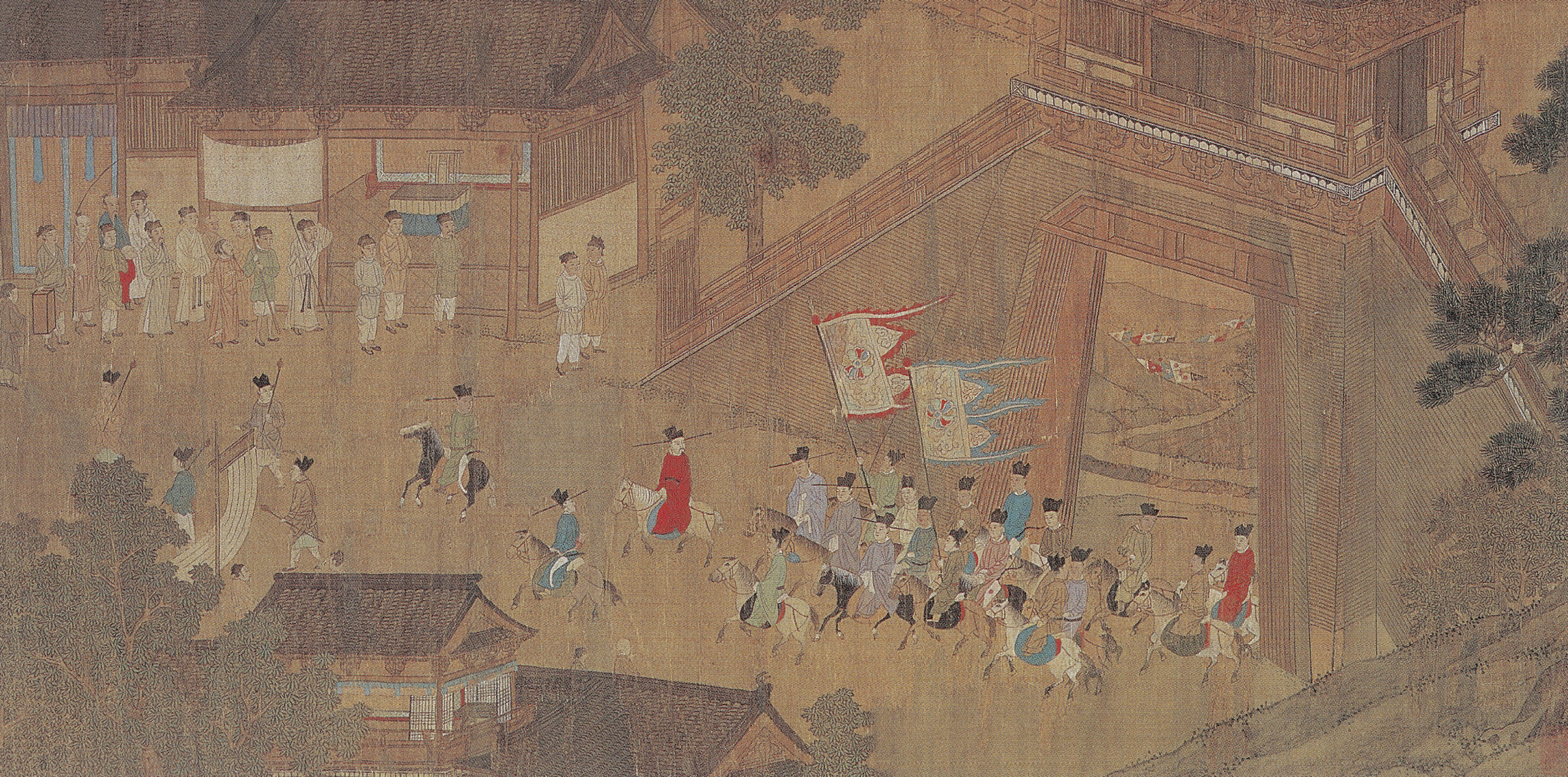
Auspicious Omens by Li Song, depicting cavalrymen riding through a gate along a city wall

Traditional Chinese architecture encompasses mainly timber structures held up by elaborate dougong brackets, and therefore timber buildings of the Song dynasty (960–1279) shared similar features and components of those built by the contemporary Liao dynasty (916–1125) and Jin dynasty (1115–1234). During the Song period, timber architecture was broadly divided into two main categories: the palace type and hall type. These two types of buildings had fundamental differences in terms of structural support, with palace type buildings containing a roof layer and separate dougong layer, and hall type buildings compensating for a lack of a separate dougong layer by utilizing a panjian rectangular wooden bar to maintain longitudinal stiffness and structural integrity.

Timber structures were also designed to accommodate different climatic conditions. The hot, humid climate of the Jiangnan region in southern China prompted Song era engineers to replace heavy rammed earth walls and fixed lattice windows with detachable wooden lattice windows for better regulation of ventilation and insulation. Southern Song architects in the Jiangnan region preferred not only wooden column platforms but also rammed earth platforms lined with stone and brick to elevate timber buildings for better lighting, ventilation, vantage points, and aesthetic appeal. Construction materials also varied by building type. Song era structures such as bridges were built of either wood or stone, and pagoda towers were constructed using wood or brick. The elevated rammed earth platform or terrace lined with brick and stone and crowned with a wooden structure had existed since the Zhou dynasty (1046–256 BC); it was used for various functions such as feasting and holding diplomatic meetings, and served as partial inspiration for the later pagoda in Chinese Buddhist architecture.

== City and palace ==
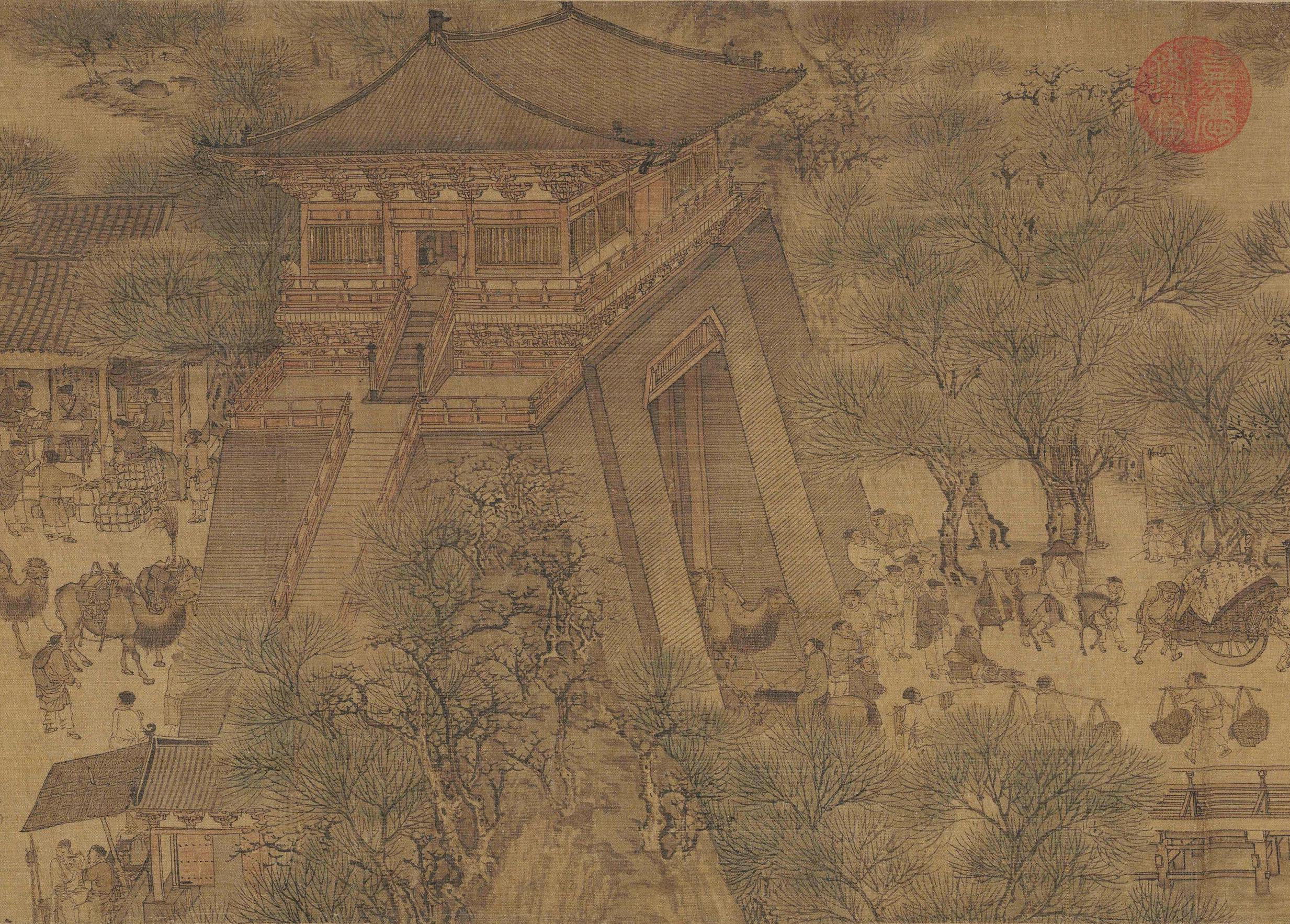
A city gate in Kaifeng (Bianjing) depicted in a detail from Along the River During the Qingming Festival, painted by Zhang Zeduan shortly before the fall of Kaifeng to the Jurchen Jin dynasty in 1127

While some structures built during the Song era remain intact or in ruins, many of the buildings and much of the construction materials from this era have disappeared or eroded over time. Chinese pavilions, restaurants, and wine shops built in urban areas during the Song period no longer exist, and can only be studied with the aid of primary sources such as government edicts, literature, and artworks. For instance, Zhang Zeduan's large painting Along the River During the Qingming Festival, which depicts various buildings, bridges, vehicles, and people in Kaifeng, serves as one of the major sources for understanding Song architecture before the Jurchen Jin siege and occupation of the capital city in 1127. Various texts from the 12th and 13th centuries also describe the layout of Kaifeng and other cities. (Note: According to the Dongjing Meng Hua Lu by Meng Yuanlao, the city of Dongjing (Bianjing, later Kaifeng) had three enclosures during the Song period: the outer city wall, the inner city wall, and the palace at the center. The inner city was rectangular, with three doors on each side. The palace enclosure was also rectangular, with a watch tower on each of the four corners. It had four main gates: Xihua Gate to the west, Donghua Gate to the east, Gongchen Gate to the north, and Xuande Gate, also known as Duan Gate or Xuandelou, at the south. Xuande Gate had five-paneled doors, painted red and decorated with gold tacks; its walls were lavishly decorated with dragon, phoenix and floating-cloud patterns to match the carved beams, painted rafters and glazed-tile roof. Running southward from Xuande Gate was the Imperial Boulevard, about two hundred paces wide, with the Imperial Corridors on either side. Merchants opened shops in the Corridors until 1112, when they were banned. Two rows of black fencing were placed at the center of the boulevard as a barrier to pedestrians and carriages. Along the inner sides of the fences ran the brick-lined Imperial Water Furrows, filled with lotus. About 400 m (1,300 ft) south from Xuande Gate, the Bian River intercepted the Imperial Boulevard, which crossed it over the stone Zhou Bridge, balustraded and flat-decked. This design of a boulevard with a stone bridge crossing a river was later imitated in the Forbidden City. During spring and summer, mingled peach, plum, pear and apricot trees adorned the banks of the Bian with a variety of flowers.) From these sources it is known where precise city gates, government palaces, markets, and streets were located in Kaifeng and Lin'an (Hangzhou), the capital of the Southern Song dynasty.

During the Tang dynasty (618–907), urban areas in China were strictly divided into distinct residential and commercial wards divided by city walls, and had to follow strict building codes that forbade multistory pavilions to overlook private homes in residential and market areas. The Later Zhou dynasty (951–960) deviated from this approach, allowing the construction of various lavish multistory buildings catering to merchants, a model of city management inherited by the Northern Song dynasty. Emperor Renzong of Song issued an edict in 1036 forbidding private homes not used as market shops or pavilions from using elaborate construction methods such as caisson ceilings, but overall the Song government had a far more relaxed attitude in regulating civilian structures than the Tang. Due to intensely growing commercialism during the Song period, shops could now line streets in residential areas and did not have to be situated behind precinct walls. Large wine pavilions grew in popularity, to the point that entire streets in Kaifeng were named after them. Song dynasty palaces and temples resembled Tang precedents but gradually became more complex in terms of construction, details, and multistory parts.

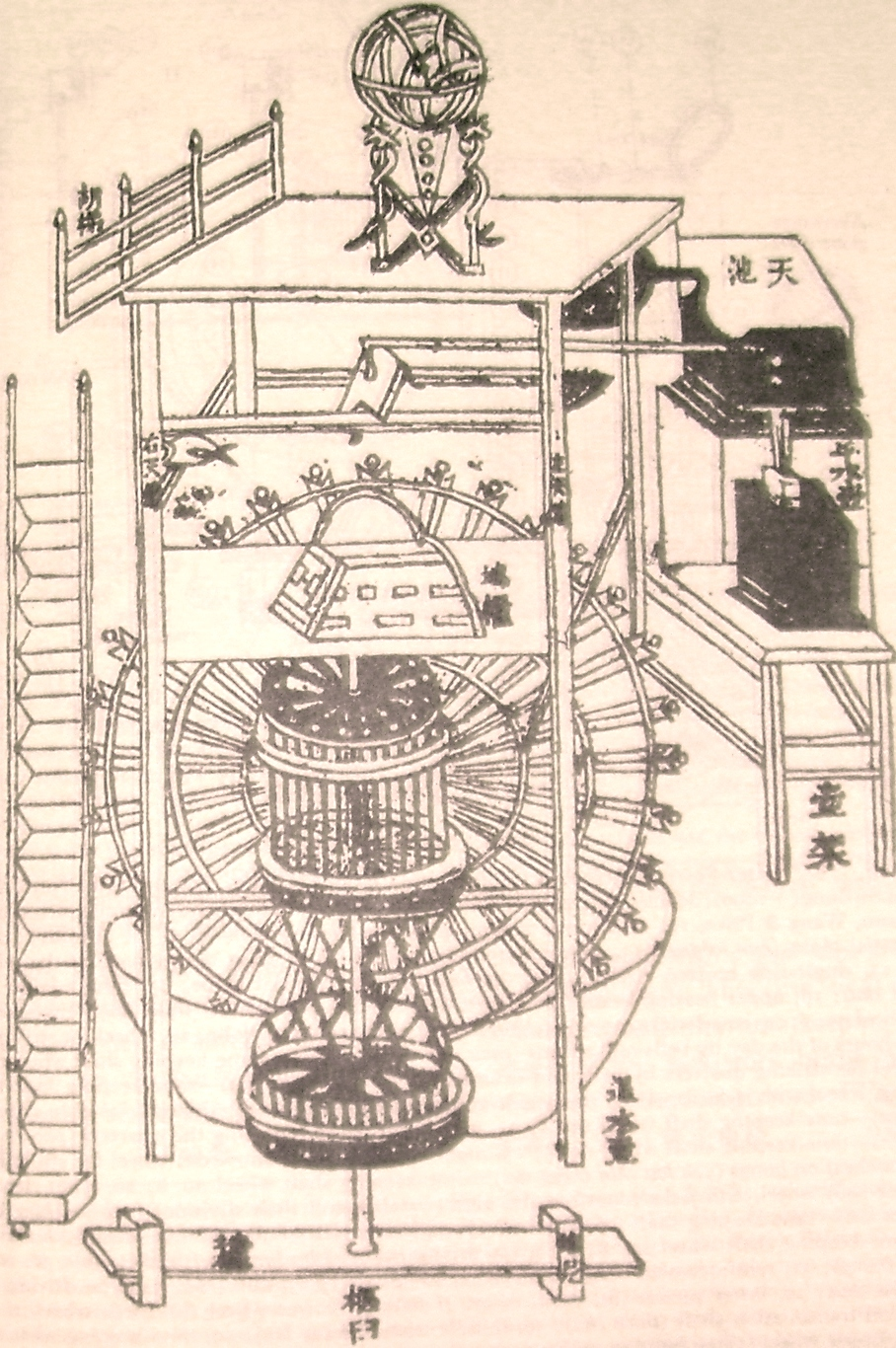
Interior design of Su Song's clocktower, which contained an astronomical clock and automatically rotating armillary sphere, from his horological book of 1092

Emperor Zhezong of Song commissioned the statesman and scientist Su Song to build a large astronomical clocktower in Kaifeng. It was completed in 1094 and had a waterwheel-powered armillary sphere along with mechanically operated mannequin musicians who sounded the hours, but was dismantled after the 1127 siege by Jin forces. Although his tower no longer exists, Su Song described it in thorough detail in a horological treatise with illustrations.

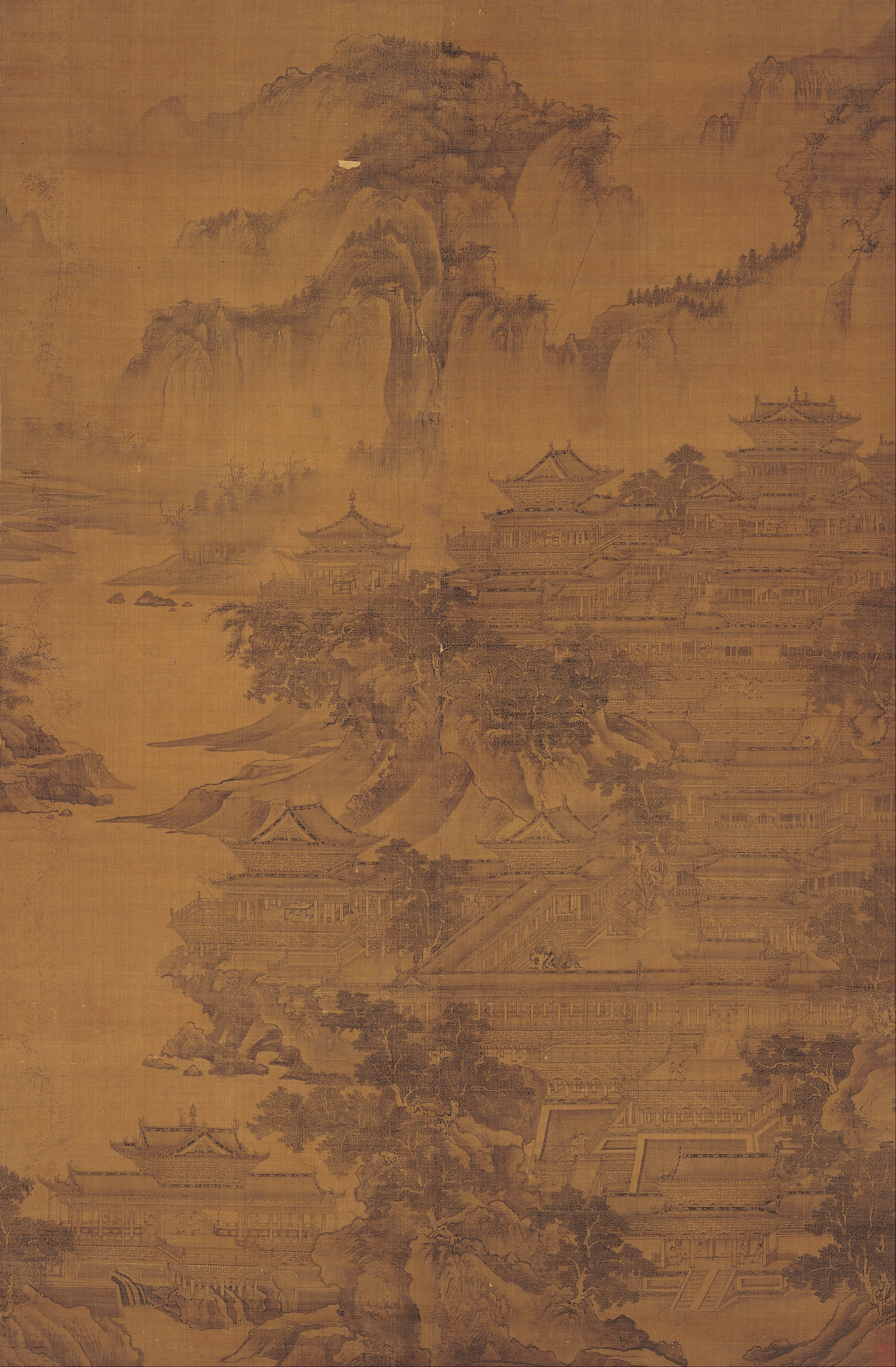
Summer Palace of Emperor Ming by Guo Zhongshu (929–977)

A Palace by Zhao Boju (1120–1182)

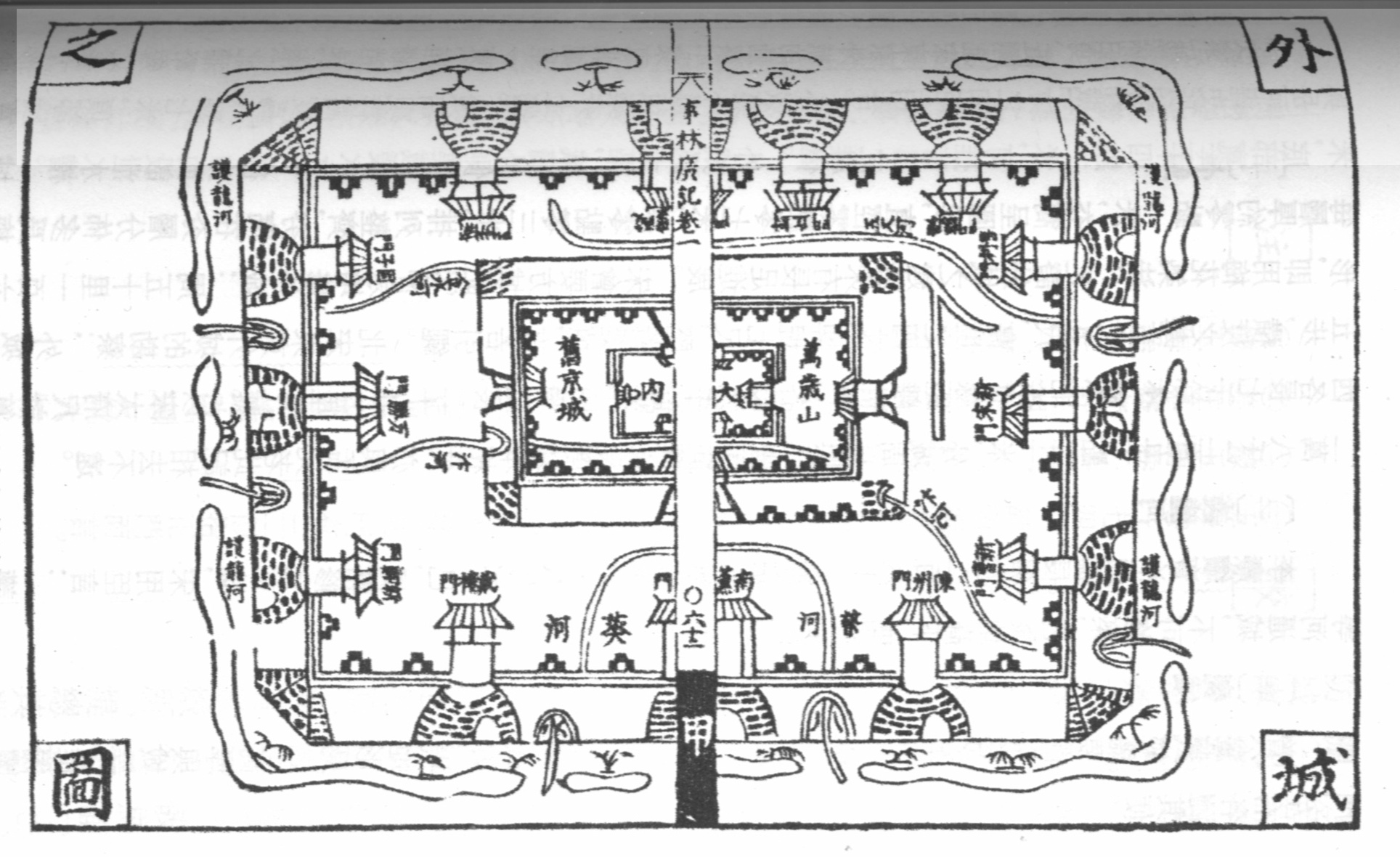
Outer city of Bianjing, map from Shilin Guangji by Chen Yuanjing

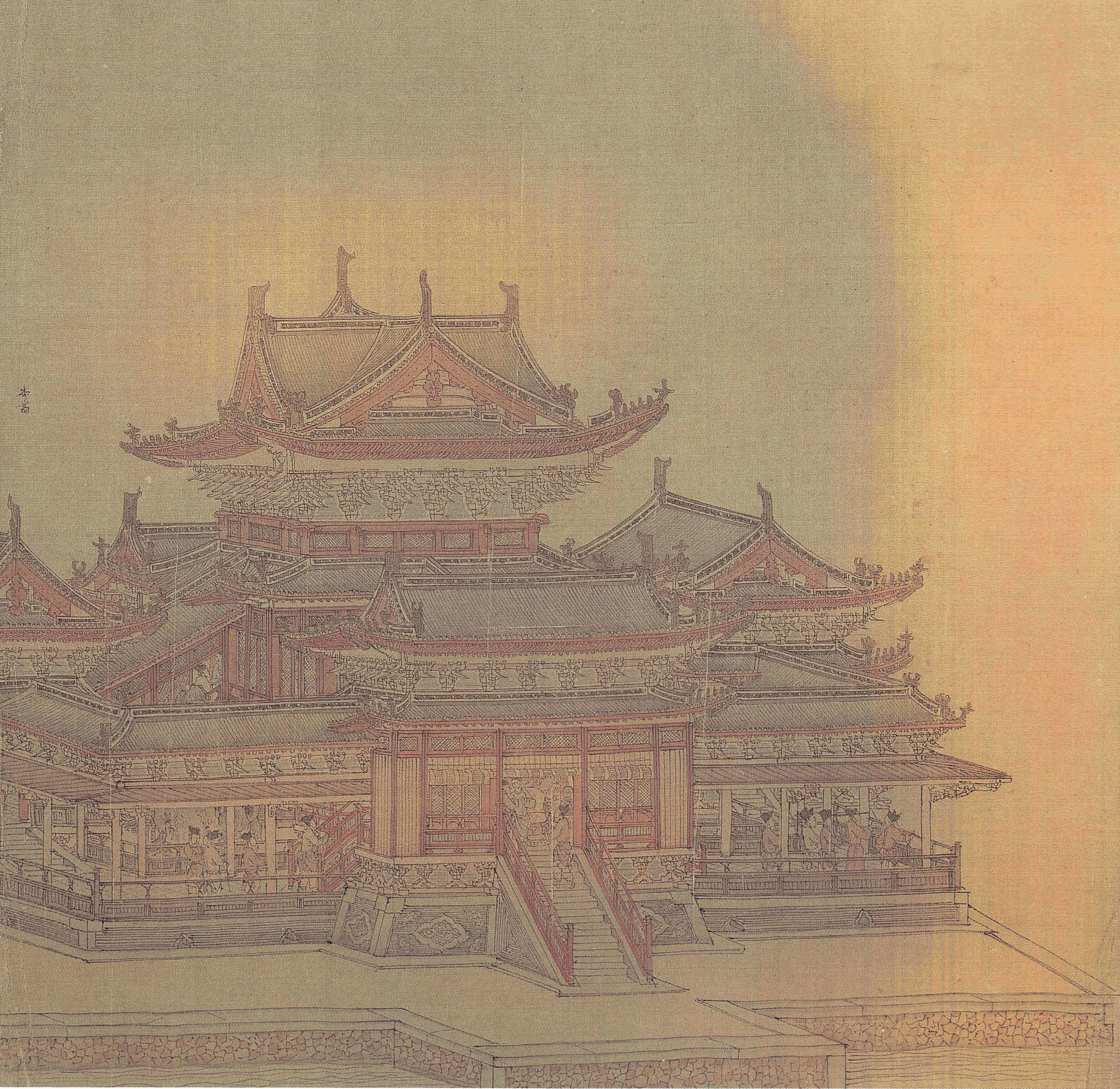
Retiring from Court by Li Song (1190–1264)

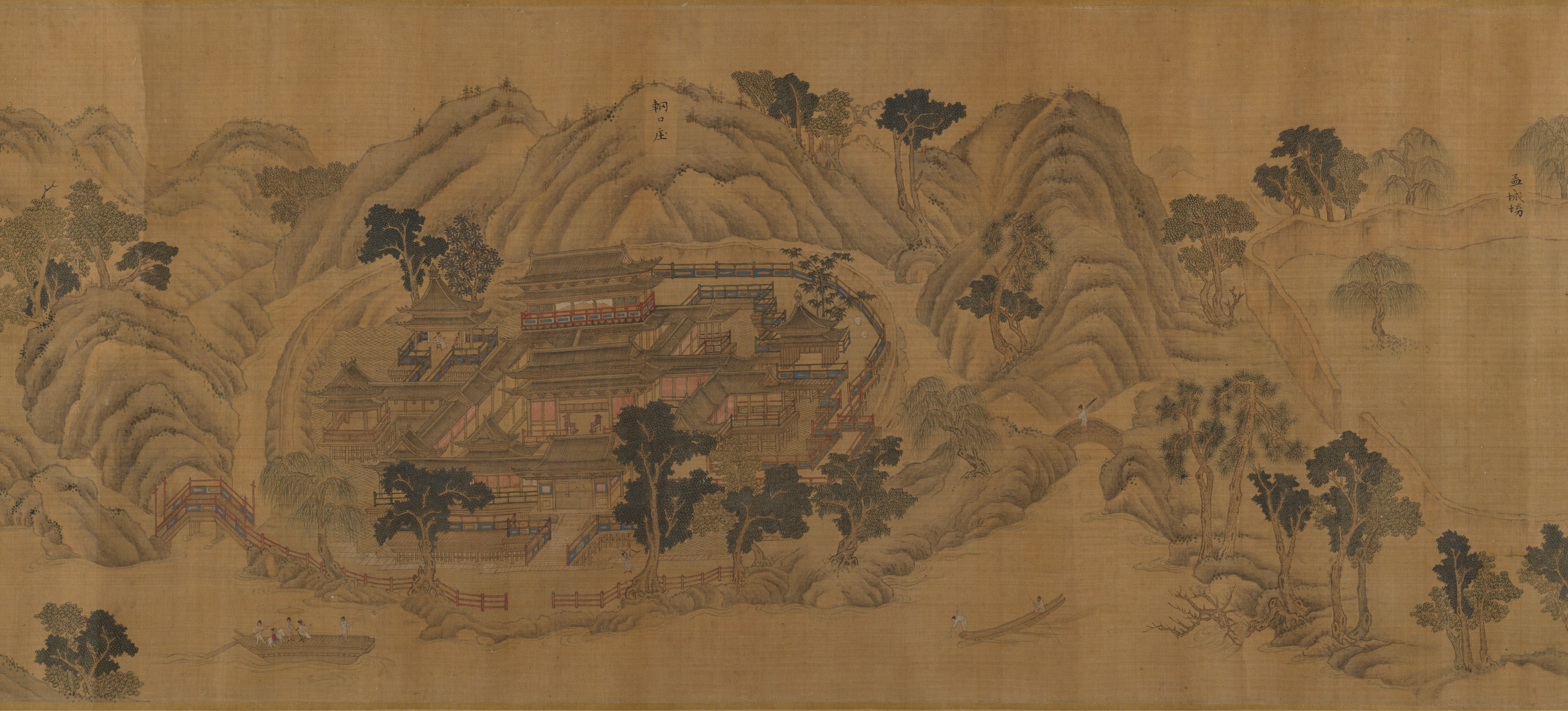
Wangchuan villa by Guo Zhongshu (929–977)

== Buddhist pagodas ==
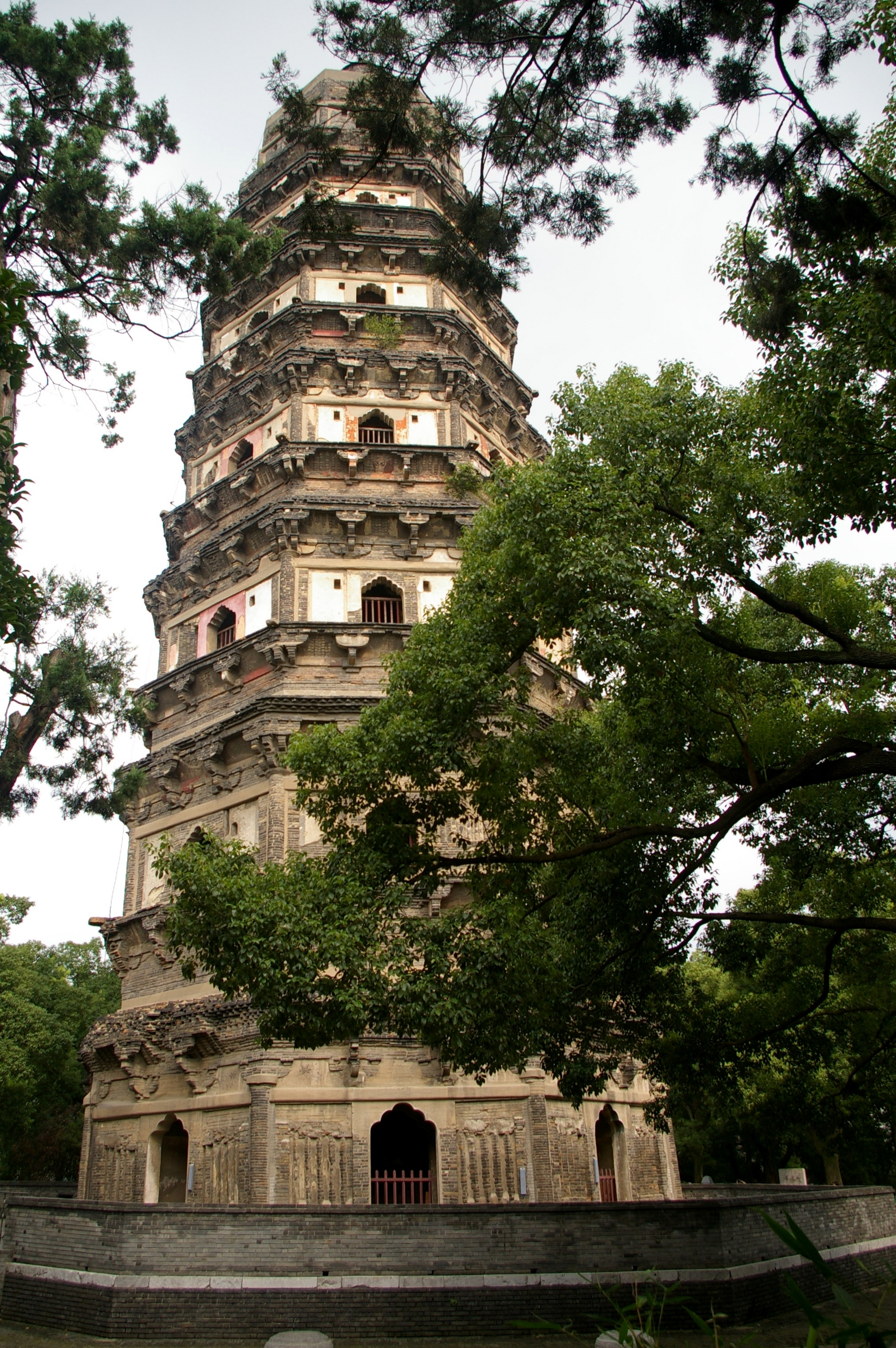
The Yunyan Pagoda, 47 m (154 ft) in height, built in 961 AD.

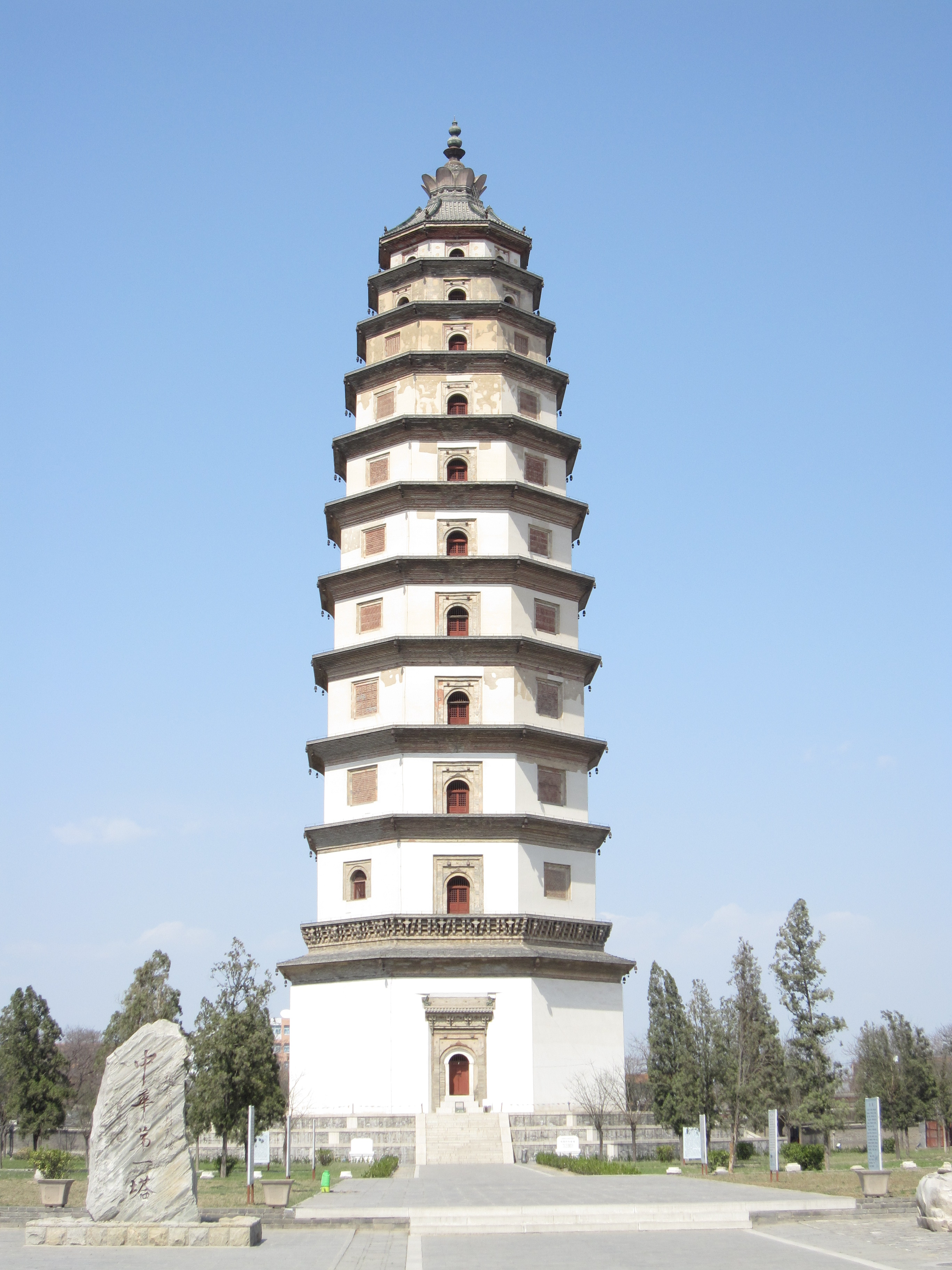
The Liaodi Pagoda of Hebei, 84 m (276 ft) in height, built in 1055 during the Northern Song

After the Han dynasty (202 BC – 220 AD), the idea of the Buddhist stupa entered Chinese culture from India as a means to house scriptural sutras. During the Southern and Northern Dynasties period, the distinctive Chinese pagoda was developed, its predecessors being the tall watchtowers and towering residential apartments of the Han dynasty (as inferred from models in Han-era tombs). During the Sui (581–618) and Tang (618–907) periods, pagodas were developed from purely wooden structures to use articulated stone and brick, which could more easily survive fires caused by lightning or arson and were less susceptible to decay. The earliest brick pagoda that remains extant is the Songyue Pagoda, built in 523 by the Northern Wei, and a typical example of a Tang-era stone pagoda is the Giant Wild Goose Pagoda, constructed in 652. Pagodas during the Song and Liao dynasties had improved masonry designs, survive in greater numbers than those of previous dynasties, and Song structures are distributed mainly south of the Yellow River.

Roughly sixty Buddhist pagoda towers built in China during the Song, Liao, and Jin dynasties still survive. Tall Chinese pagodas were often built in the countryside rather than within a city's walls, largely to avoid competition with the cosmic-imperial authority embodied in the cities' drum-towers and gate-towers. However, the Song capital city Kaifeng was filled with pagoda towers, the tallest of which stood 360 ft (100 m) in height and was built by Yu Hao to house relics from Mauryan emperor Ashoka of India. Pagoda towers built during this period usually contain six or eight sides, are often made of brick or wood, and the brick pagodas are usually built in an imitative style of timber architecture (replicating bracket structures).

The Song period featured true cast-iron pagodas, such as the Iron Pagoda of Yuquan Temple (Jade Springs Temple), Dangyang, Hubei Province. Built in 1061, it incorporates 53,848 kg (118,715 lb) of cast iron and stands 21.28 m (69.8 ft) tall. The Liuhe Pagoda, or Six Harmonies Pagoda, is another example of Song-era pagoda architecture. It is located in the Southern Song capital of Hangzhou, in Zhejiang Province, at the foot of Yuelun Hill facing the Qiantang River. Although the original was destroyed in 1121, the current tower was erected in 1156 and fully restored by 1165. It stands 59.89 m (196.5 ft) tall, and was constructed from a red brick frame with 13 stages of wooden eaves. Because of its size, the pagoda served as a permanent lighthouse to aid sailors at night. The Liaodi Pagoda of Dingzhou, Hebei, built in 1055 and standing at a height of 84 meters (276 ft), was used as a religious structure but also as a watchtower for military observation of forces belonging to the Khitan Liao dynasty.

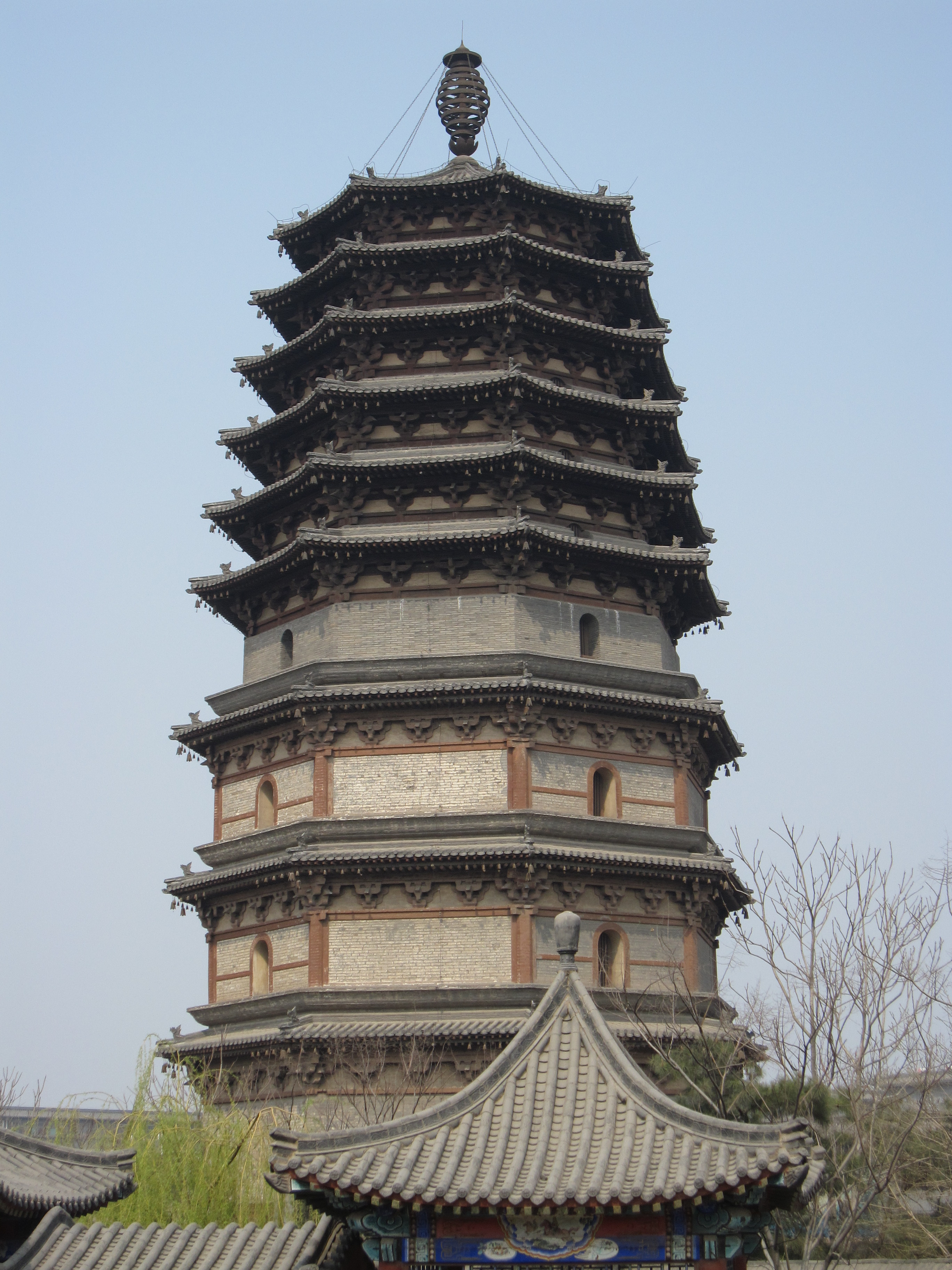
Lingxiao Pagoda in Zhengding, Hebei Province, is a 42-meter (138 ft) tall wood-and-brick hybrid pagoda. It was built in 1045.

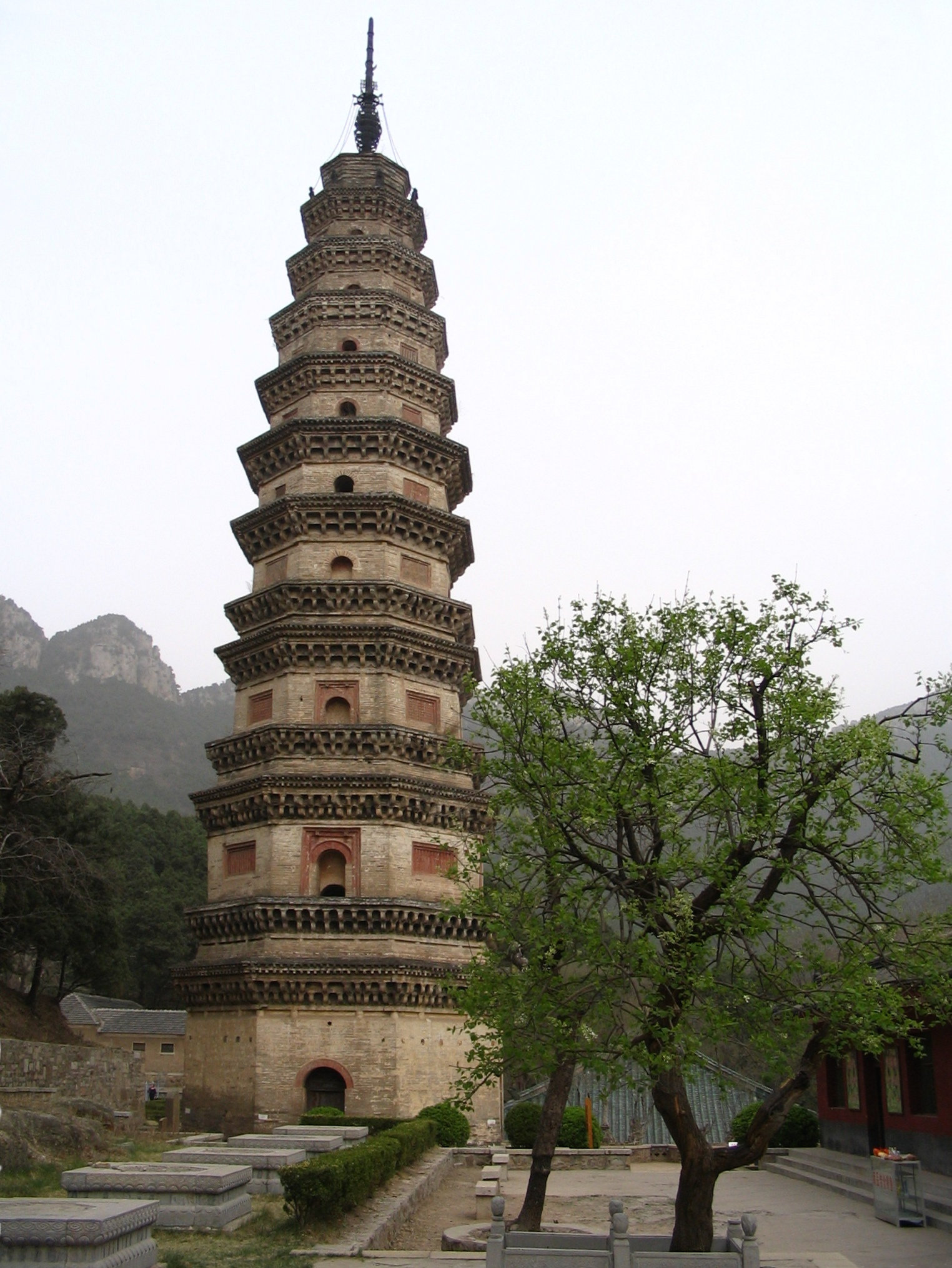
Pizhi Pagoda of Lingyan Temple, Shandong, 54 m (177 ft) in height, built in 1063.

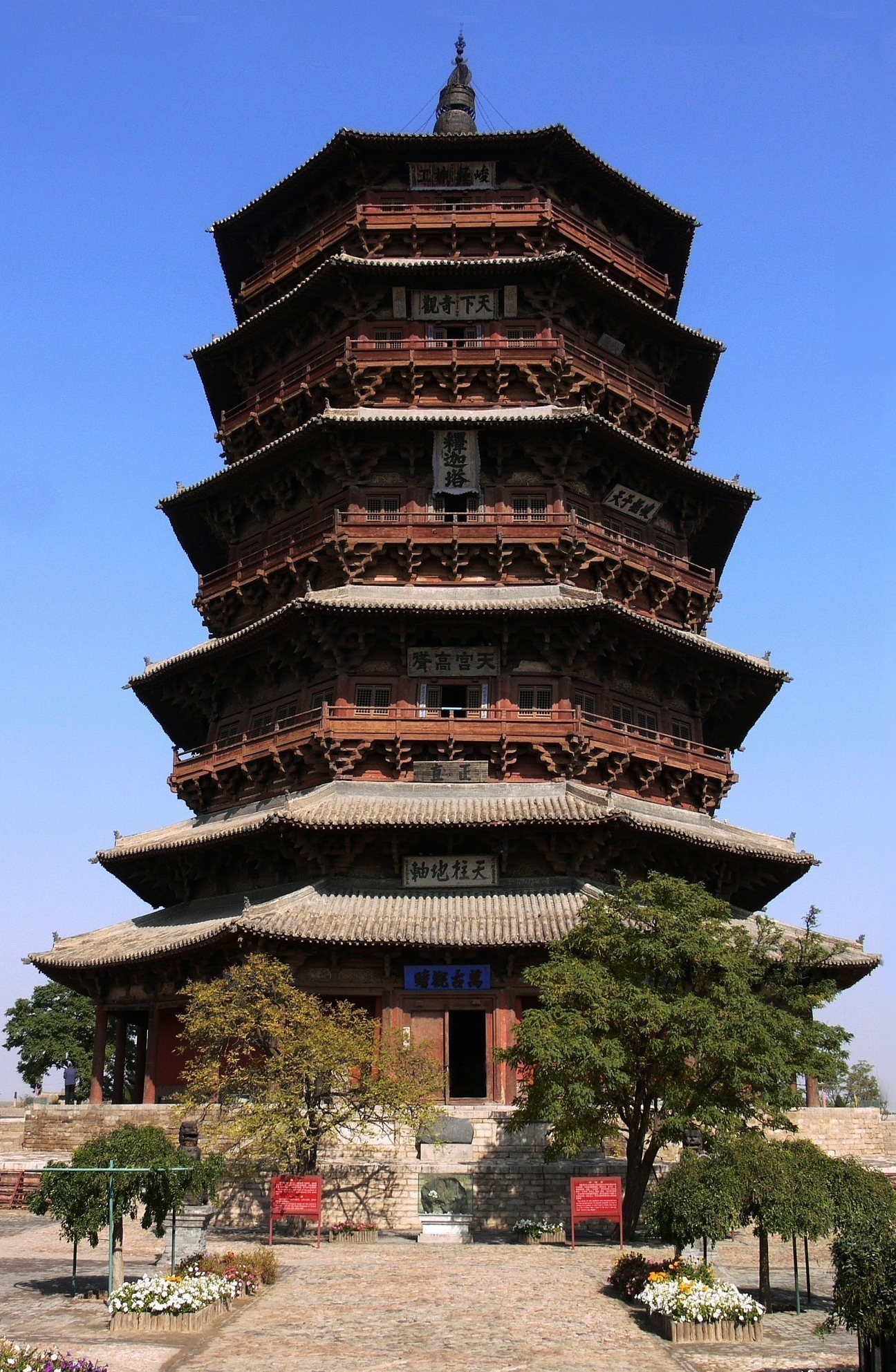
The wooden dougong-constructed Pagoda of Fogong Temple, located in Shanxi, 67 m (220 ft) in height, built in 1056 during the Liao dynasty

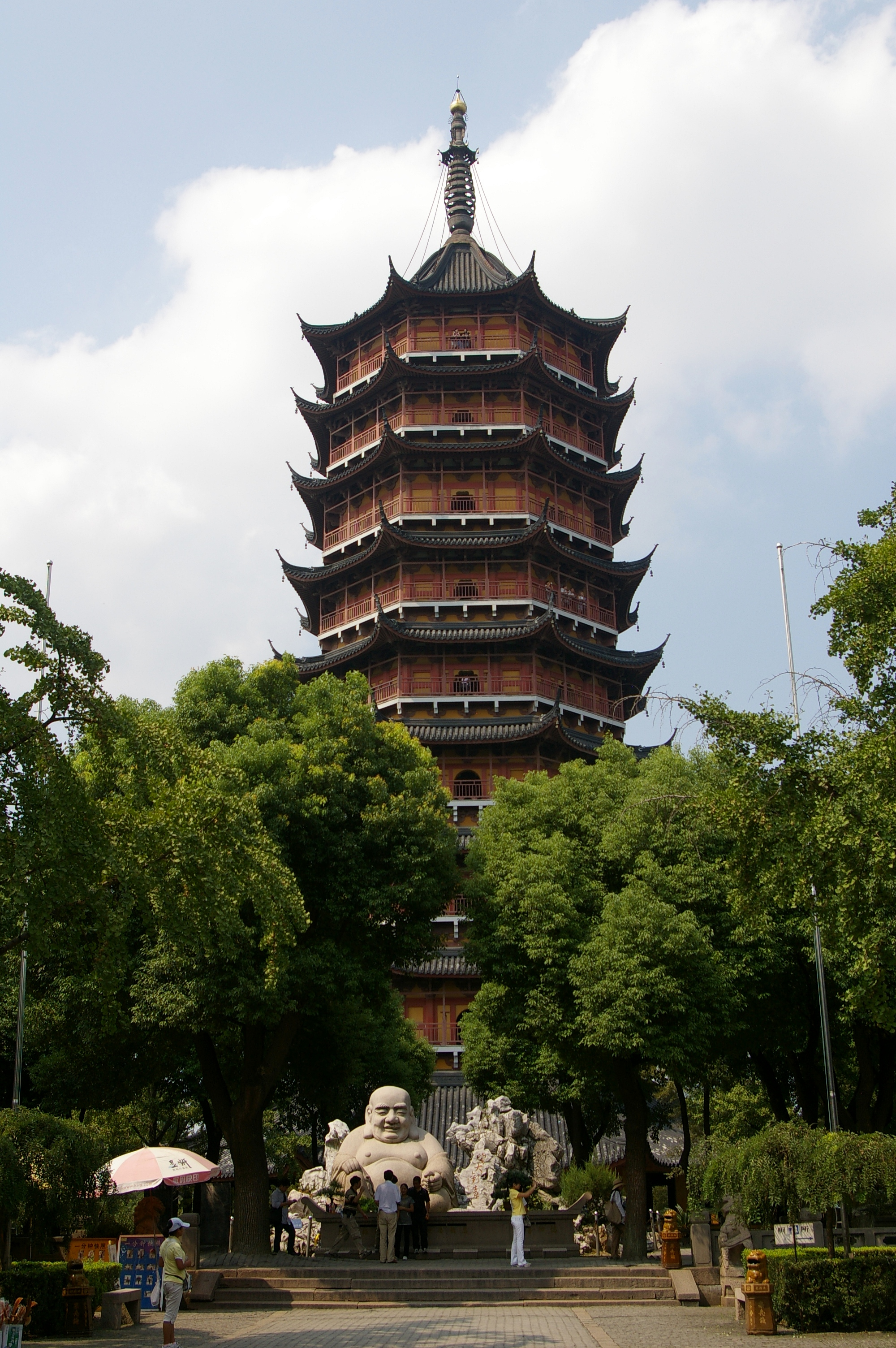
Although rebuilt during the Ming dynasty, the Beisi Pagoda's frame was designed between 1131 and 1162 during the Song period; it stands 76 m (249 ft) tall.

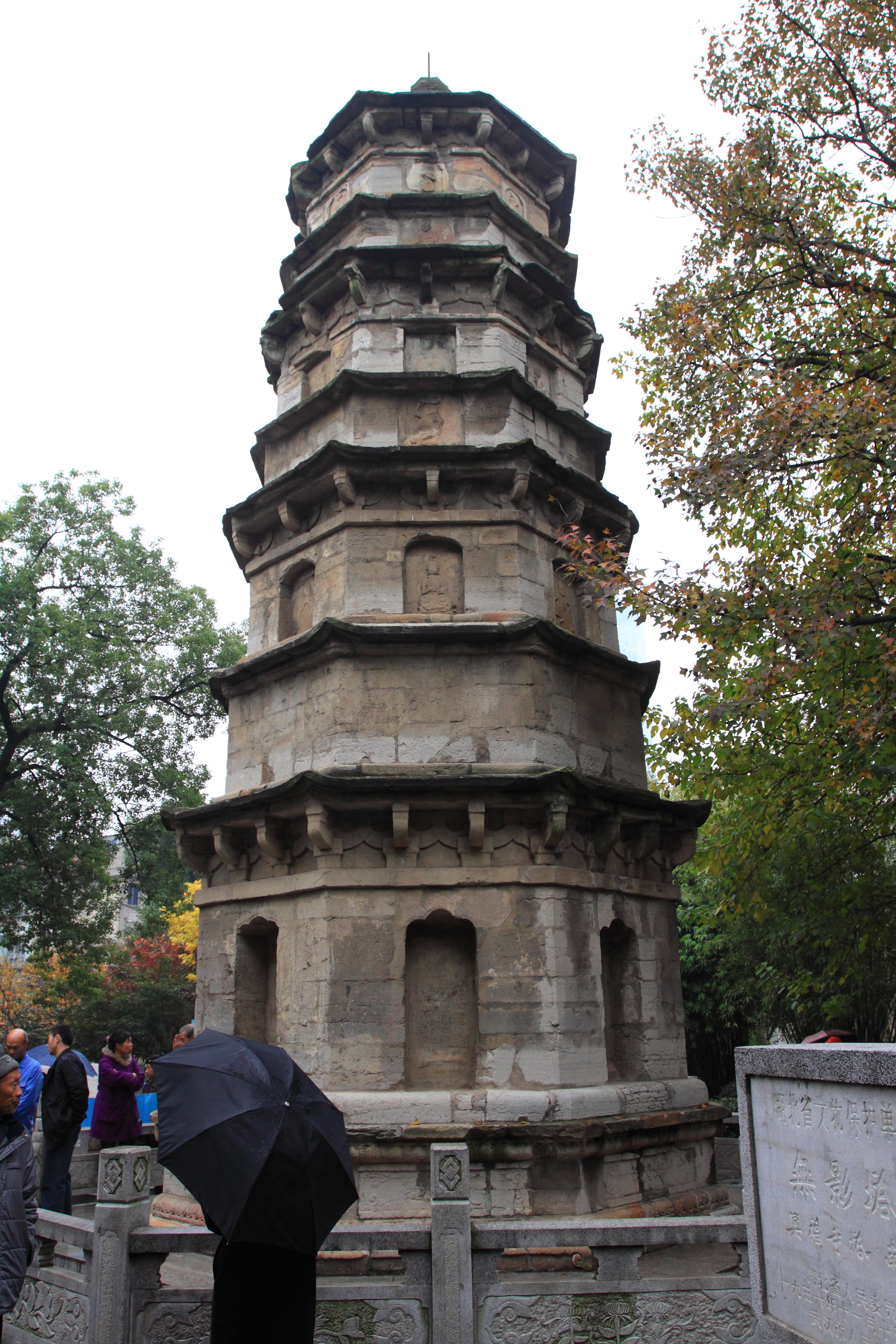
Wuying Pagoda (Shadowless Pagoda) in Wuhan, built in 1270 during the Mongol Invasion of the Southern Song

== Temple halls ==
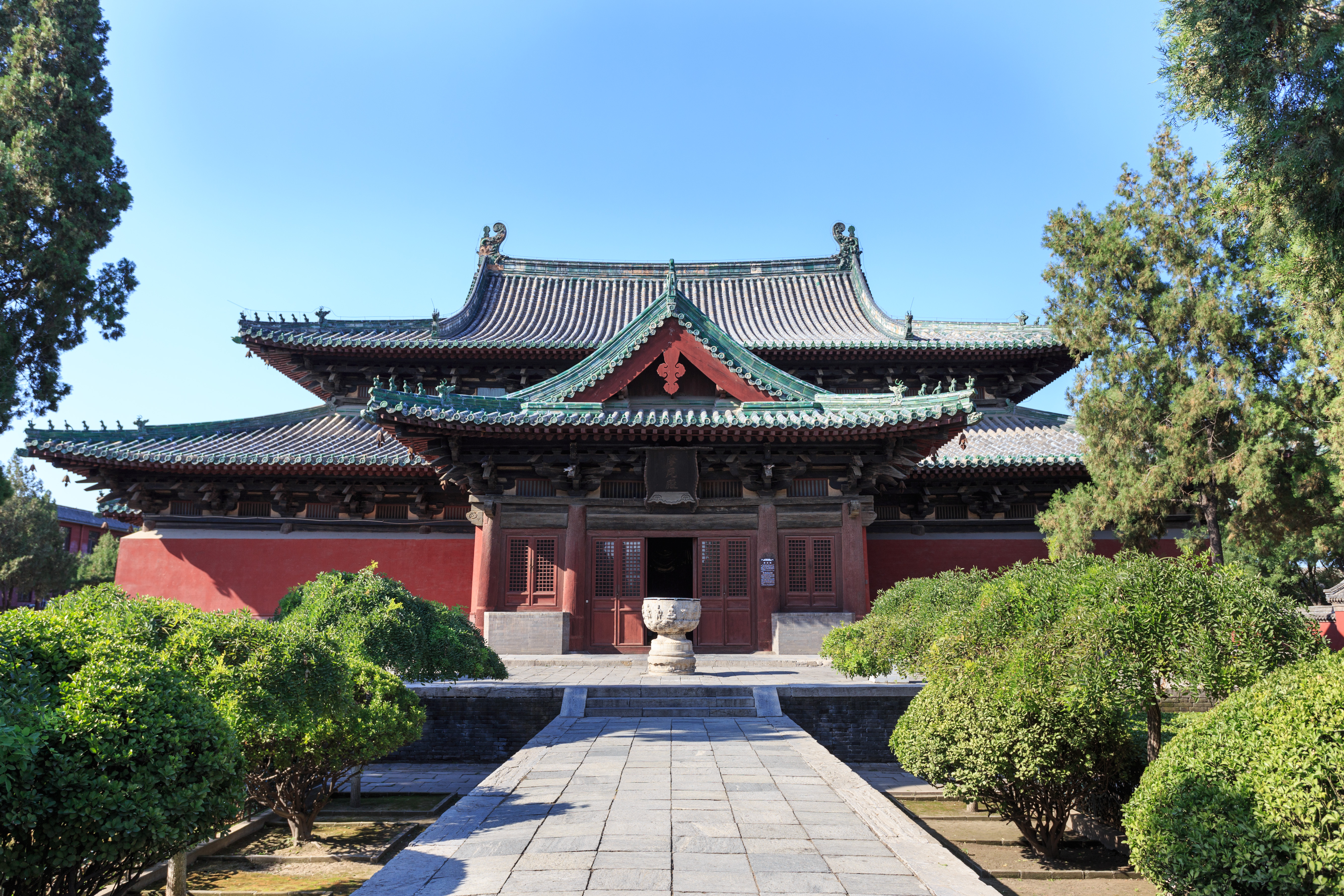
The main hall of Longxing Temple, Zhongding, Hebei, view from the south

After Buddhism spread to China from India during the Han period, Buddhist temples became common throughout the country. With the transmission of Chan Buddhism to Japan, regional Southern Song dynasty building styles influenced Japanese architecture, in particular the construction of the Great South Gate at Todai Temple in Nara, and the Reliquary Hall of Engaku Temple in Kamakura, Japan. During the Song period it was typical for wealthy families to facilitate the construction of large temple complexes, usually by donating a portion of their family estate to a Buddhist sect. Often the land already contained buildings that could be repurposed for religions use. The Fei (費) family of the town of Jinze, located just west of Shanghai, converted a mansion on their property into a Buddhist sutra recitation hall, and later built several other religious buildings around the hall. This spurred a boom in temple construction in the area, causing Jinze to become a major center of the White Lotus sect of Buddhism, which in turn spurred the construction of more temples during the Song era. The nearby town of Nanxiang gained prominence shortly after the Mongol conquest of the Song dynasty in large part due to this construction of temples and other religious buildings.

Temples were also constructed for ancestor worship, Daoism, and deities of the Chinese folk religion. The Hall of the Saintly Mother (圣母殿) and the Hall of Sacrifice at Jin Temple, located in a southeastern suburb of Taiyuan City, Shanxi province, are extant examples of early Song architecture. The "Hall of Heavenly Blessings" (天贶殿) at Dai Temple, located at the foot of Mount Tai in Tai'an, Shandong province, was originally built during the Han period, but the reconstructed building dates to 1008 during the Song era. Due to heavy pilgrimage to Dai Temple, a sizable town grew up around the site, which was protected by a rammed earth wall by 1162. This wall was rebuilt entirely in stone from 1511–1553 during the Ming period. Almost none of the architecture from the Southern Song capital of Hangzhou has survived. This includes the various temples overseeing its West Lake, which can only be observed in paintings by artists such as Li Song.

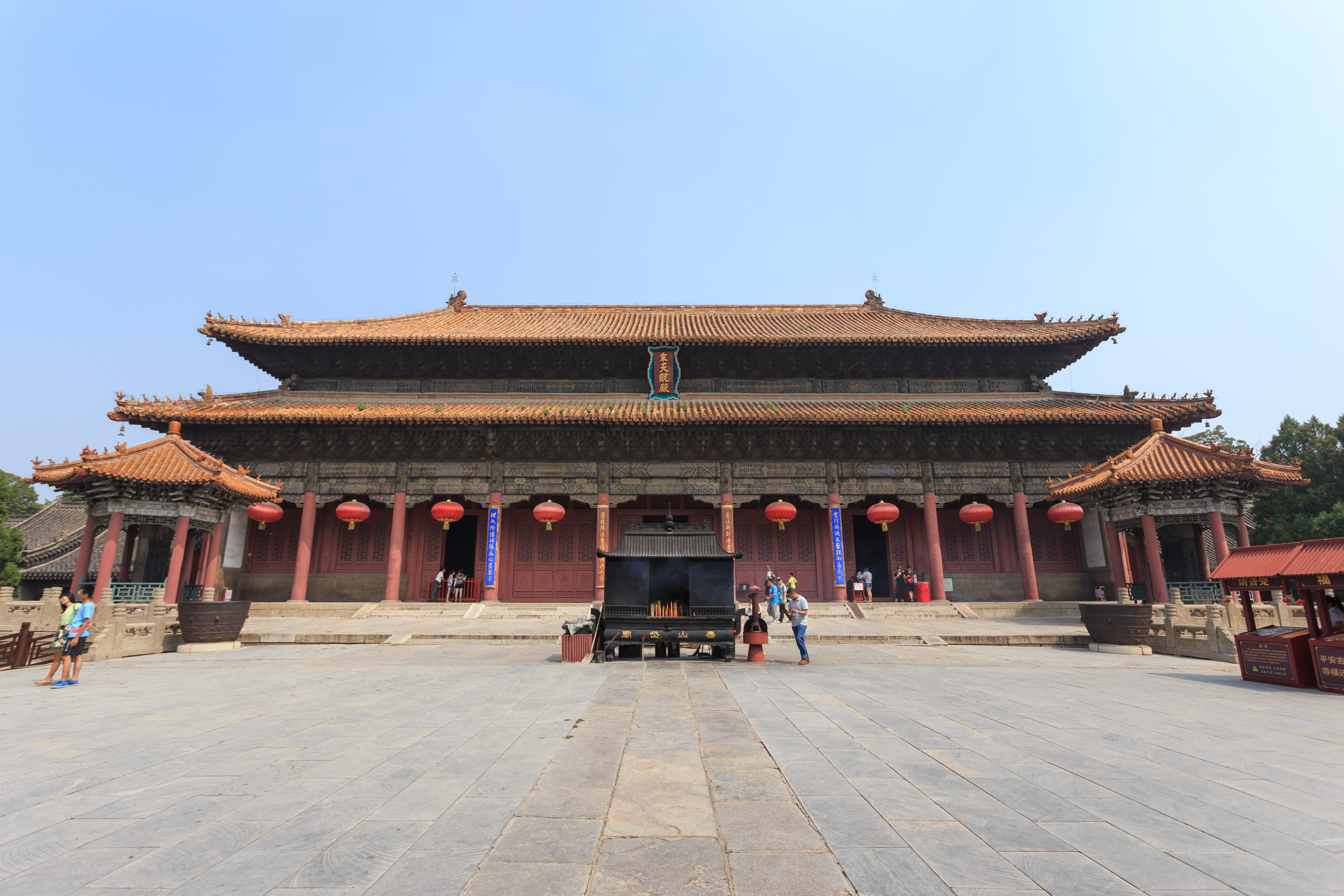
The Hall of Heavenly Blessings at Dai Temple, a Daoist temple at Mount Tai in Tai'an, Shandong

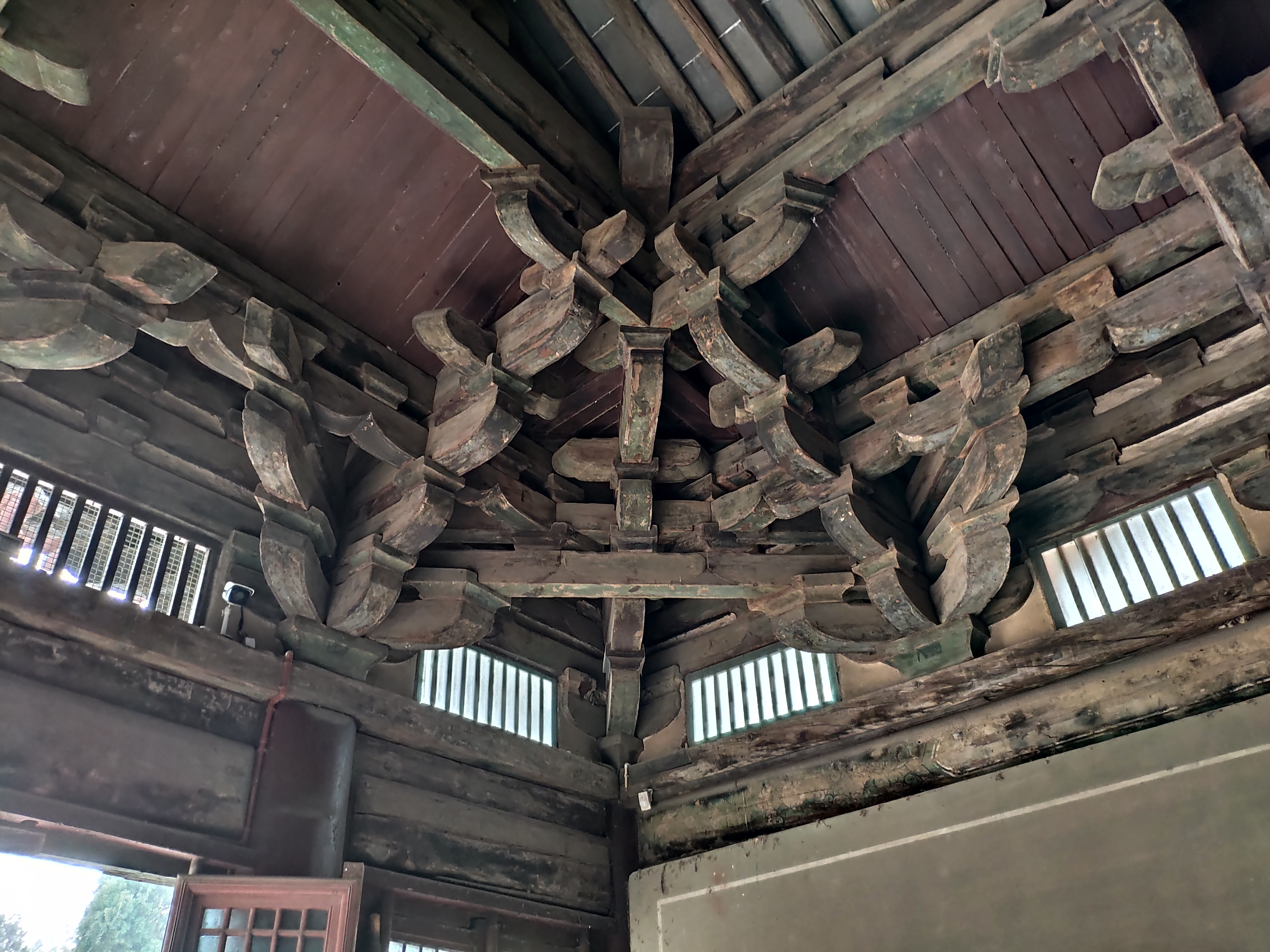
One of the dougong brackets on the inner corner of the main hall of Longxing Temple

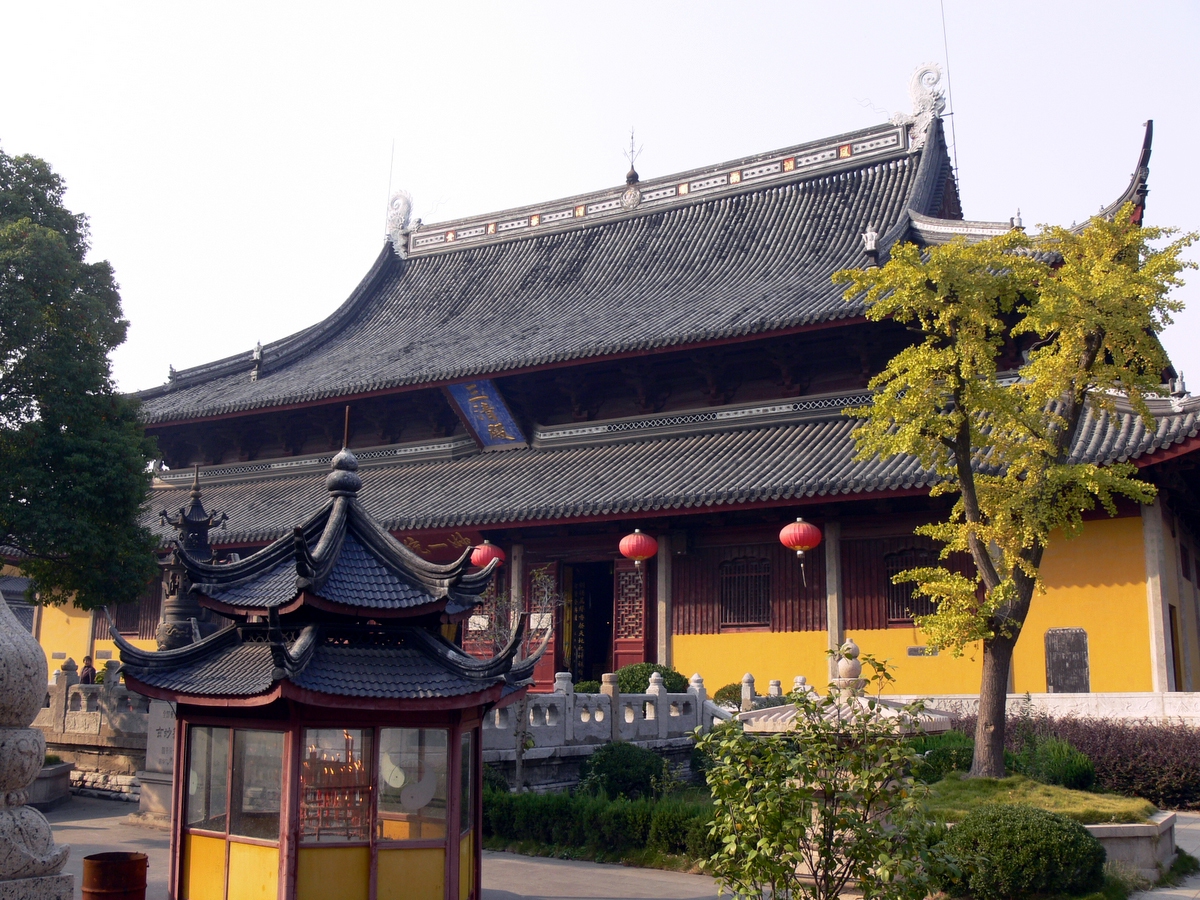
Trinity Hall of Xuanmiao Temple, Suzhou

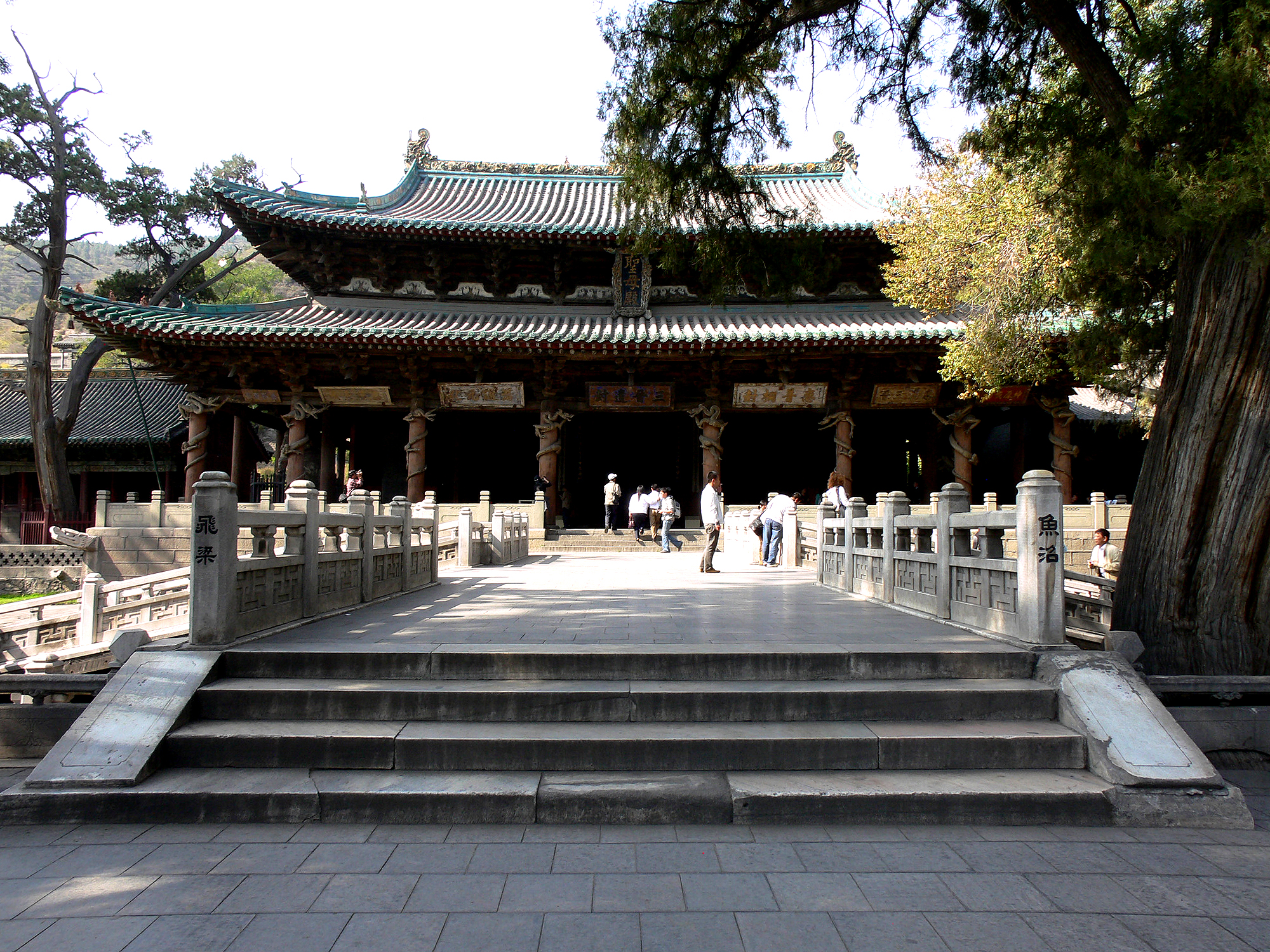
Hall of the Holy Mother at Jin Temple, Taiyuan, Shanxi, built in 1032

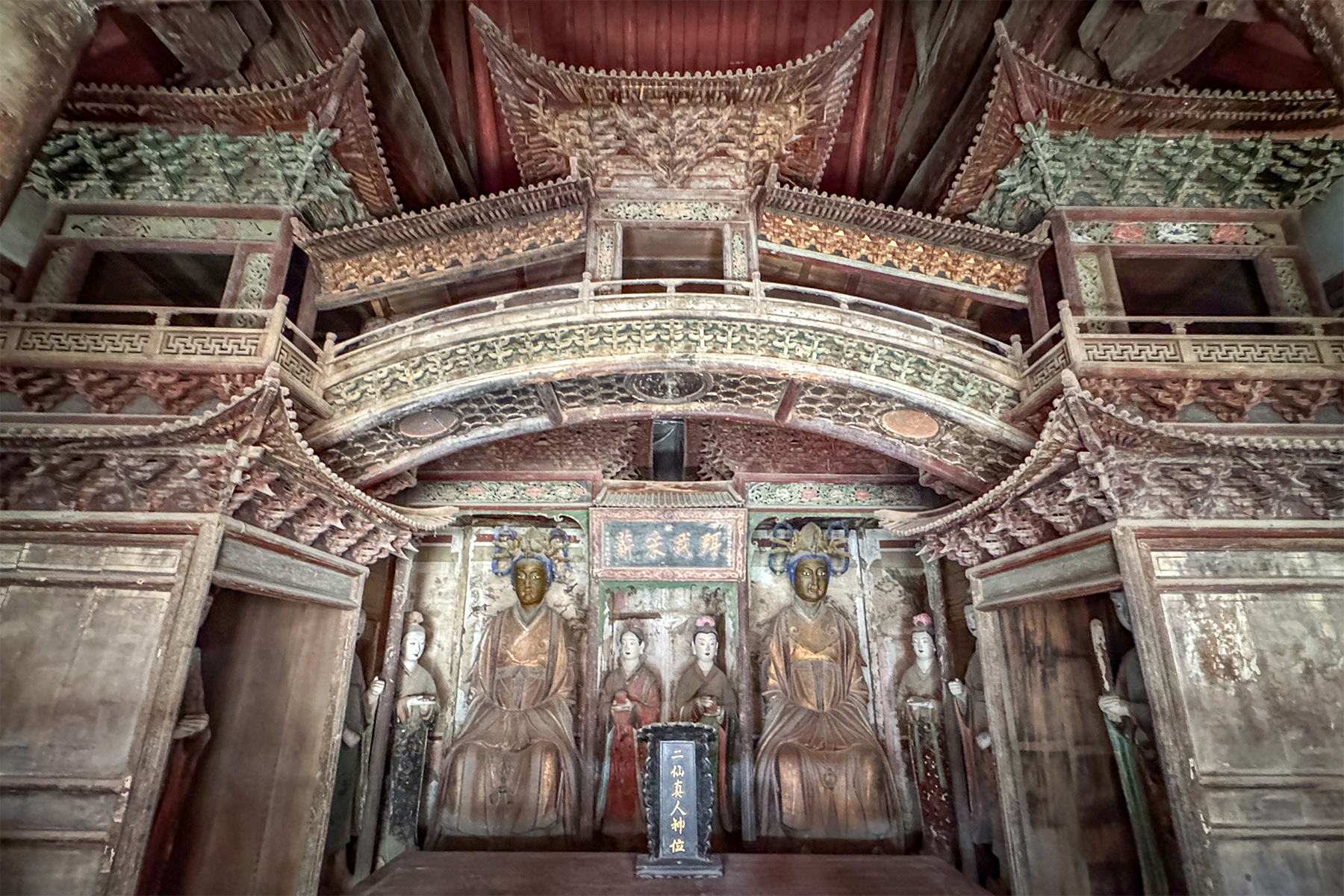
Shrine as a "Heavenly Palace" tower and arch bridge at Erxian Temple, Xiaonancun, Shanxi

== Bridges ==
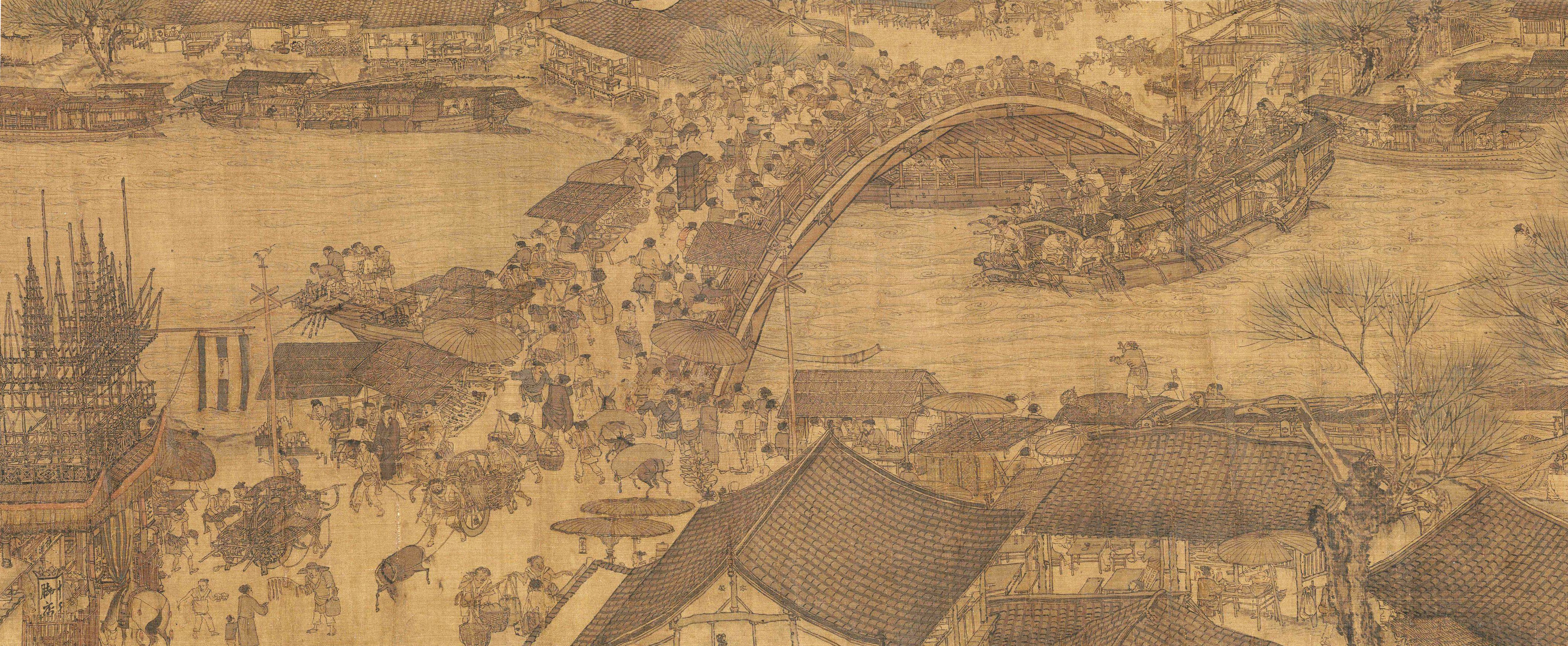
Woven timber arch bridge as depicted on Along the River During the Qingming Festival.

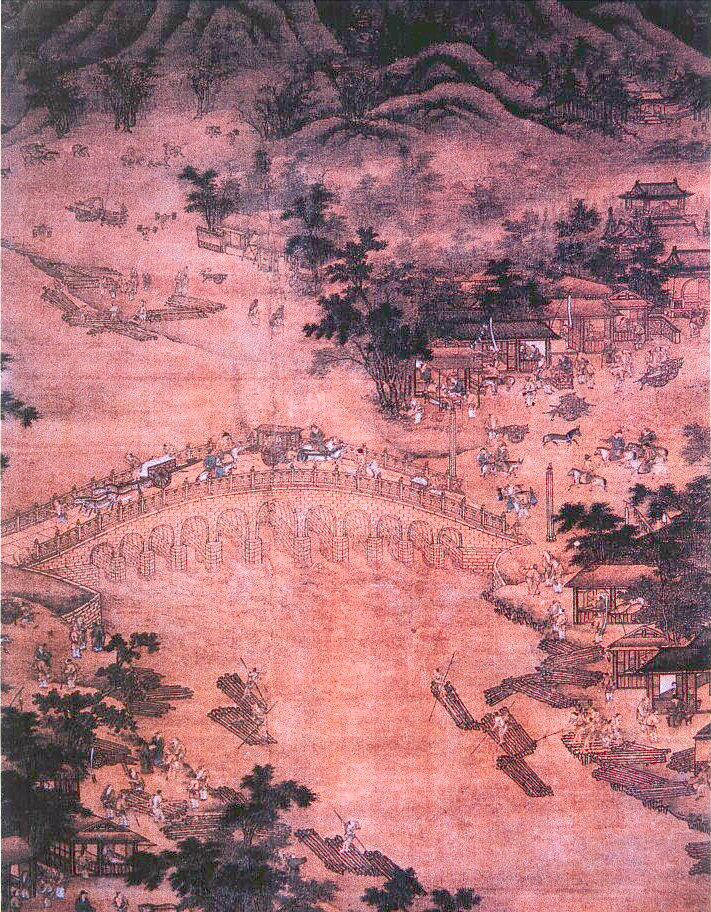
The Lugou Bridge (Marco Polo Bridge), originally built from 1189 to 1192, and reconstructed in 1698

The construction of bridges over waterways has been recorded in China since the ancient Zhou dynasty. During the Song dynasty, large trestle bridges were constructed, such as the one built by Zhang Zhongyan in 1158. There were also large bridges made entirely of stone, like the Bazi Bridge of Shaoxing, built in 1256 and still standing today.

In 1221, the Taoist traveler Qiu Changchun visited the court of Genghis Khan in Samarkand. He described various Chinese bridges encountered on the way there through the Tian Shan Mountains, east of Yining. The historian Joseph Needham quotes Qiu and provides commentary:

[The road had] "no less than 48 timber bridges of such width that two carts can drive over them side by side". It had been built by Chang Jung [Zhang Rong] and the other engineers of the Chagatai some years before. The wooden trestles of Chinese bridges from the −3rd century [BC] onwards were no doubt similar to those supposed to have been employed in Julius Caesar's bridge of −55 [BC] across the Rhine, or drawn by Leonardo, or found in use in Africa. But where in +13th century [AD] Europe could a two-lane highway like Chang Jung's have been found?

In Fujian Province, enormous beam bridges were built during the Song dynasty. Some of these were as long as 1,220 m (4,000 ft), with individual spans of up to 22 m (72 ft) in length; their construction necessitated moving massive stones of 203 t (203,000 kg). No names of the engineers were recorded or appear in the inscriptions on the bridges, which give only the names of local officials who sponsored them and oversaw their construction and repair. However, there might have been an engineering school in Fujian, headed by a prominent engineer known as Cai Xiang (1012–1067), who had risen to the position of governmental prefect in Fujian. Between 1053 and 1059, he planned and supervised the construction of the large Wanan Bridge (once called the Luoyang Bridge) near Quanzhou (on the border of the present-day Luojiang District and Huai'an County).

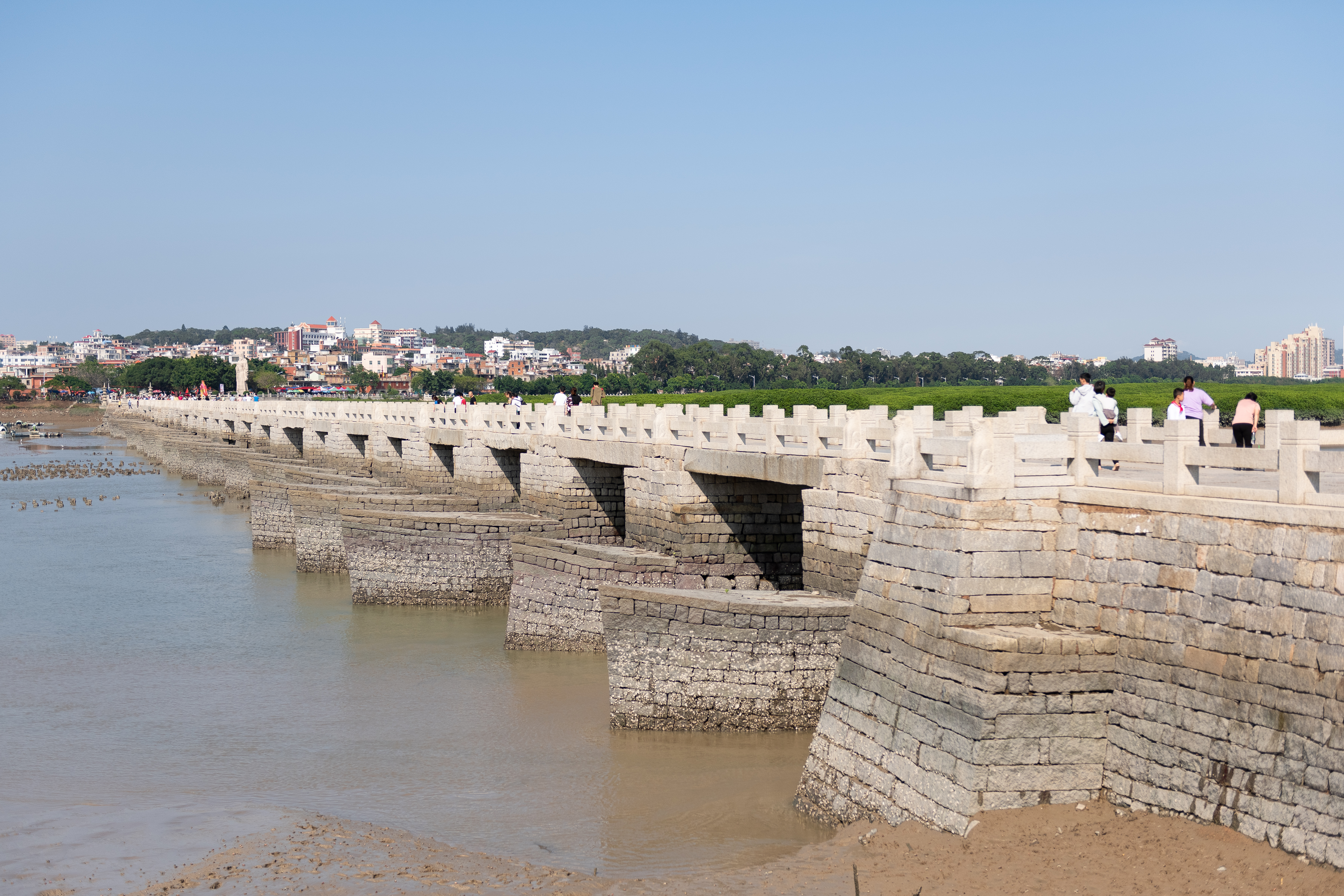
The Luoyang Bridge of Quanzhou, Fujian, completed in 1059

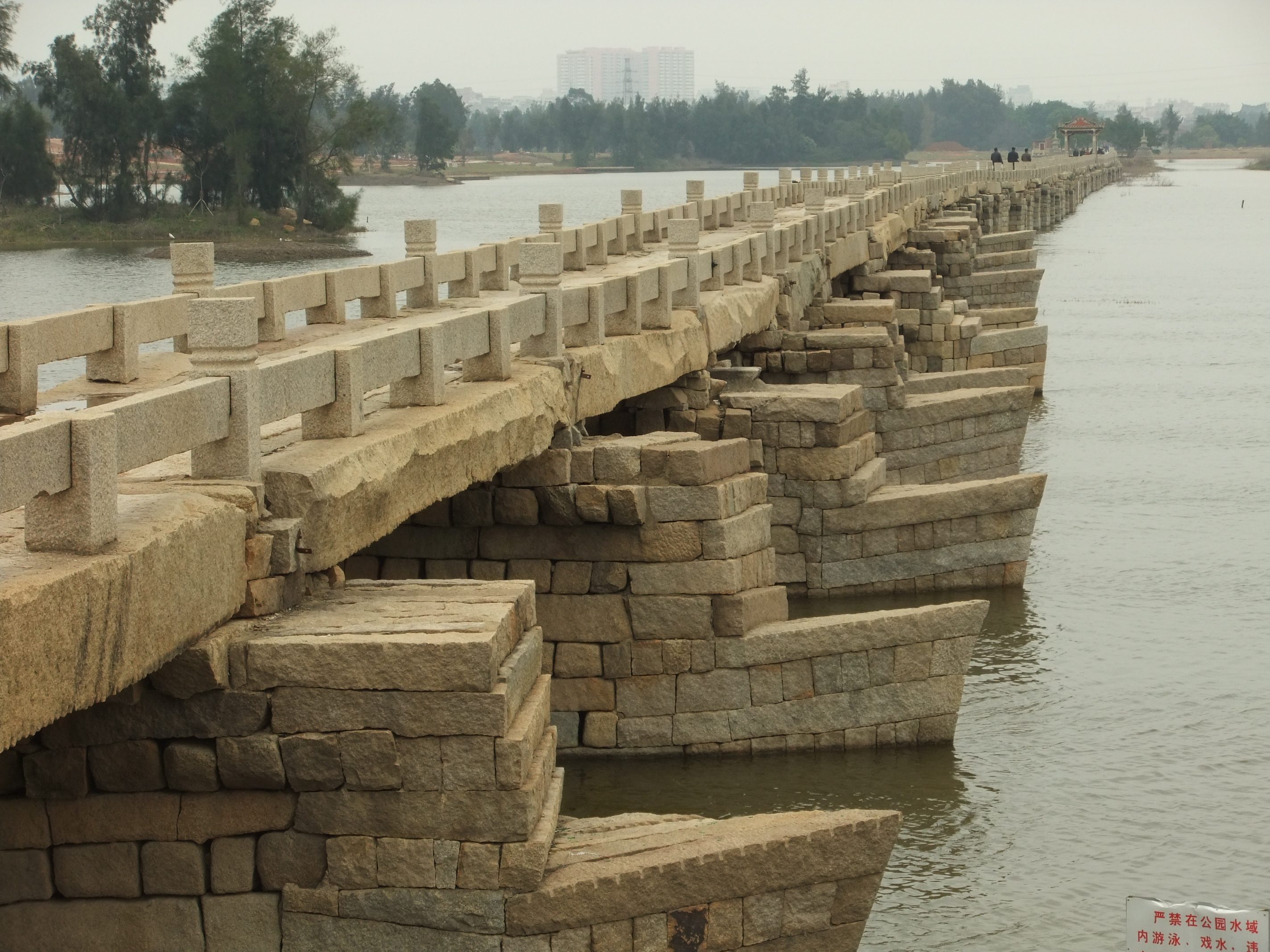
The Anping Bridge of Quanzhou, Fujian, completed in 1151

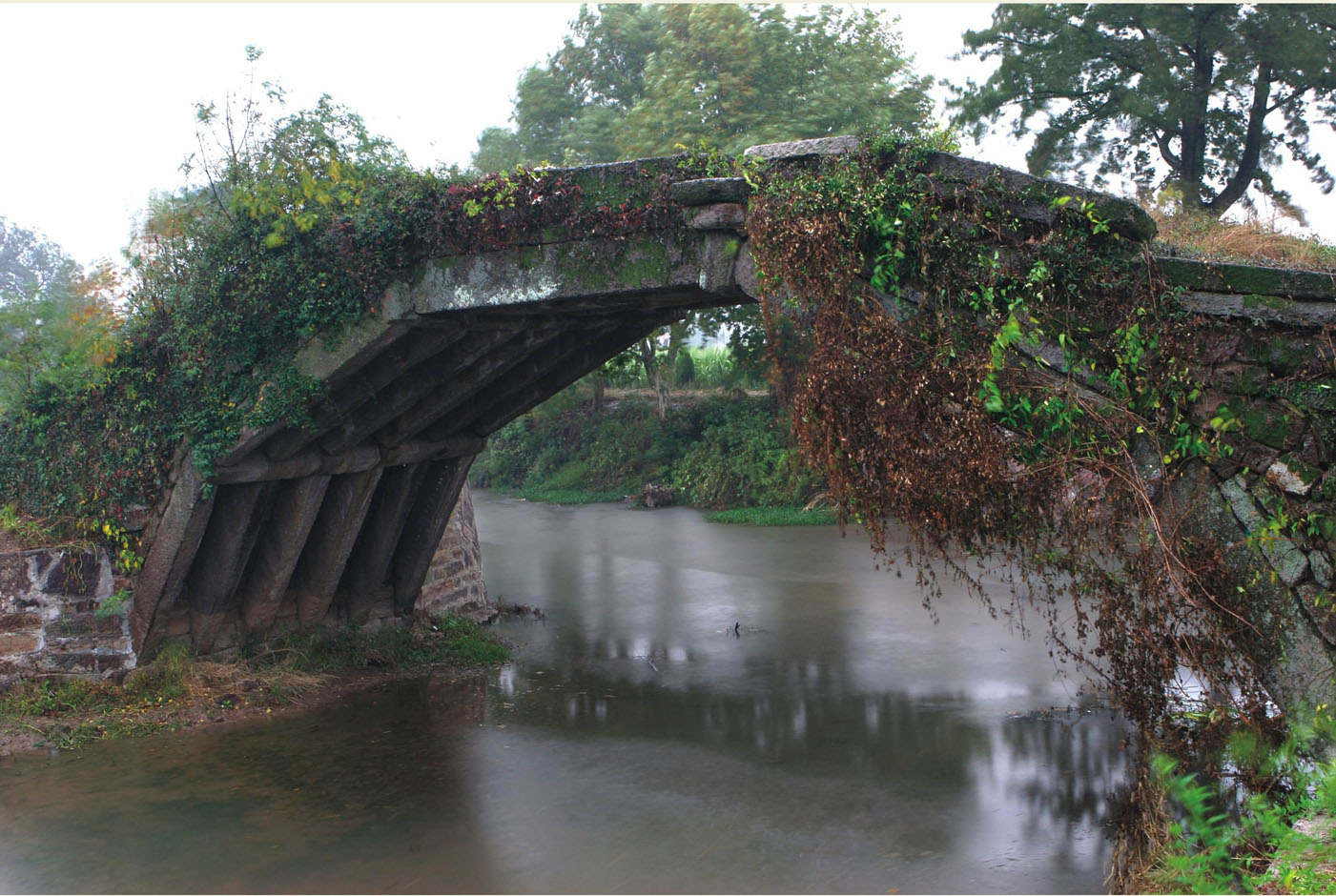
The Guyue Bridge of Yiwu, Zhejiang, built in 1213

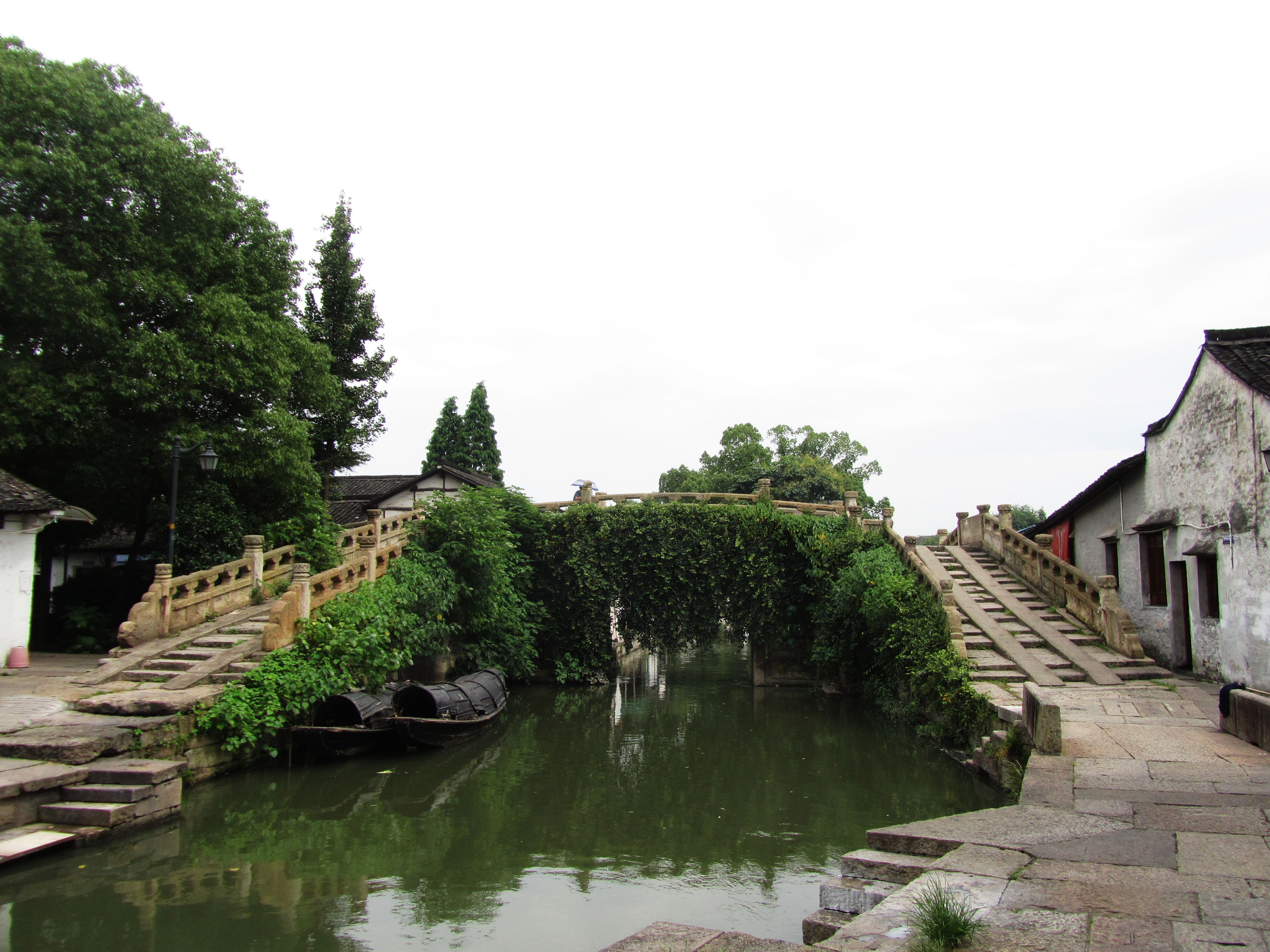
The Bazi Bridge of Shaoxing, Zhejiang, built in 1256

== Tombs of Northern Song emperors ==
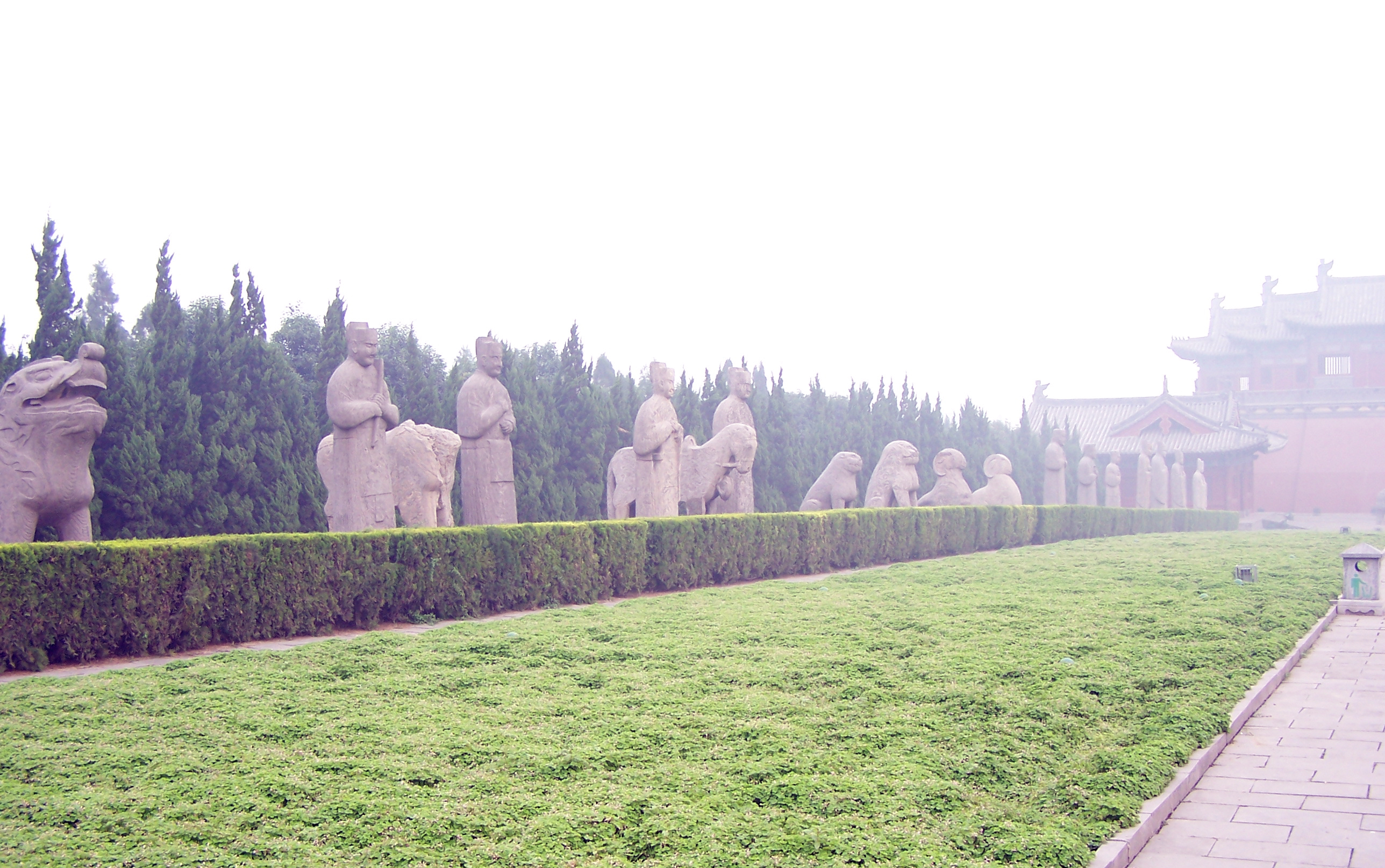
Statues along a spirit road of the Northern Song tomb complex in Gongyi, Henan

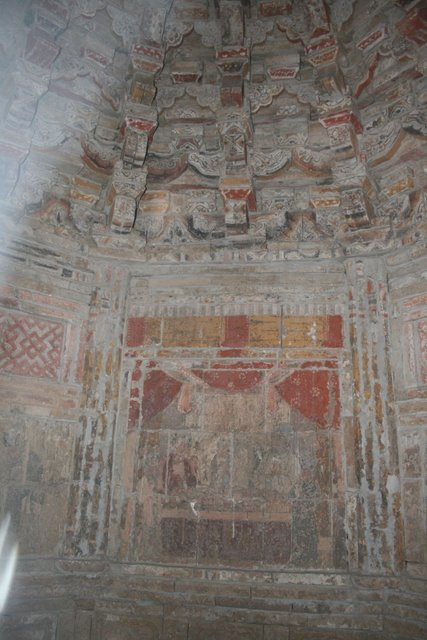
Frescoes and dougong bracket sets from the tomb of Song Silang, Northern Song dynasty, located in Luoyang

Located southwest of Gongyi city in Henan province, the large tombs of the Northern Song number about one thousand, including individual tombs for Song emperors, empresses, princes, princesses, consorts, and members of the extended family. The complex extends approximately 7 km (4.3 mi) from east to west and 8 km (5.0 mi) from north to south. The construction of the complex began in 963 AD, during the reign of the first Song ruler, Emperor Taizu of Song, whose father is also buried at the site. The only Northern Song emperors not buried there are Emperor Huizong of Song and Emperor Qinzong of Song, who died in captivity after the Jin–Song Wars in 1127. Lining the spirit ways of the tomb complex are hundreds of Song sculptures and statues of tigers, rams, lions, horses with grooms, horned beasts and mythical creatures, government officials, military generals, foreign ambassadors, and others featured in an enormous display of Song-era artwork.

The layout and style of the Song tombs resemble those found in the contemporary Tangut kingdom of the Western Xia, which also had an auxiliary burial site associated with each tomb. At the center of each burial site is a truncated pyramidal tomb. Each of these tombs was once guarded by a four-walled enclosure containing four centered gates and four corner towers. About 100 km (62 mi) from Gongxian is the Baisha Tomb, which according to historian Nancy S. Steinhardt contains "elaborate facsimiles in brick of Chinese timber frame construction, from door lintels to pillars and pedestals to bracket sets, that adorn interior walls". The Baisha Tomb has two large separate chambers with conical domed ceilings; a large staircase leads down to the entrance doors of the subterranean tomb.

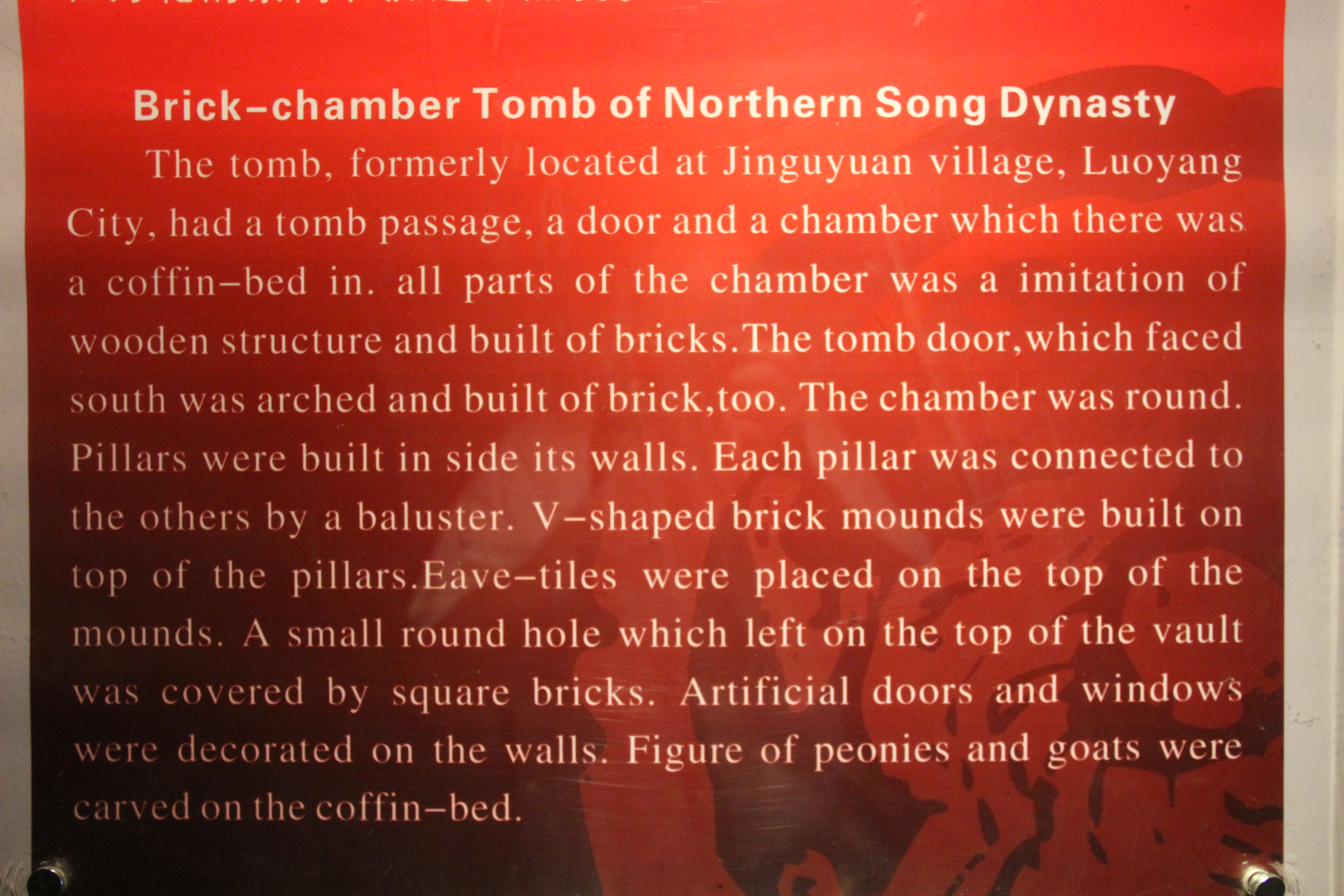
Museum curator description of a Northern Song dynasty era tomb at the Luoyang Ancient Tombs Museum, Henan

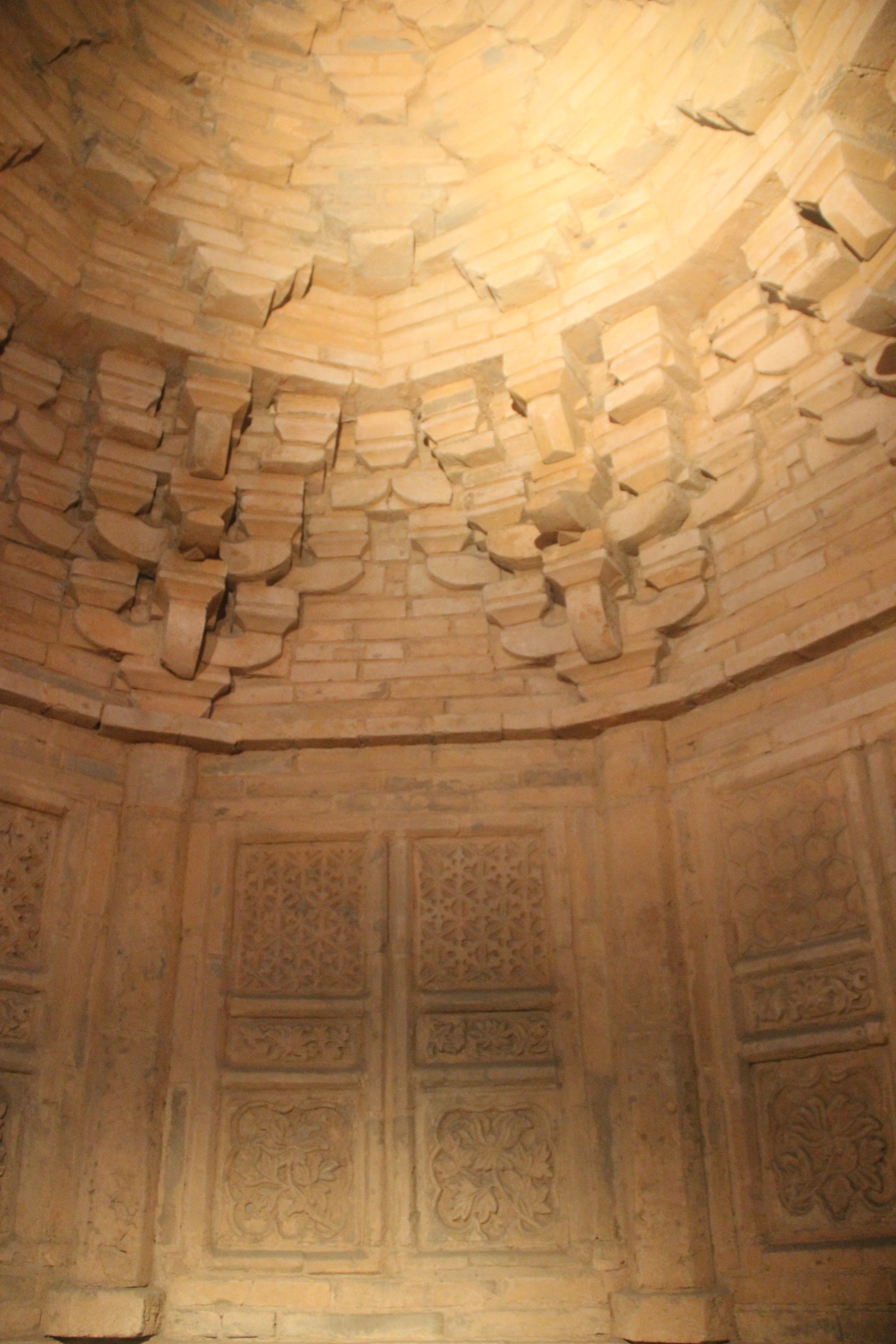
Brickwork masonry and interior facade of a Northern Song dynasty tomb imitating elements of ancient Chinese wooden architecture, featured at the Luoyang Ancient Tombs Museum, Henan

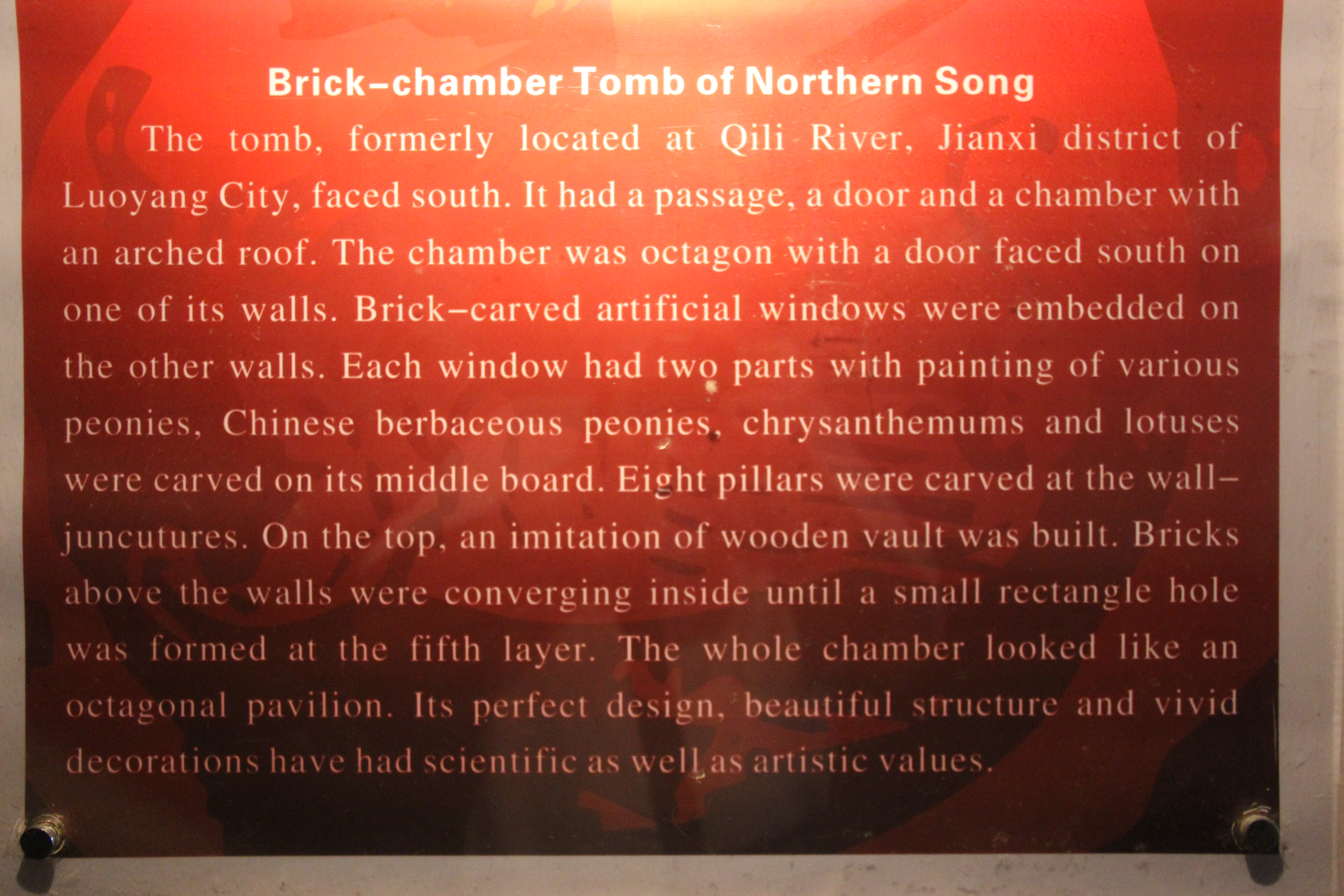
Museum curator description of a Northern Song dynasty era tomb at the Luoyang Ancient Tombs Museum, Henan

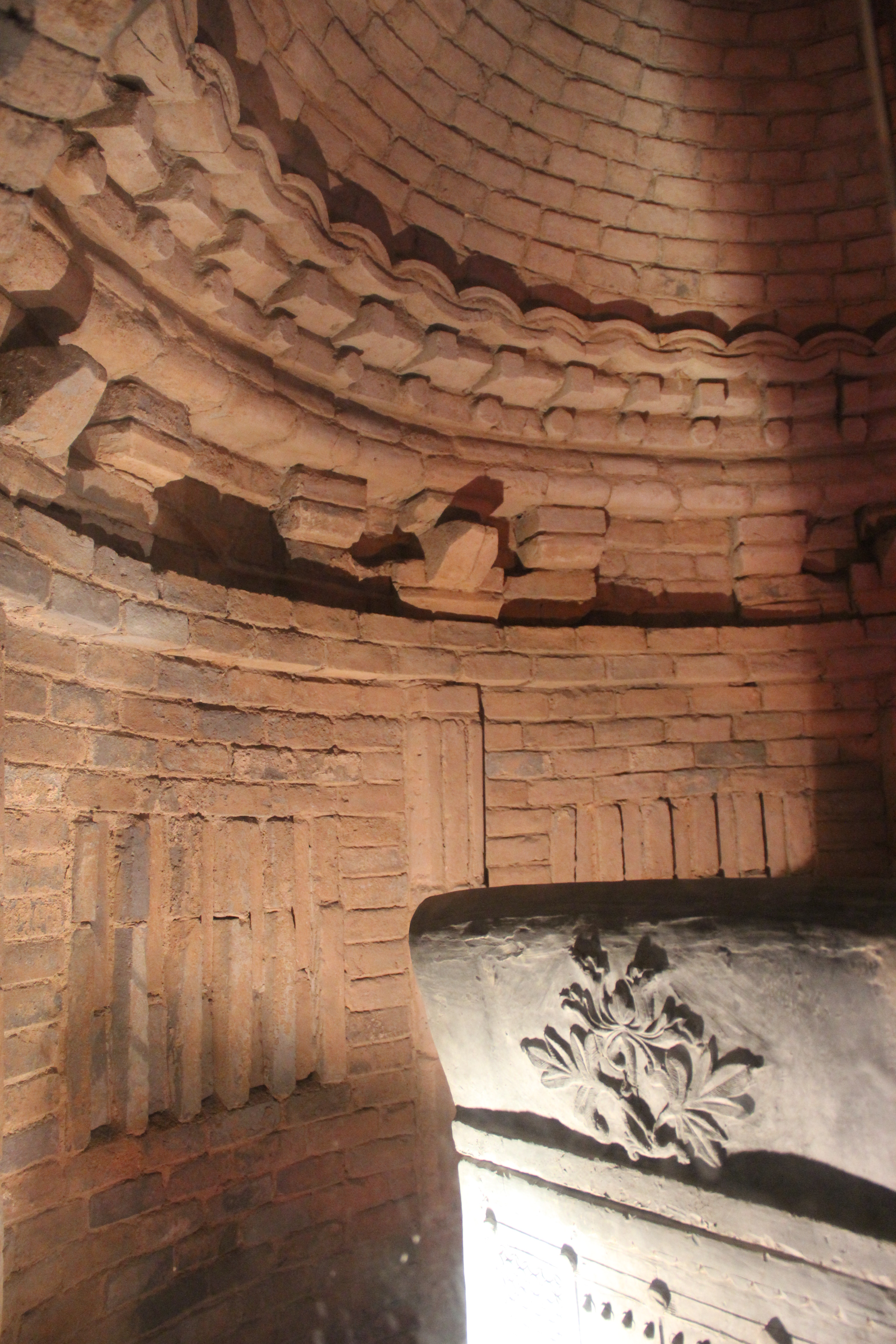
Brickwork masonry and interior facade of a Northern Song dynasty tomb imitating elements of ancient Chinese wooden architecture, with a domed ceiling, featured at the Luoyang Ancient Tombs Museum, Henan

== Gardens ==
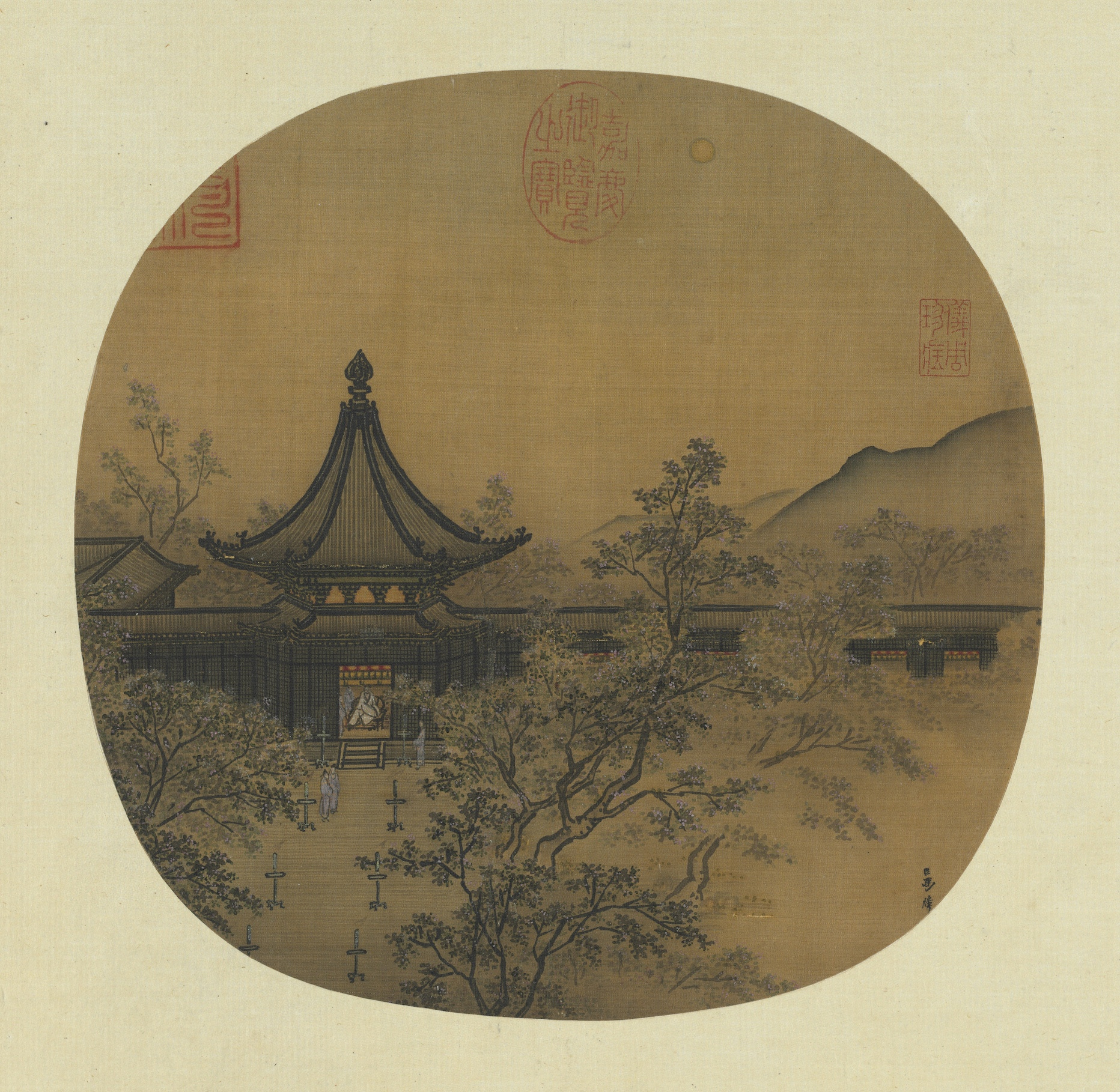
Expecting Guests, a Southern Song era painting by Ma Lin, c. 1250

Chinese garden architecture during the Song period provided private owners of gardens with a place to rest, enjoy leisure activities, host guests, and admire scenic beauty. While much information about them can be gleaned from sources such as paintings, poems, records, notes, and histories, most physical remains of them are now lost. Gardens such as Canglang Pavilion in Suzhou and Shen Garden in Shaoxing have been heavily remodeled since they were built in the Song period. The extant gardens of Empress Yang (Gongsheng) in Hangzhou and the Zhang Family's East Garden in Shimen, Zhejiang represent the only known archaeological sites with gardens that can be firmly dated to the Song period.

Song Chinese gardens typically featured buildings such as pavilions, halls, terraces, multistory towers, hermitages, and bridges. The epigrapher and scholar-official Ouyang Xiu constructed a painted "boat-shaped" pavilion (resembling an unmoored boat) in 1042 that provided the sensation of sailing leisurely down a river valley with a railed veranda that overlooked a garden containing steep rocky cliffsides and dense forest. Contemporary scholars praised its design, which soon became popular among wealthy Song Chinese literari and also influenced later Ming (1368–1644) and Qing dynasty (1644–1912) gardens. Japanese Zen gardens of the Kamakura period share a similar appreciation for emphasizing the vastness of nature in spatial arrangements, while terraced Italian Renaissance gardens tackled similar problems of using sloped terrains.

Outside of government-run schools, private academies were founded in China during the Tang period. Fueled by the growth of woodblock printing and spread of Neo-Confucianism, during the Song dynasty they became a common feature within private gardens, where they evolved from private study halls for scholar-officials. Another type was the "high building" used for storing books since the Han dynasty, a multistory building that became popular in Southern Song era gardens for storing books, paintings, and other valuables. This trend among others such as garden buildings with four-sided pyramidal roofs and tiled rooftops linked together continued into the Ming and Qing eras, while roofs with upward curving eaves were used by both the Southern Song and the Mongol Yuan dynasty (1279–1368) in southern China.

== Contemporary literature ==
=== Overview ===
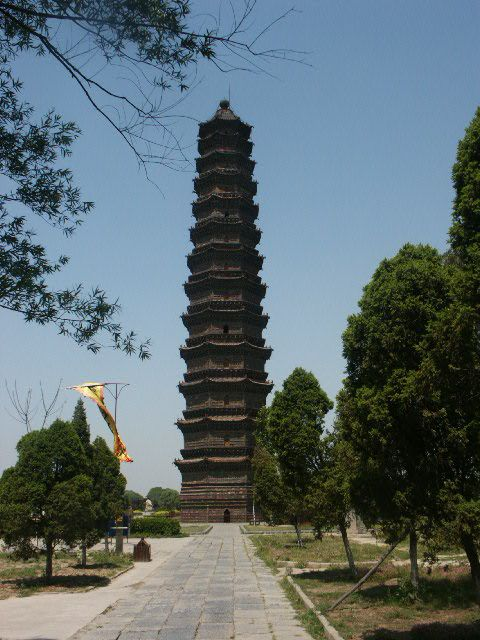
The Iron Pagoda of Kaifeng, built in 1049, stands 57 m (187 ft) in height. It was constructed shortly after Yu Hao's wooden pagoda was destroyed by lightning.

During the Song dynasty, Chinese written works on architecture were brought to more sophisticated levels of description, including tomes such as the influential Yili Shigong written in 1193 AD. However, one of the most definitive works was the Mu Jing ('Timberwork Manual'), ascribed to Yu Hao and written sometime between 965 and 995. Yu Hao was responsible for the construction of a wooden pagoda tower in Kaifeng, which was destroyed by lightning and rebuilt with brick in 1049 as the so-called Iron Pagoda. In his day, books on architecture were still considered a low scholarly achievement due to the social status of craftsmen, so Mu Jing was not even recorded in the official court bibliography. Although the book itself was lost to history, the scientist and statesman Shen Kuo wrote of Yu's work extensively in his Dream Pool Essays of 1088, praising it as a work of architectural genius and that no one in his own time could reproduce it. Shen Kuo singled out passages in which Yu Hao gives advice to another artisan-architect about slanting struts in order to brace a pagoda against the wind; another where Yu Hao describes the three sections of a building, the area above the crossbeams, the area above ground, and the foundation; and another where he provides proportional ratios and construction techniques for each section.

=== Yingzao Fashi ===
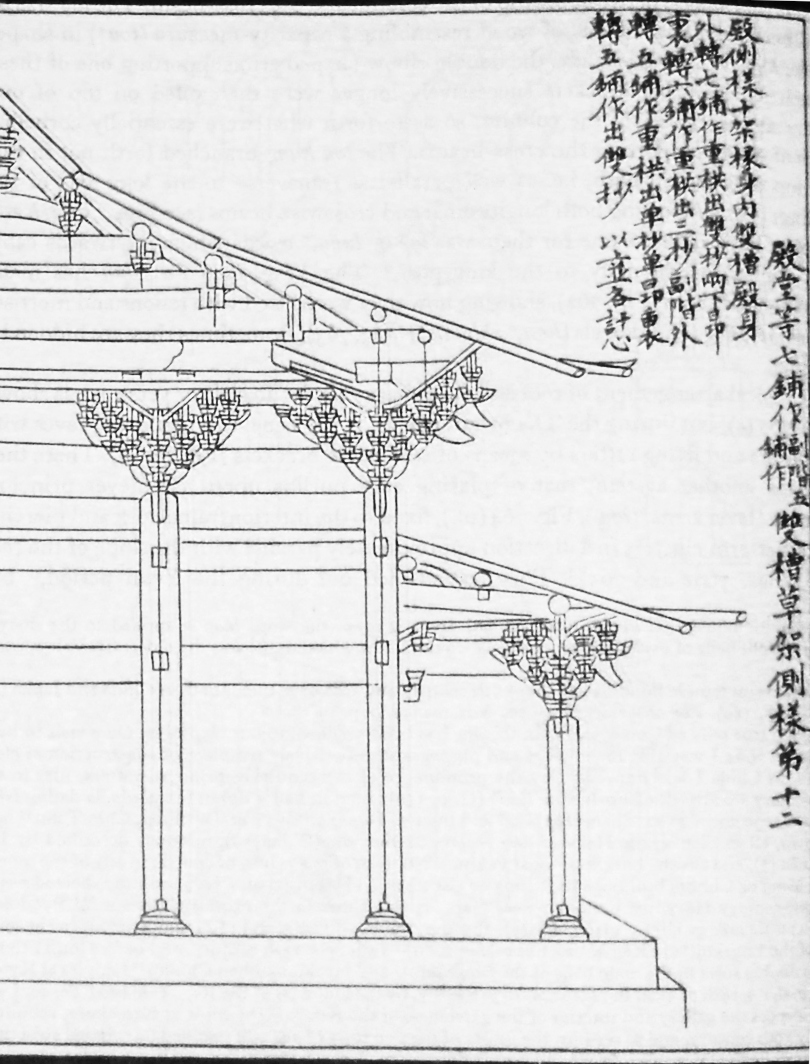
Diagram of corbel brackets from the cross-section of a hall, from Li Jie's Yingzao Fashi, completed and presented to the Song royal court in 1100, and officially published in 1103

The Yingzao Fashi ('Treatise on Architectural Methods'), a technical treatise on architecture and craftsmanship written at the Directorate of Buildings and Construction, was completed in 1100 and presented to Emperor Zhezong of Song in the last year of his reign. Although similar books came before it, such as the Yingshan Ling ('National Building Law') of the early Tang dynasty, this is the earliest manual on Chinese architecture to have survived in full. Zhezong's successor, Emperor Huizong of Song, had the treatise officially published three years later, in 1103, for the benefit of foremen, architects, and literate craftsmen. The book was intended to provide standard regulations, to not only the engineering agencies of the central government, but also the many workshops and artisan families throughout China who could benefit from using a well-written government manual on building practices.

The Yingzao Fashi includes building codes and regulations, accounting information, descriptions of construction materials, and classification of crafts. In its 34 chapters, the book outlined units of measurement, and the construction of moats, fortifications, stonework, and woodwork. For the latter, it included specifications for making bracketing units with inclined arms and joints for columns and beams. It also provided specifications for wood carving, drilling, sawing, bamboo construction, tiling, wall building, and decoration. The book also contained recipes for decorative paints, glazes, and coatings. It listed proportions for mixing mortars used in masonry, brickwork, and manufacture of glazed tiles. It illustrated these practices and standards with detailed drawings accompanying the text.

The Yingzao Fashi also outlined structural carpentry in great detail, providing standard dimensional measurements for all components used. Li Jie developed a standard eight-grade system for sizing timber elements, known as the cai-fen system of units, which could be universally applied in wooden buildings. Modern researchers assess the structural integrity of buildings utilizing the methods and building components outlined in the Yingzao Fashi.

Roughly 8% of the book was derived from officially published works on architecture; the vast majority of it documented the inherited oral traditions and preexisting written materials of craftsmen and architects. The Yingzao Fashi provided a full glossary of technical terms that included mathematical formulae, building proportions, and construction techniques, and discussed the implications of the local topography for construction at a particular site. In his book, Li Jie also estimated the rough daily monetary costs for hiring various laborers and craftsmen possessing different skill levels, and the price of the materials they would need, adjusting these figures for different season of the year.

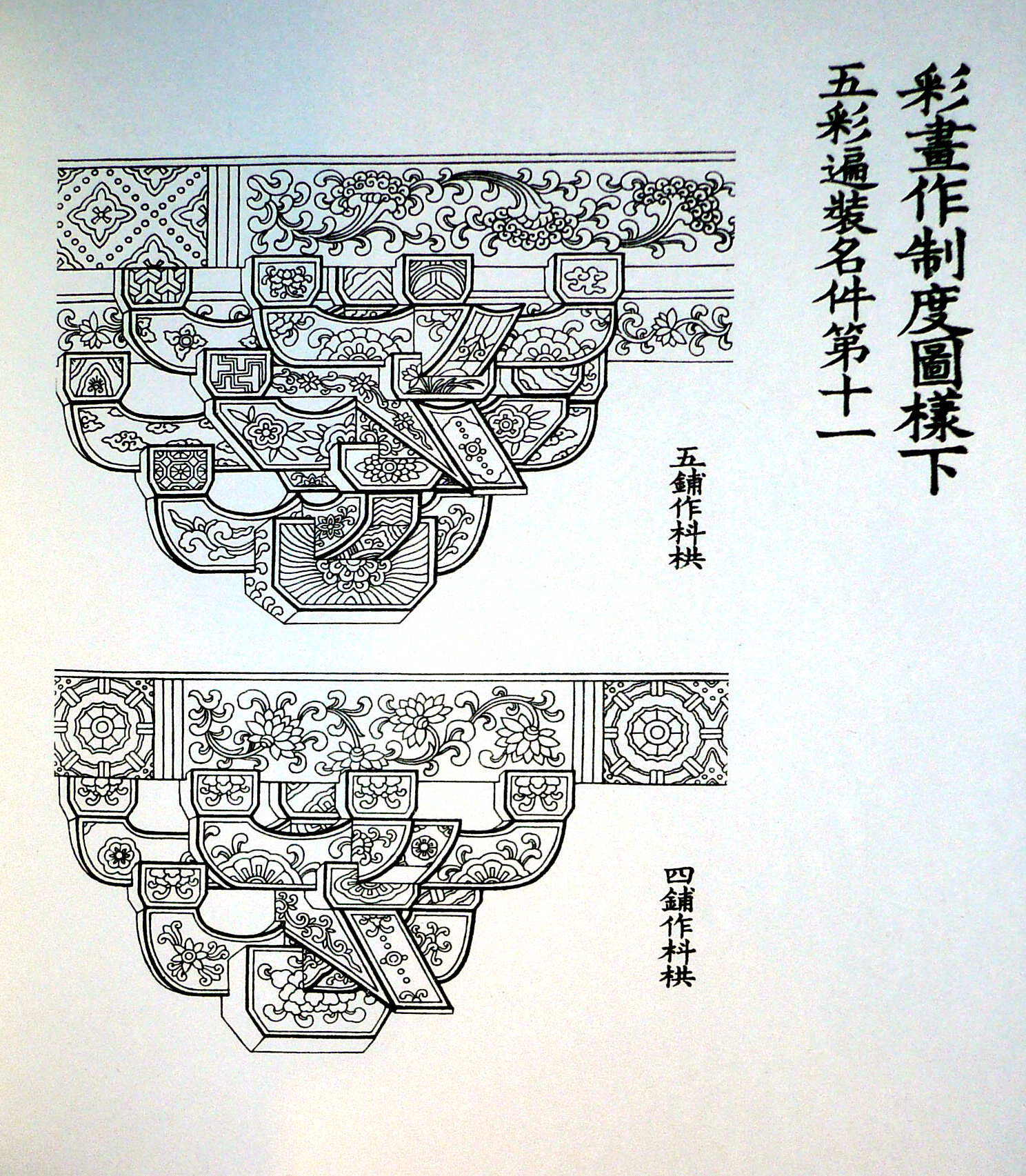
"Wucai Caihua" (Five Colored Painting) decorations on dougong brackets, as detailed in the Yingzao Fashi (1103)

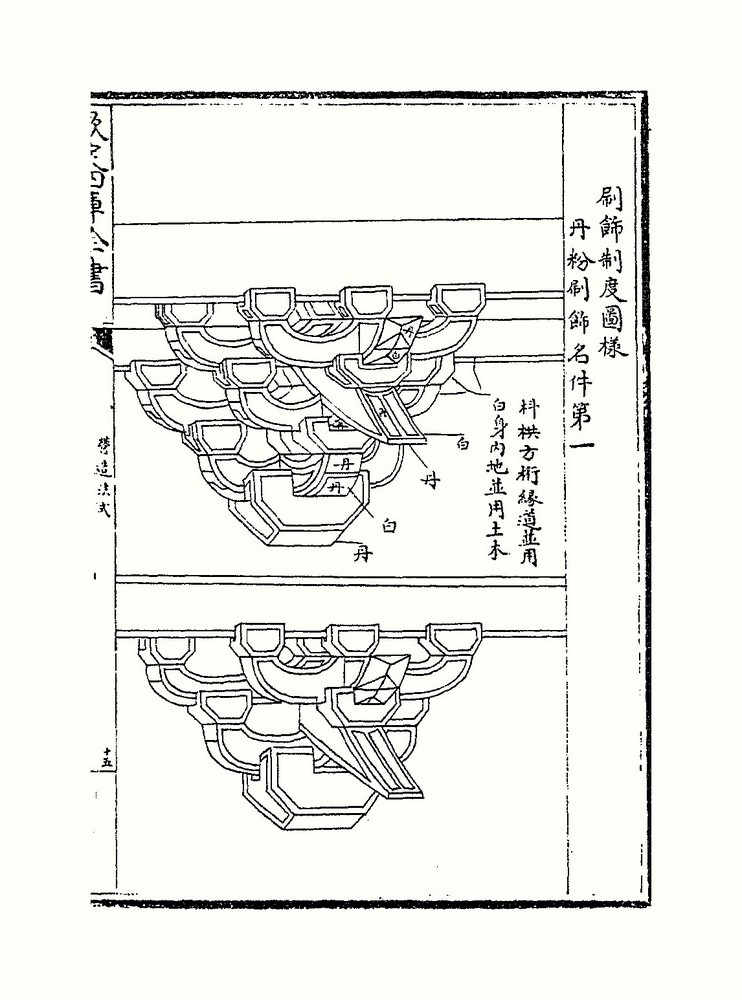
"Danfen Caihua" (Red and White) decorations on dougong brackets, as detailed in the Yingzao Fashi (1103)

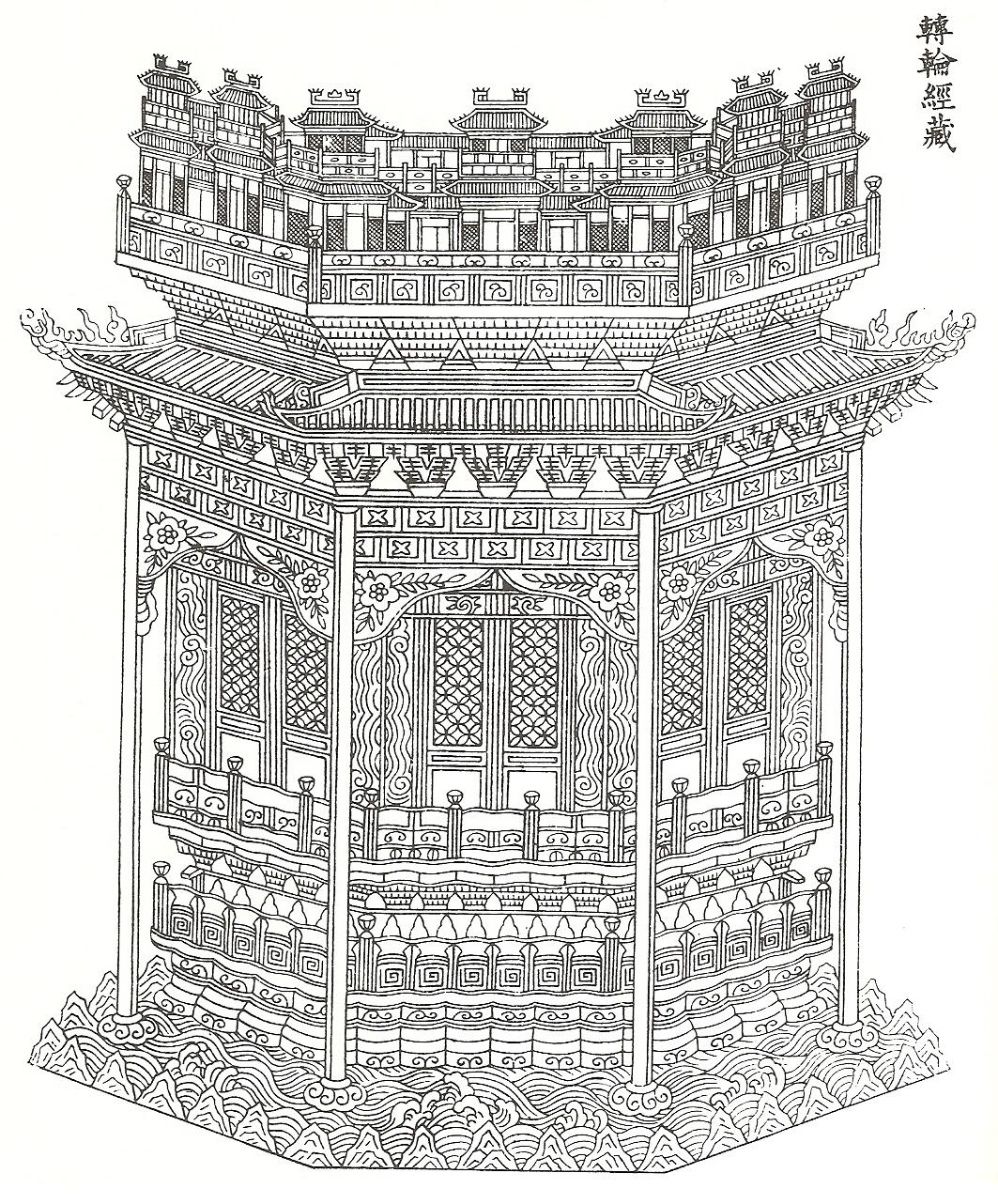
Illustration of a revolving Buddhist sutra case, from the Yingzao Fashi (1103)

=== Dongjing Meng Hua Lu ===
The Dongjing Meng Hua Lu ('A Dream of Splendors Past in the Eastern Capital'), a memoir and city chronicle published by Meng Yuanlao in 1147, recounts his experiences in Kaifeng during the 1120s and offers vital information about the layout of the capital city and Song cityscapes more broadly. It includes intricate details about city walls, bridges, palaces, government offices, streets, lanes, markets, eateries, pavilions, and shops. The narrative allows the reader to imagine the scenery as if they are walking through the city, noting important landmarks and observing various sites. The Ducheng Jisheng written in 1235 and the Mengliang Lu written in 1274 provide subsequent detailed descriptions of urban environments during the Southern Song era, particularly Lin'an, now modern Hangzhou.

== Architecture in Song artwork ==
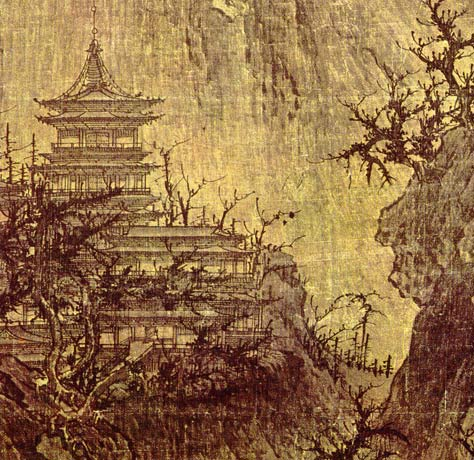
Detail of a mountain temple, from a vertical scroll landscape painting (c. 919–967)

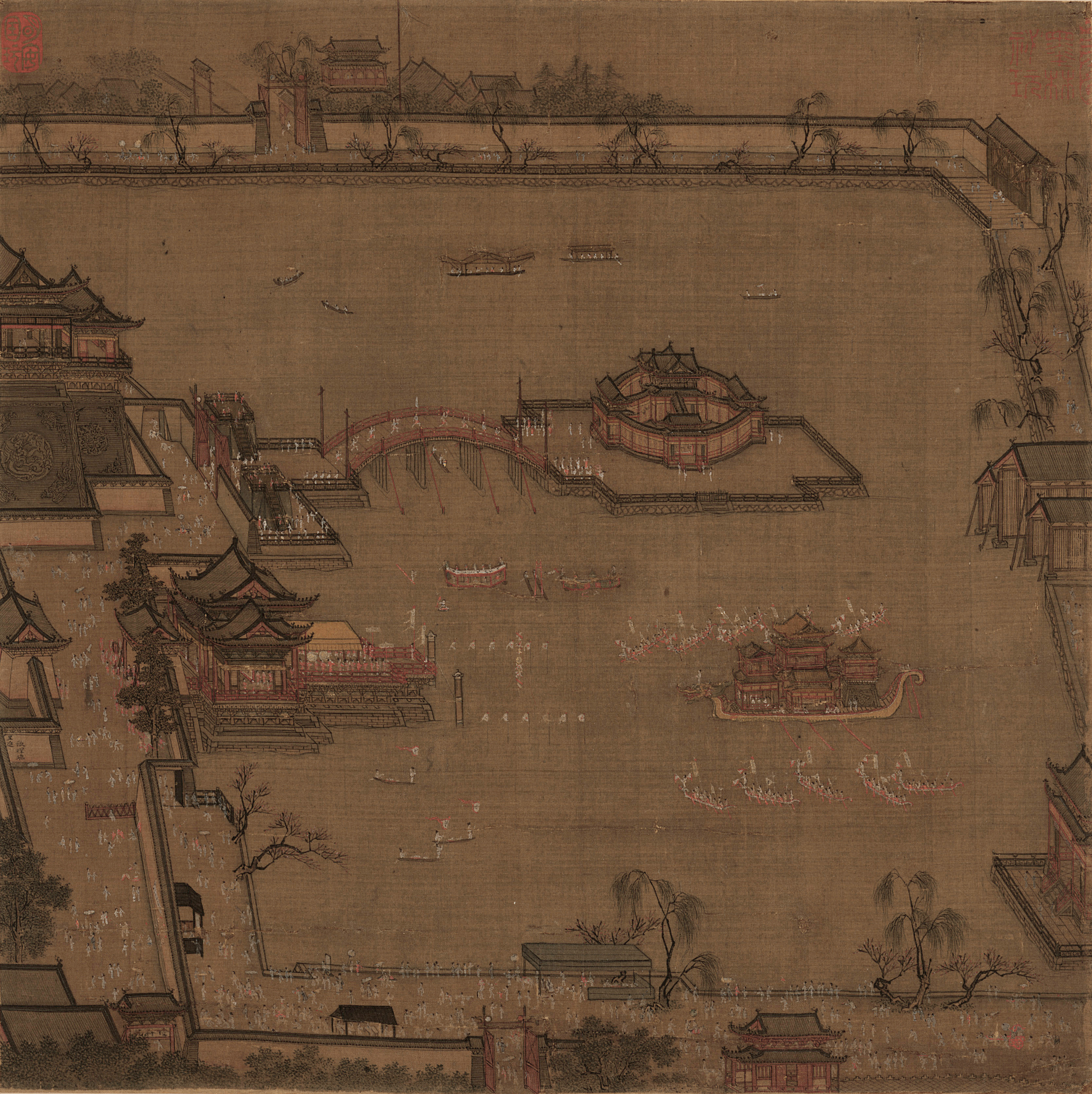
Games in the Jinming Pool, a painting by Zhang Zeduan depicting Kaifeng, the Northern Song capital

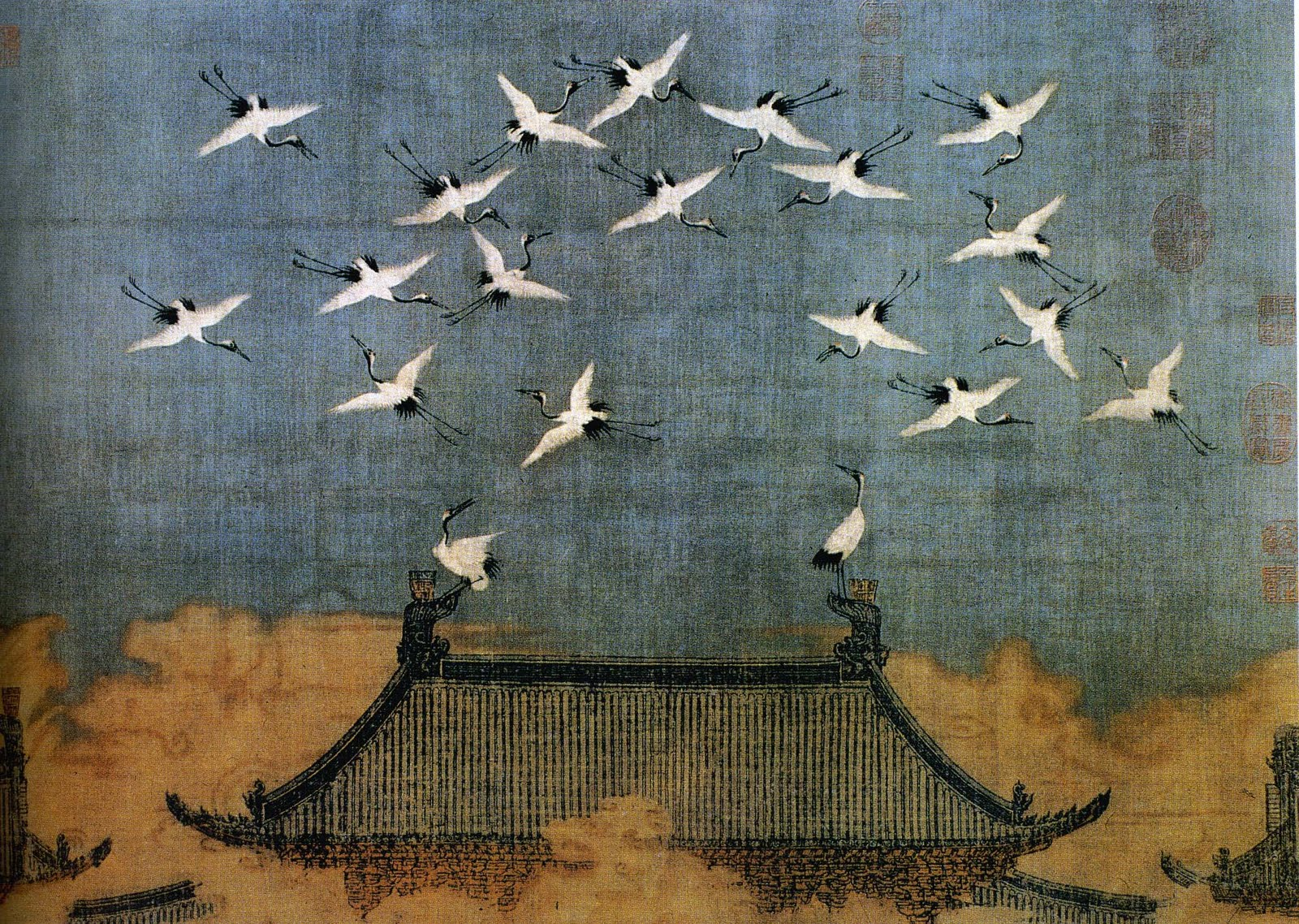
A Kaifeng palace rooftop visited by cranes, by Emperor Huizong of Song (r. 1100–1126)

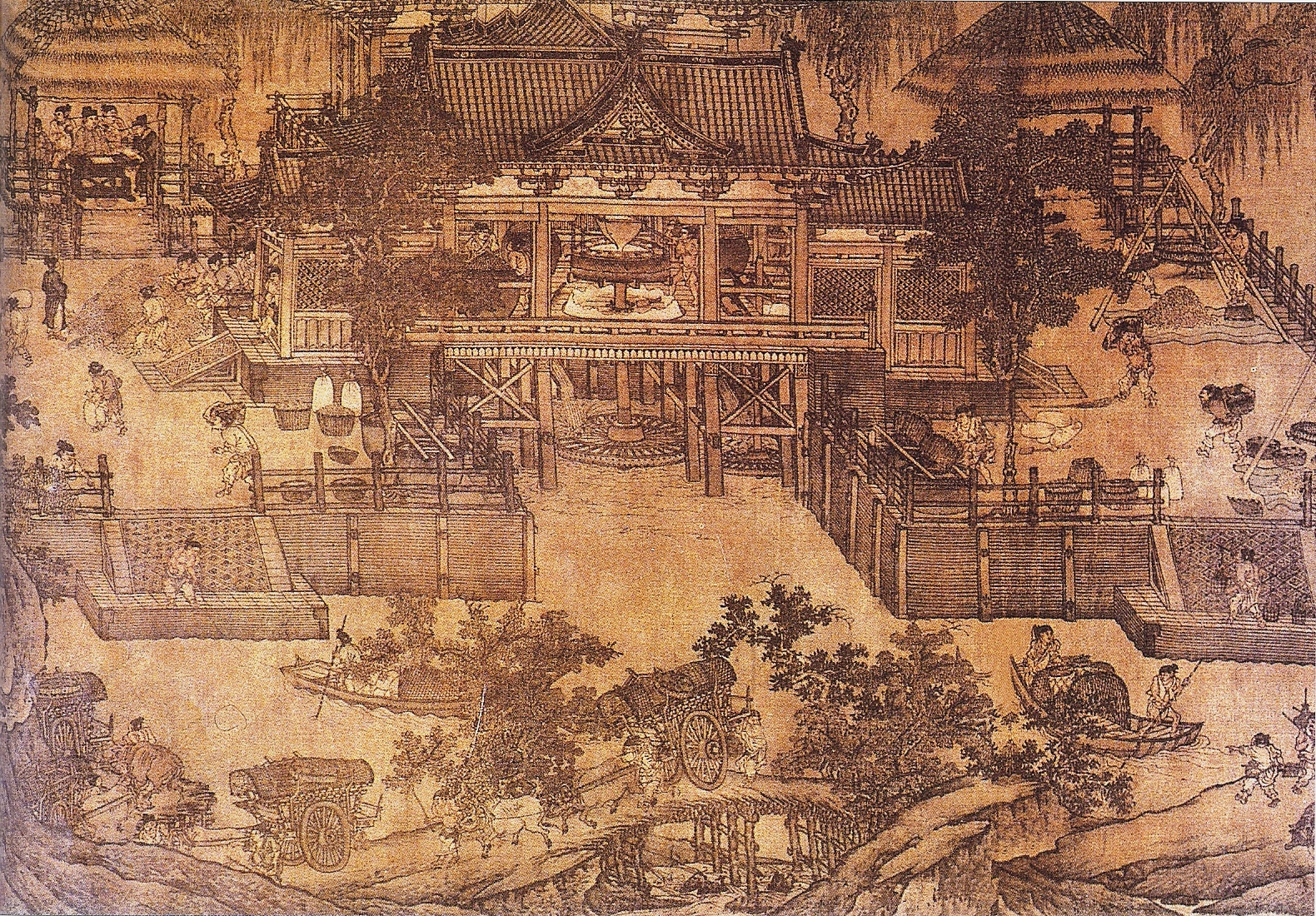
Northern Song era water-powered grain mill

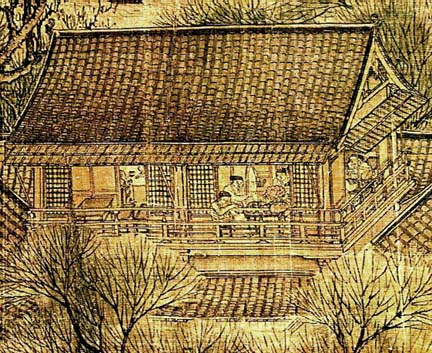
Detail of a teahouse from Along the River During Qingming Festival by Zhang Zeduan (1085–1145)

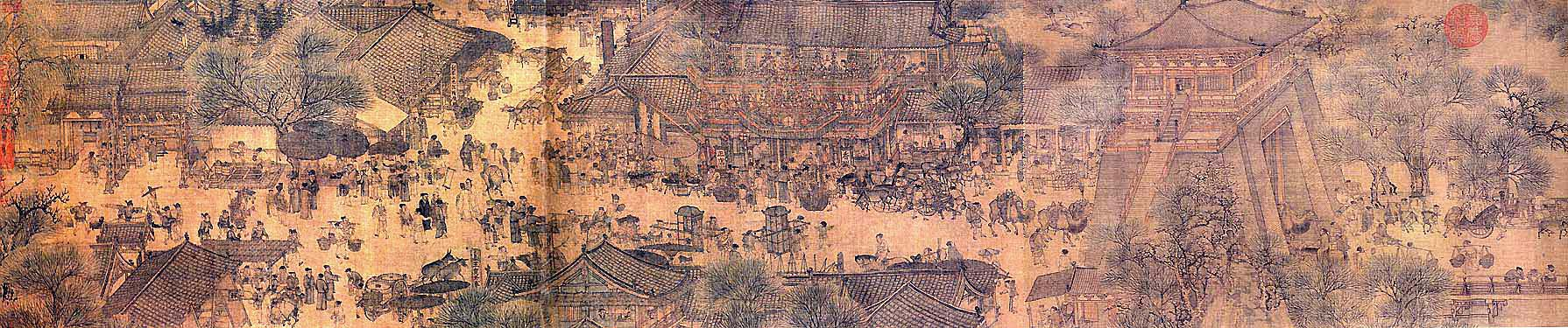
From the same painting by Zhang Zeduan: a wider scene of urban buildings with a large gatehouse to the right

== See also ==
- Ancient Chinese urban planning
- Architecture of the Ming dynasty
- Chinese architecture
- Caihua
- Chinese Palaces
- List of Chinese inventions
- Early and simple domes

== Sources ==
- Cai, Yanxin (2011) [2010], Chinese Architecture, Cambridge & New York: Cambridge University Press (first published by China Intercontinental Press), ISBN 978-0-521-18644-5
- Chang, Yibin; Dai, Jian (2023). "Parameter Analysis on Longitudinal Lateral Force Resistance of Song Dynasty Timber Frame with Panjian". BioResources. 18 (2): 2773–2788. doi:10.15376/biores.18.2.2773-2788.
- Chen, Minhui; Wu, Zhanjing; Dong, Jinshuang (2025). "Dynamic Performance and Seismic Response Analysis of Ming Dynasty Masonry Pagodas in the Jiangnan Region: A Case Study of the Great Wenfeng Pagoda". Buildings. 15 (21): 3994 (1–21). doi:10.3390/buildings15213994.
- Demiéville, Paul (1986), "Philosophy and religion from Han to Sui", in Twitchett, Denis; Loewe, Michael (eds.), Cambridge History of China: Volume I: the Ch'in and Han Empires, 221 B.C. – A.D. 220, Cambridge University Press, pp. 808–872, ISBN 978-0-521-24327-8.
- Guo, Qinghua (1998). "Yingzao Fashi: Twelfth-Century Chinese Building Manual". Architectural History. 41: 1–13. doi:10.2307/1568644. JSTOR 1568644. S2CID 192365949.
- Kang, Qi; Huang, Mingjin (2025). "Study on the Evolution of Private Garden Architecture During the Song Dynasty". Buildings. 15 (8): 1323 (1–23). doi:10.3390/buildings15081323.
- Liang, Sicheng (1984). A Pictorial History of Chinese Architecture: A study of the Development of its Structural System and the Evolution of its Types. MIT Press. ISBN 978-0-262-12103-3.
- Needham, Joseph (1965). Science and civilisation in China, Vol. 4: Physics and Physical Technology, Part 2: Mechanical Engineering. Cambridge: Cambridge University Press. ISBN 9780521058032.
- Needham, Joseph (1971). Science and civilisation in China, Vol. 4: Physics and Physical Technology, Part 3: Civil Engineering and Nautics (1978 Caves Books, Ltd. Reprint ed.). Cambridge: Cambridge University Press. ISBN 0-521-07060-0.
- Meng, Yuan Lao (2007) [1126-1147]. Yi Yongwen (ed.). Dongjin Meng Hua Lu (A Reminiscence of the Glory of Bianjin), Vol. 1: The Outer City of East Capital (in Chinese). Beijing: 中華書局 (Zhonghua Book Company). ISBN 978-7-101-04779-0.
- Schinz, Alfred (1996). The Magic Square: Cities in Ancient China. Stuttgart, London, Sungnam (South Korea): Edition Axel Menges, Daehan Printing & Publishing Co., Ltd. ISBN 3930698021.
- Steinhardt, Nancy Shatzman (1993). "The Tangut Royal Tombs near Yinchuan". Muqarnas. 10: 369–381. doi:10.2307/1523201. JSTOR 1523201.
- Sullivan, Michael; Silbergeld, Jerome; Liu, Qiyi (2022). "The Song (960–1279), Liao (907–1125), and Jin (1115–1234) dynasties". Encyclopedia Britannica. Chinese architecture in stylistic and historical development from 220 to 1206 CE.
- von Glahn, Richard (2003). "Towns and Temples: Urban Growth and Decline in the Yangzi Delta, 1100-1400". In Smith, Paul Jakov; von Glahn, Richard (eds.). The Song-Yuan-Ming Transition in Chinese History. Cambridge, Mass.: Harvard University Asia Center, Harvard University Press. pp. 176–211. ISBN 978-0-674-01096-3.
- Yang, Wantian (2025). "The shaping of cityscape and imagination: Song Dynasty urban pavilions along the streets". Journal of Asian Architecture and Building Engineering. 24 (6): 4771–4786. doi:10.1080/13467581.2024.2421239. ISSN 1346-7581. OCLC 11008275216.
