= Hexi Caihua =

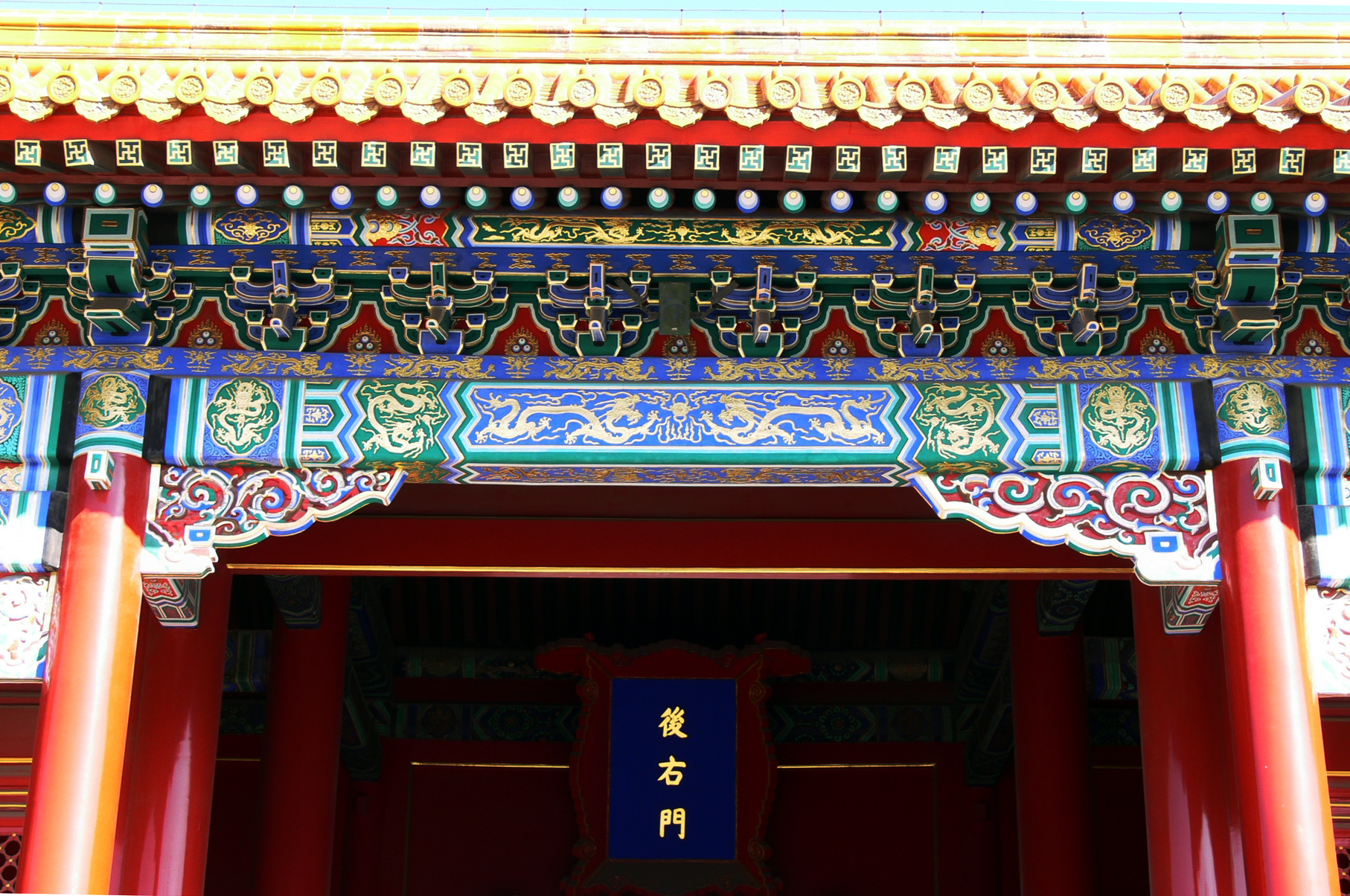
Hexi Caihua in the Forbidden City

Hexi Caihua (Chinese: 和璽彩畫), Hexi painting, or Imperial-style decorative painting, is the royal variation of Caihua, a traditional Chinese decorative painting applied to the surface of the buildings. Historically used only on the most important buildings in Chinese palaces, it features large numbers of golden Chinese dragons on blue and green backgrounds.
