= Caihua =

Traditional Chinese art

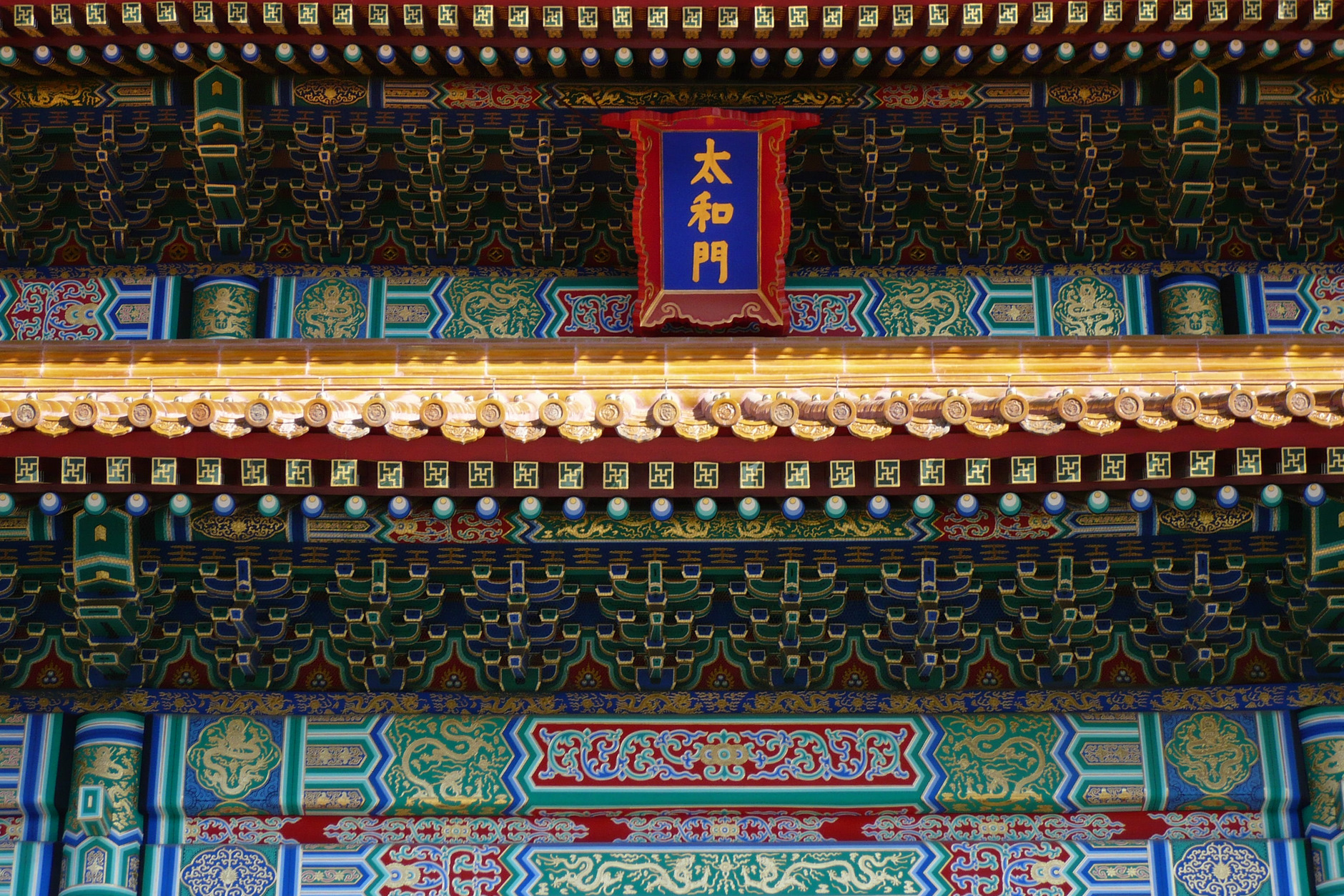
- Caihua of the Forbidden City
- Traditional Chinese: 彩畫
- Simplified Chinese: 彩画
- Literal meaning: "Colour-painting"
Transcriptions
Standard Mandarin
- Hanyu Pinyin: cǎihuà
- IPA: [tsʰàɪ.xwâ]

Caihua (Chinese: 彩畫; pinyin: cǎihuà), or "colour painting", is the traditional Chinese decorative painting or polychrome used for architecture and one of the most notable and important features of historical Chinese architecture. It held a significant artistic and practical role within the development of East-Asian architecture, as Caihua served not only decoration but also protection of the predominantly wooden architecture from various seasonal elements and hid the imperfections of the wood itself. The use of different colours or paintings would be according to the particular building functions and local regional customs, as well as historical periods. The choice of colours and symbology are based on traditional Chinese philosophies of the Five Elements and other ritualistic principles. The Caihua is often separated into three layer structures; timber or lacquer layer, plaster layer, and pigment layer.

== History ==
The origins of Caihua can be traced back to the Zhou dynasty, as the Zuo Zhuan and Guliang Zhuan detailed:

秋，丹桓宮楹。禮，天子、諸侯黝堊，大夫倉，士黈，丹楹，非禮也。 [The Duke painted red the pillars of [Duke] Huan's temple. According to rule, King and royalty use dark and white, gentry use white, yeoman use yellow. Red pillars are against etiquette.]

The Rites of Zhou similarly records a ritualistic usage of motifs and colour, based on each respective aspects' corresponding symbolic value.

== Gallery ==
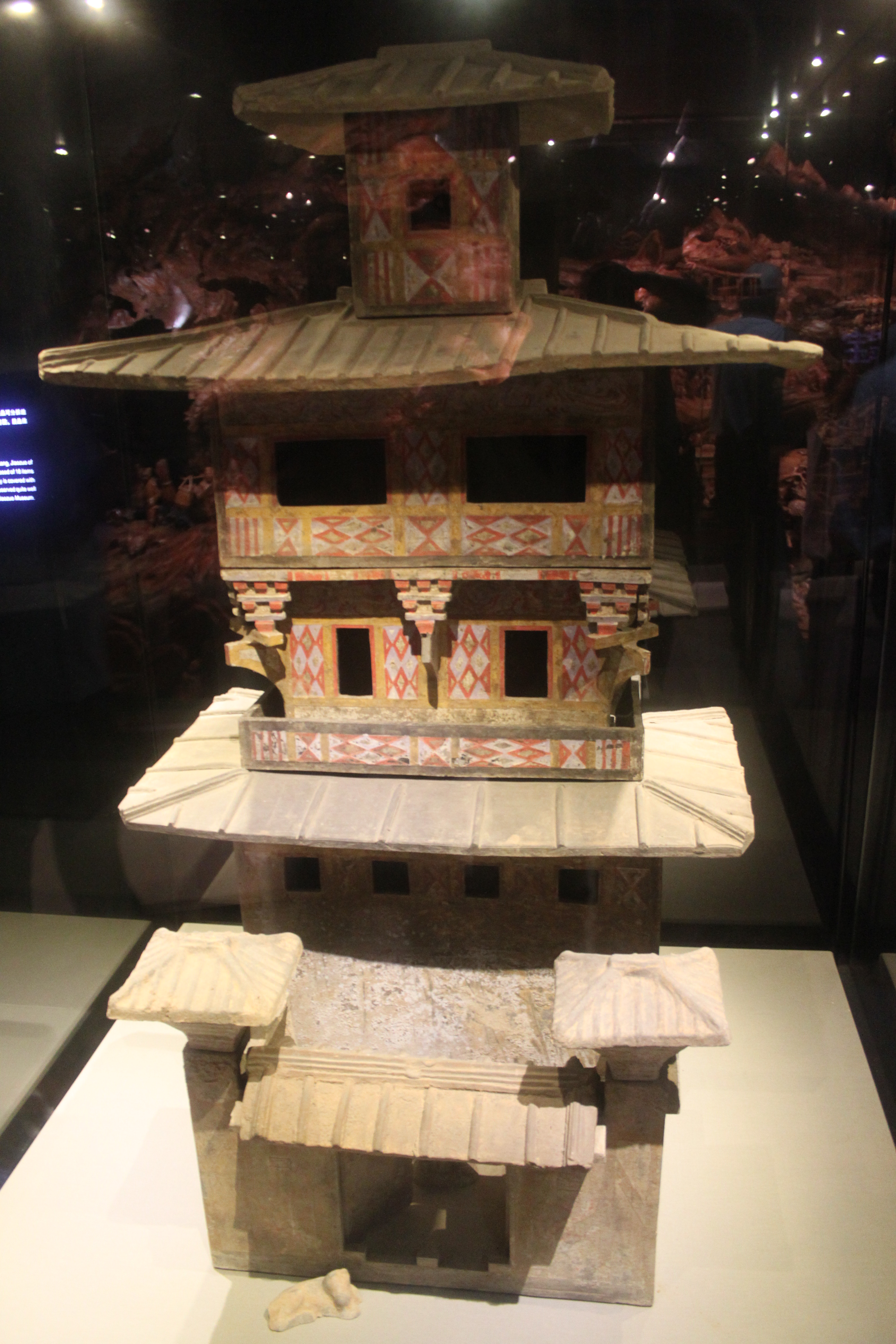
Painted elements can be seen on Han dynasty pottery tower.

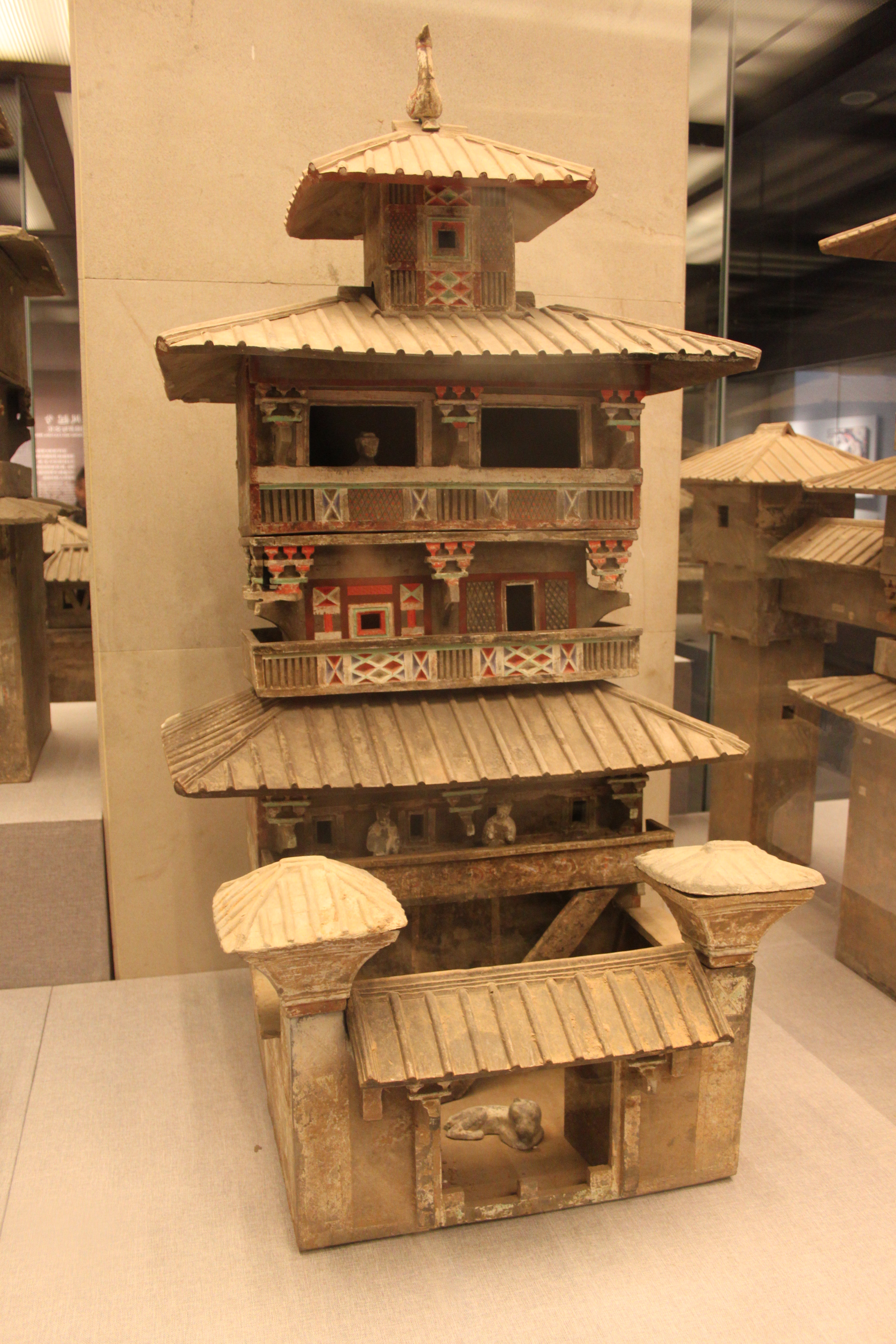
Painted elements can be seen on Han dynasty pottery tower.

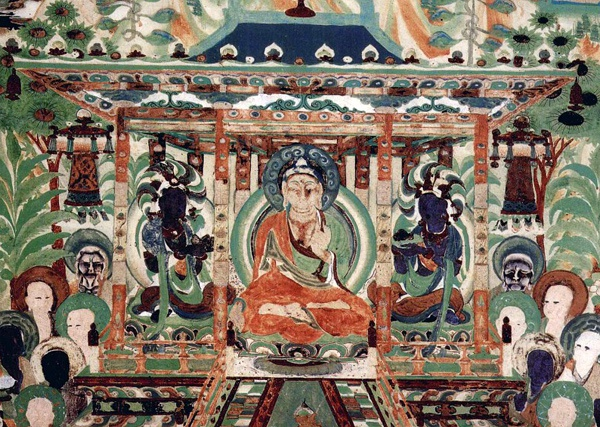
Example of Tang dynasty decorative motifs, from mural of Mogao Caves.

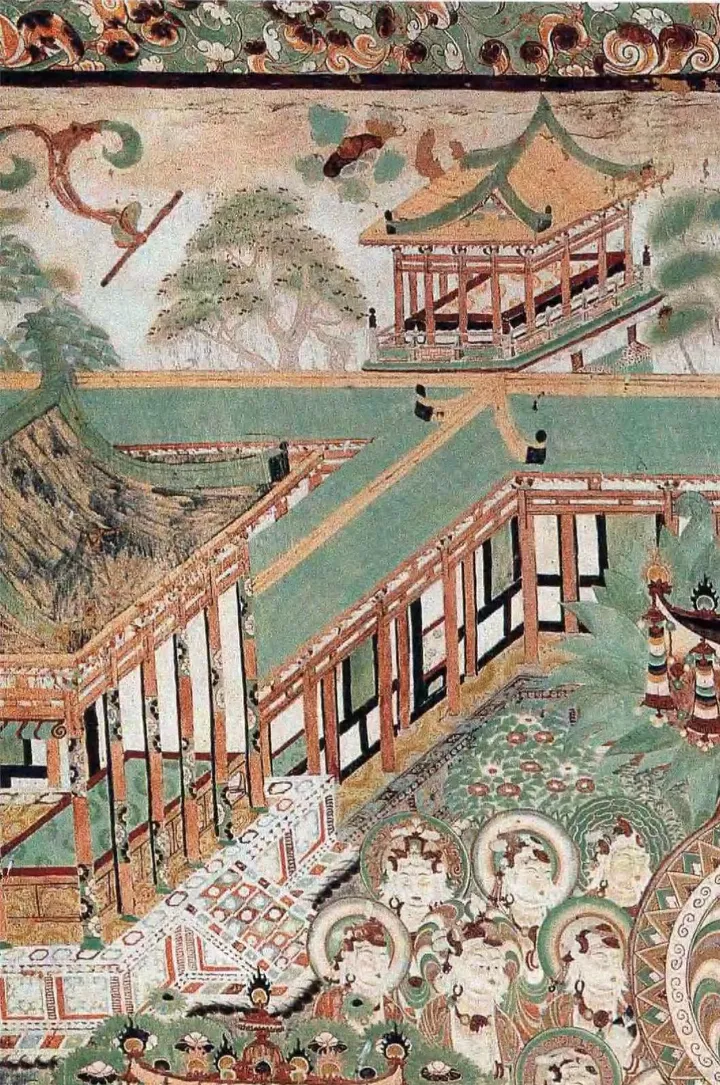
Example of Tang dynasty decorative motifs on architecture, from mural of Mogao Caves.

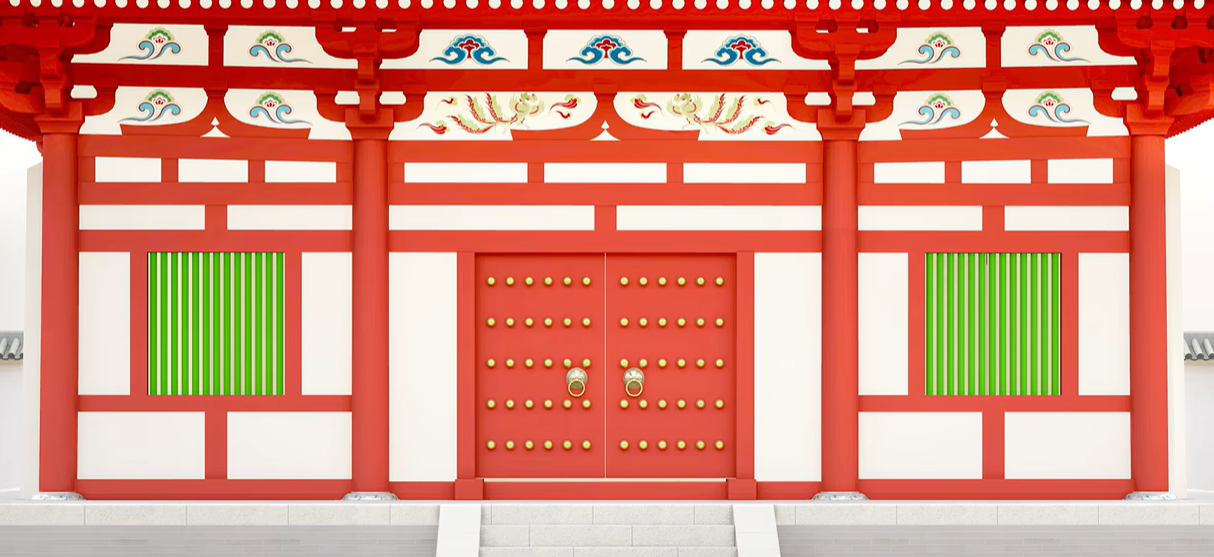
Recreation of Tang dynasty caihua architectural decorations.

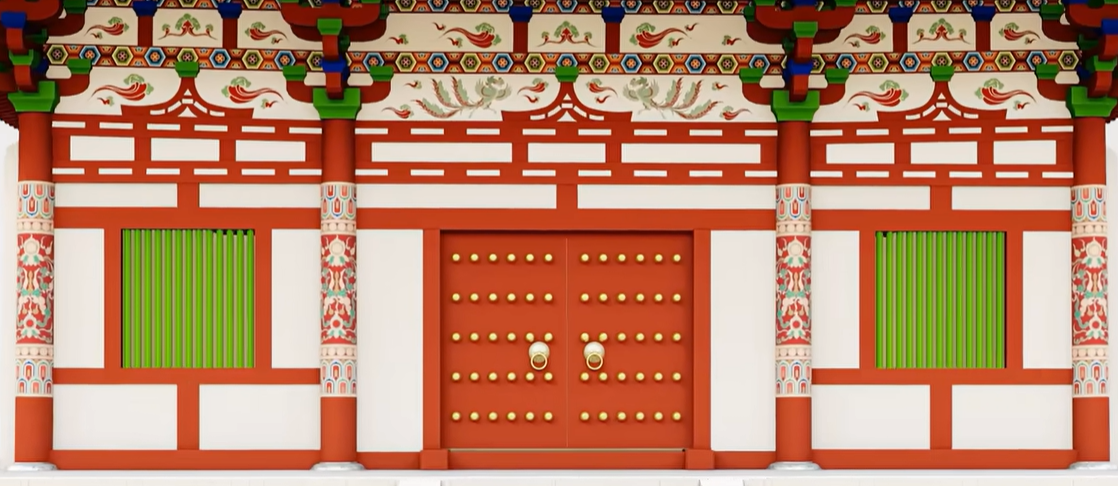
Recreation of Tang dynasty caihua architectural decorations.

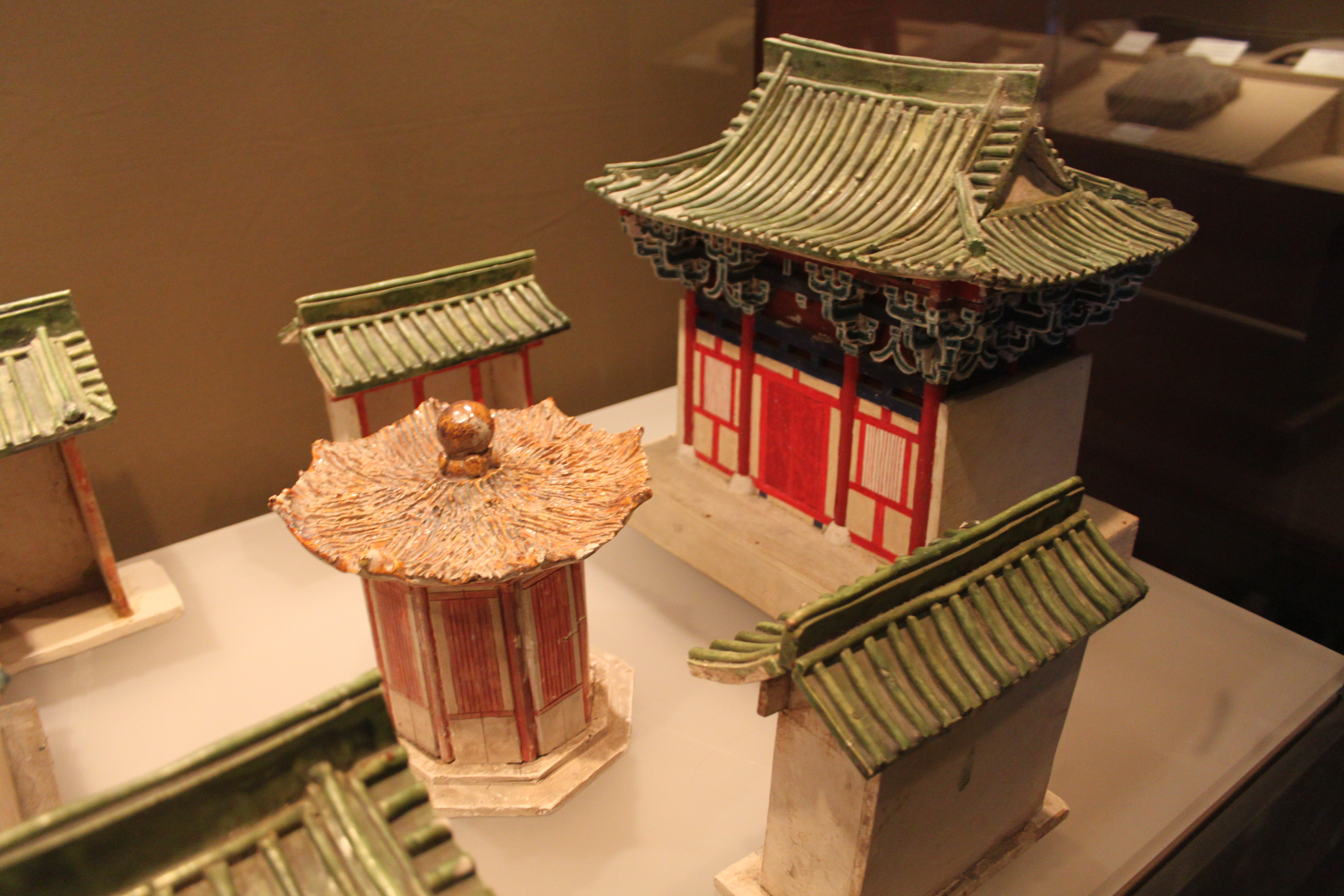
Tang dynasty sancai model of a building.

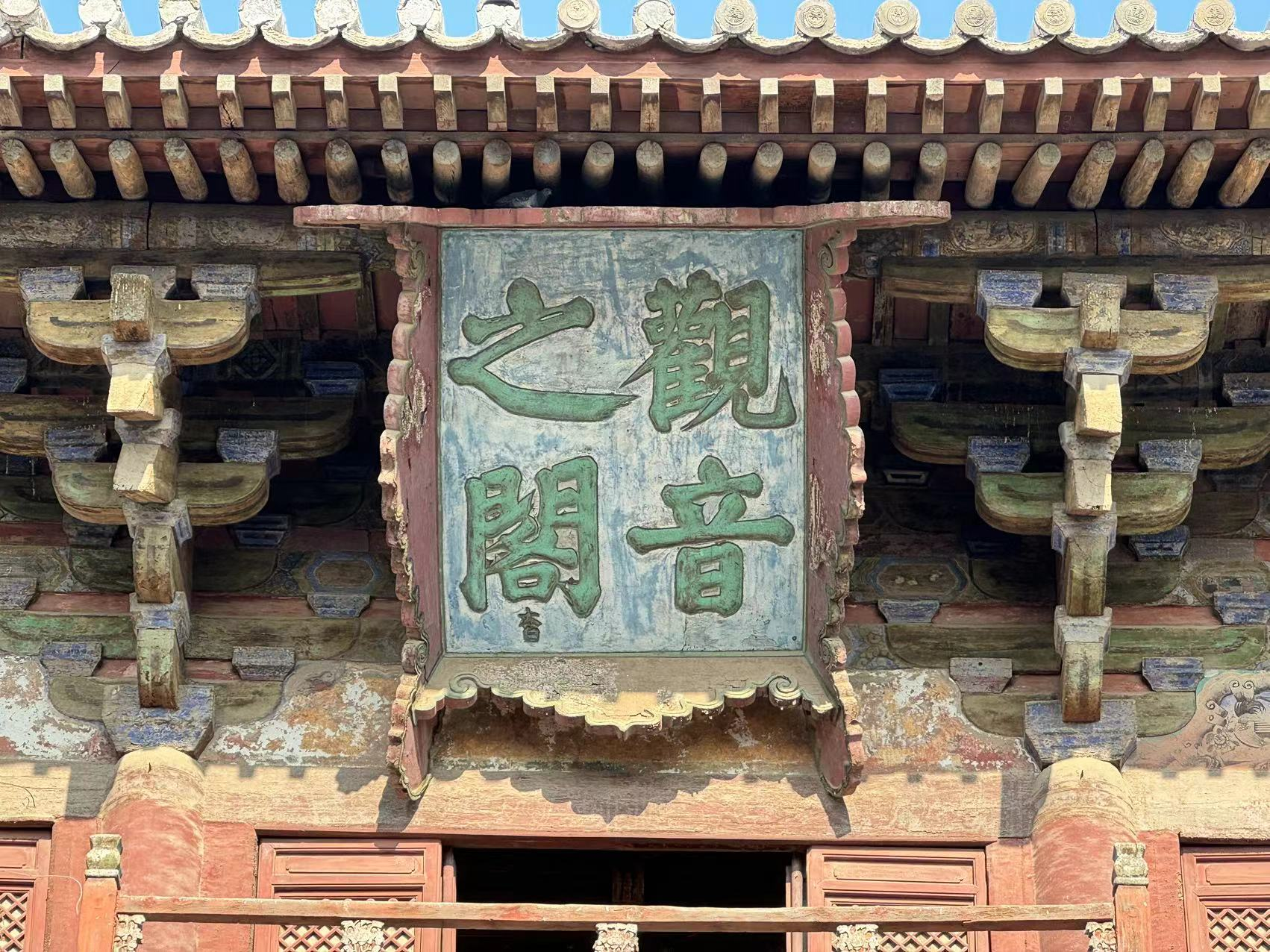
Remnants of Late Tang or Liao dynasty decorations on dougong of Guanyin Pavilion of Dule Temple.

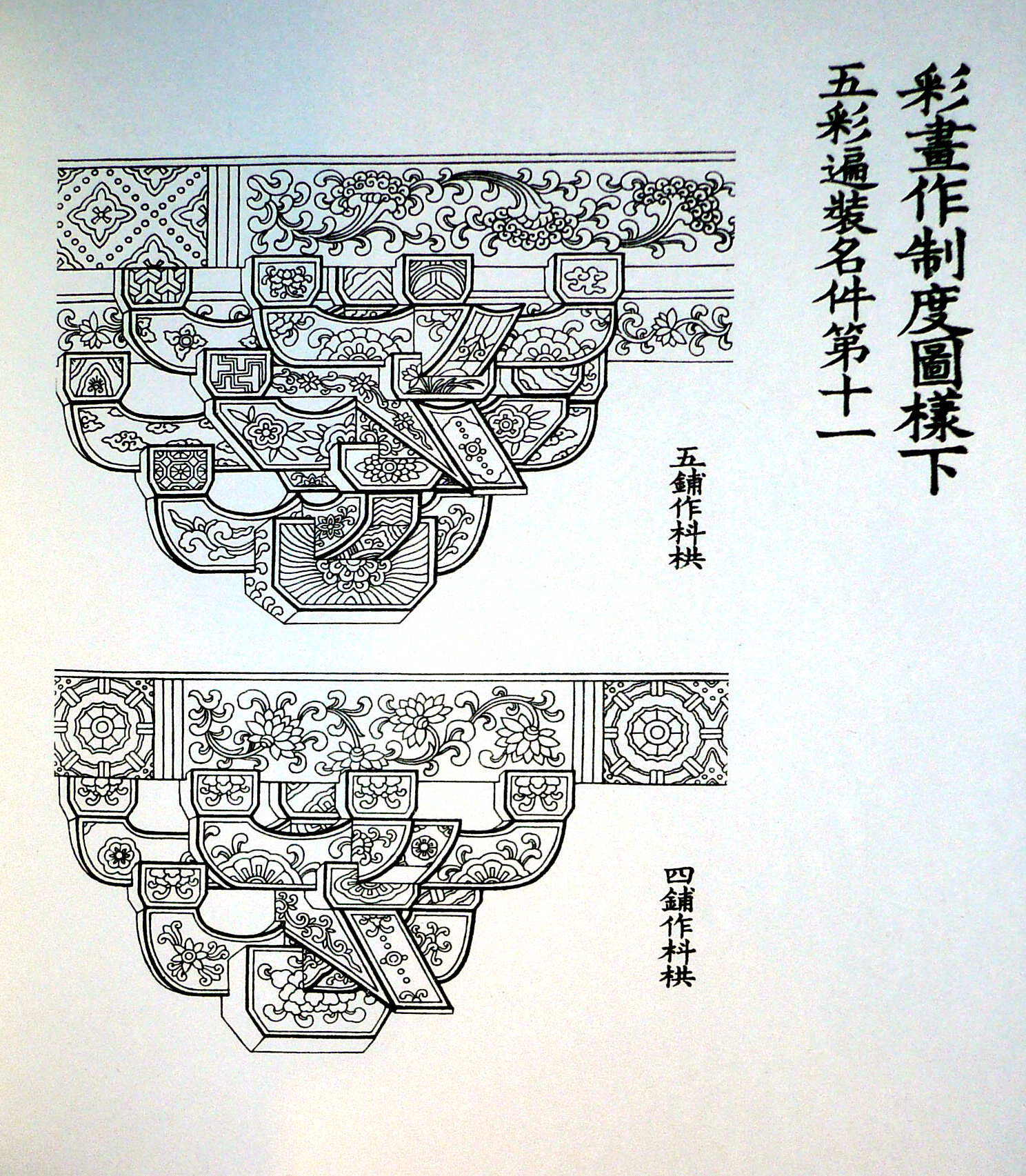
Song Dynasty "Wucai Caihua" (Five Coloured Painting)-dougong decorations guide as detailed on the Yingzao Fashi

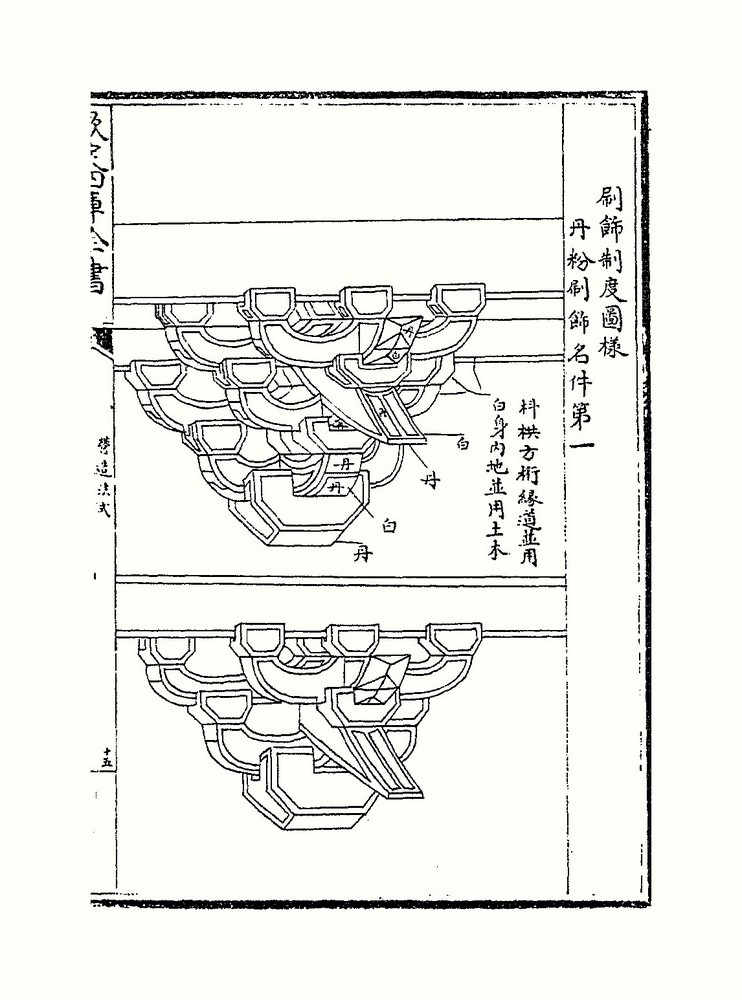
Song Dynasty "Danfen Caihua" (Red and White)-dougong decorations guide as detailed on the Yingzao Fashi.

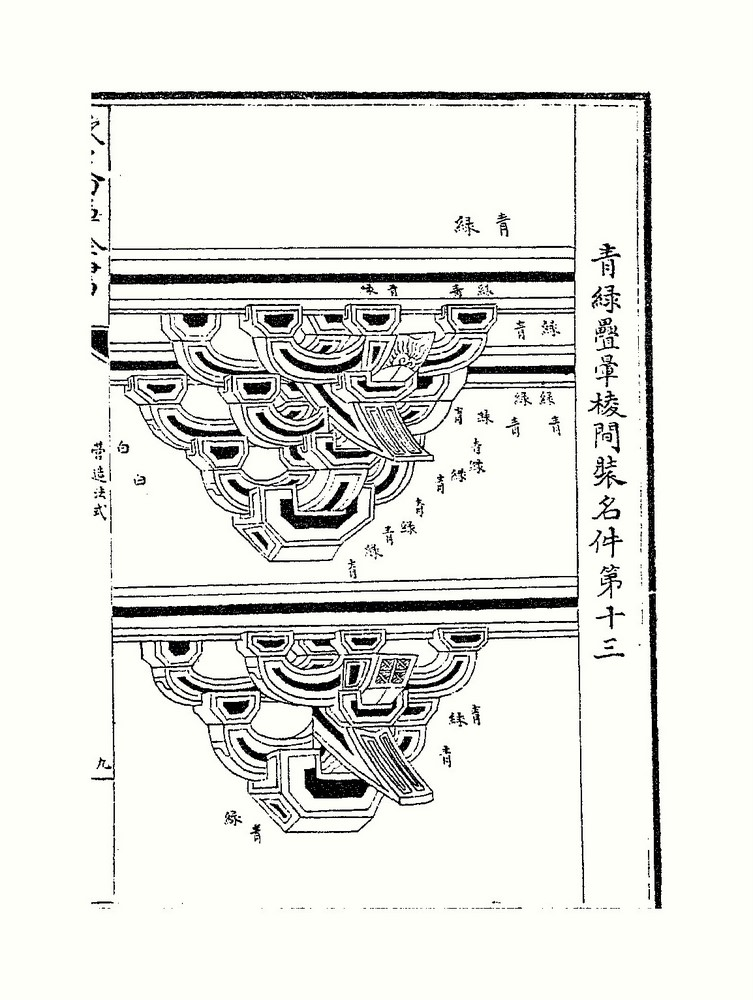
Song Dynasty "Qinglü" (Blue and Green)-decorations guide as detailed on the Yingzao Fashi.

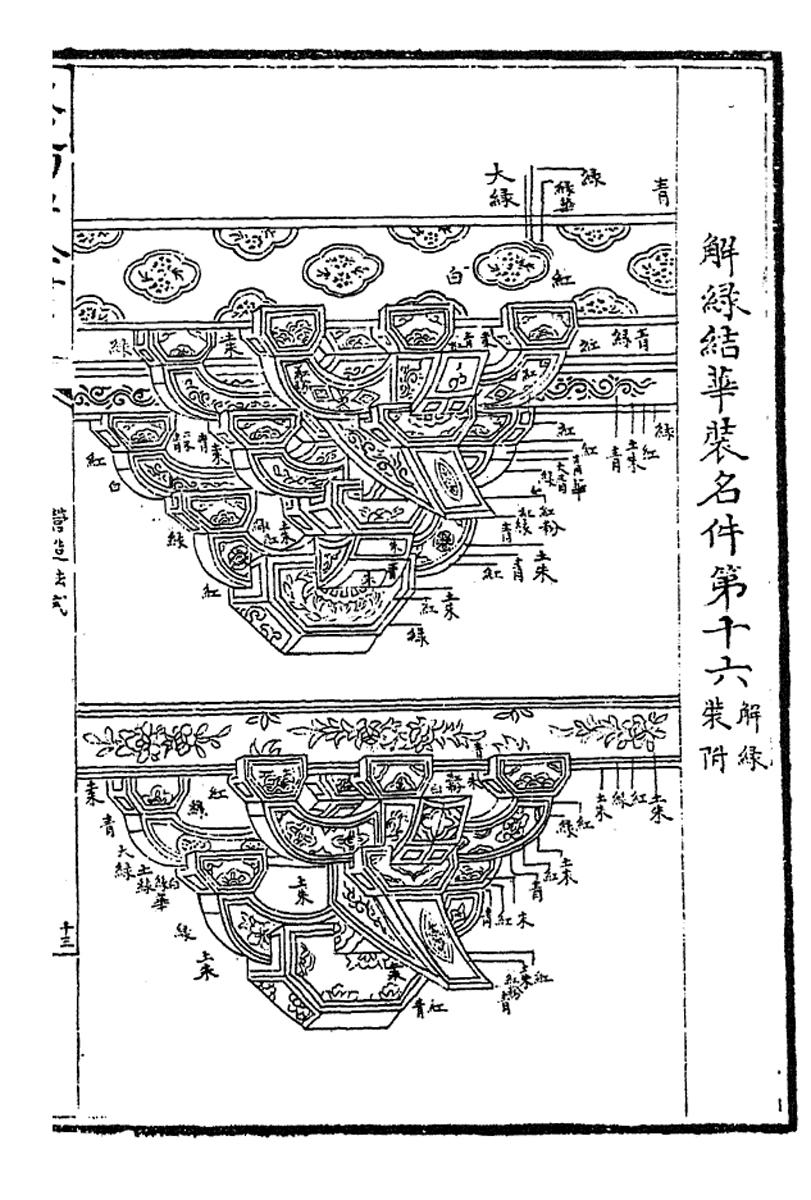
Song Dynasty "Jielü Caihua" (Open Green)-decorations guide as detailed on the Yingzao Fashi.

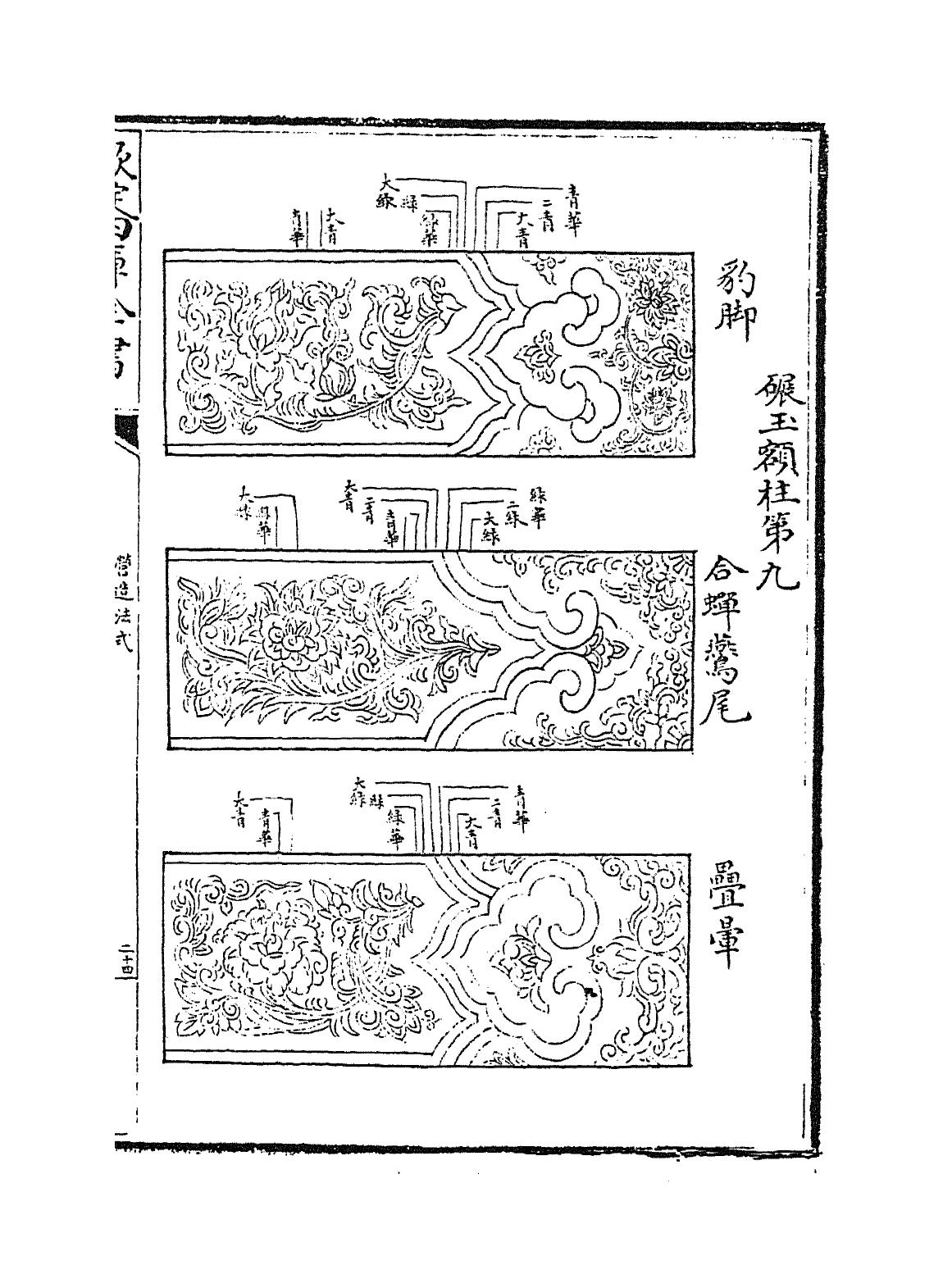
Song Dynasty ruyi-decorations on beams guide from the Yingzao Fashi.

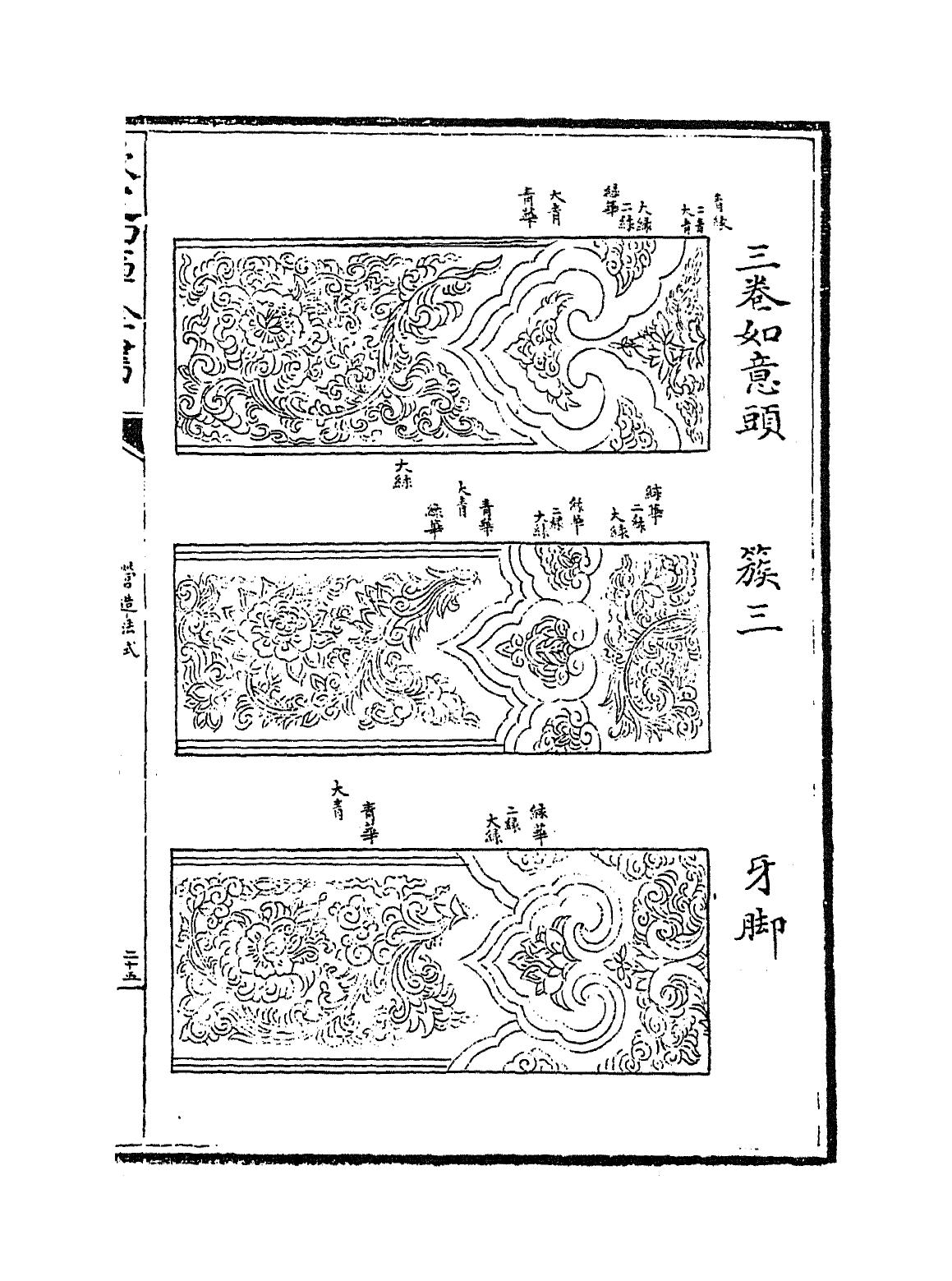
Song Dynasty ruyi-decorations on beams guide from the Yingzao Fashi.

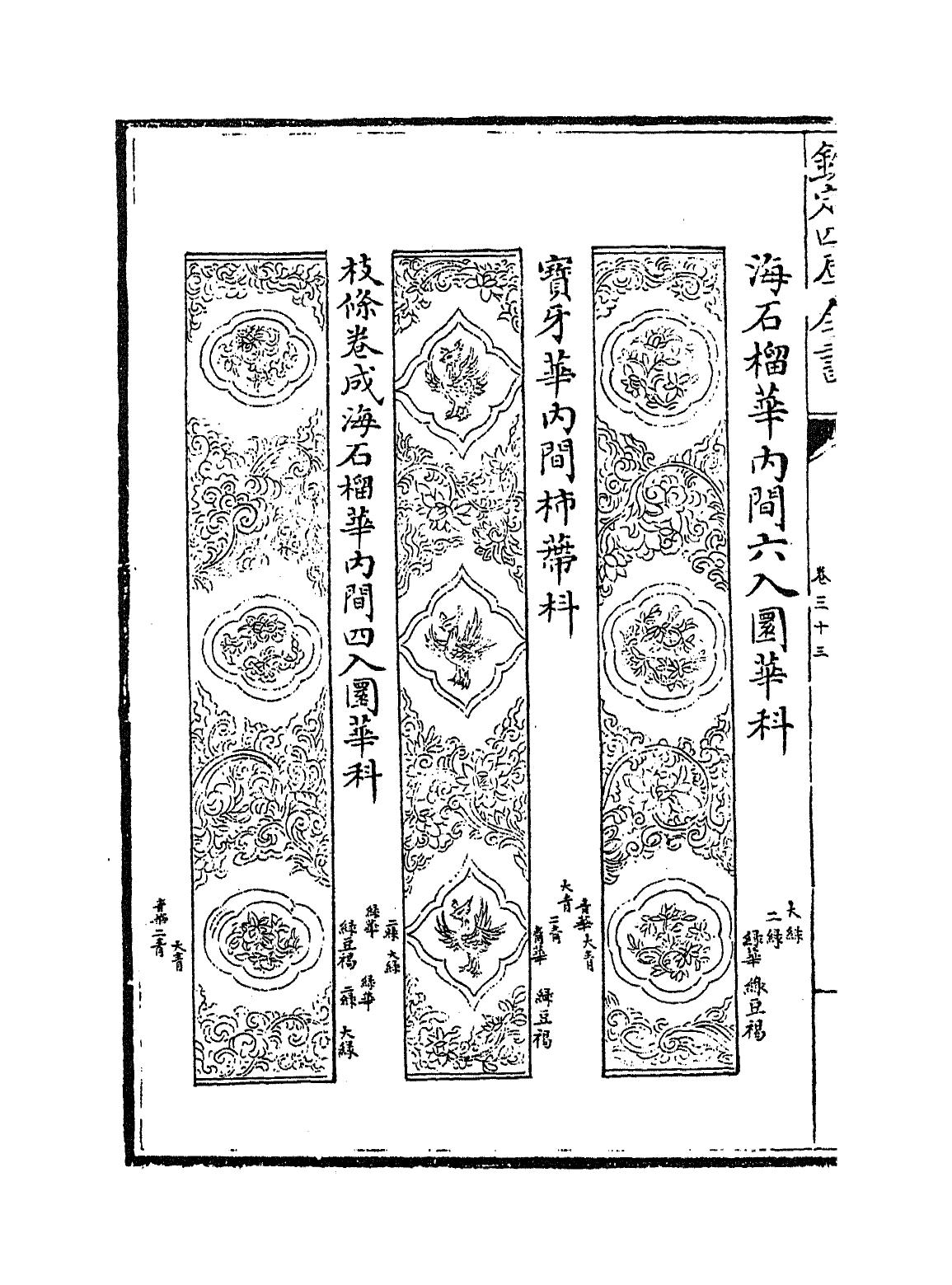
Song Dynasty pillar decorations guide from the Yingzao Fashi.

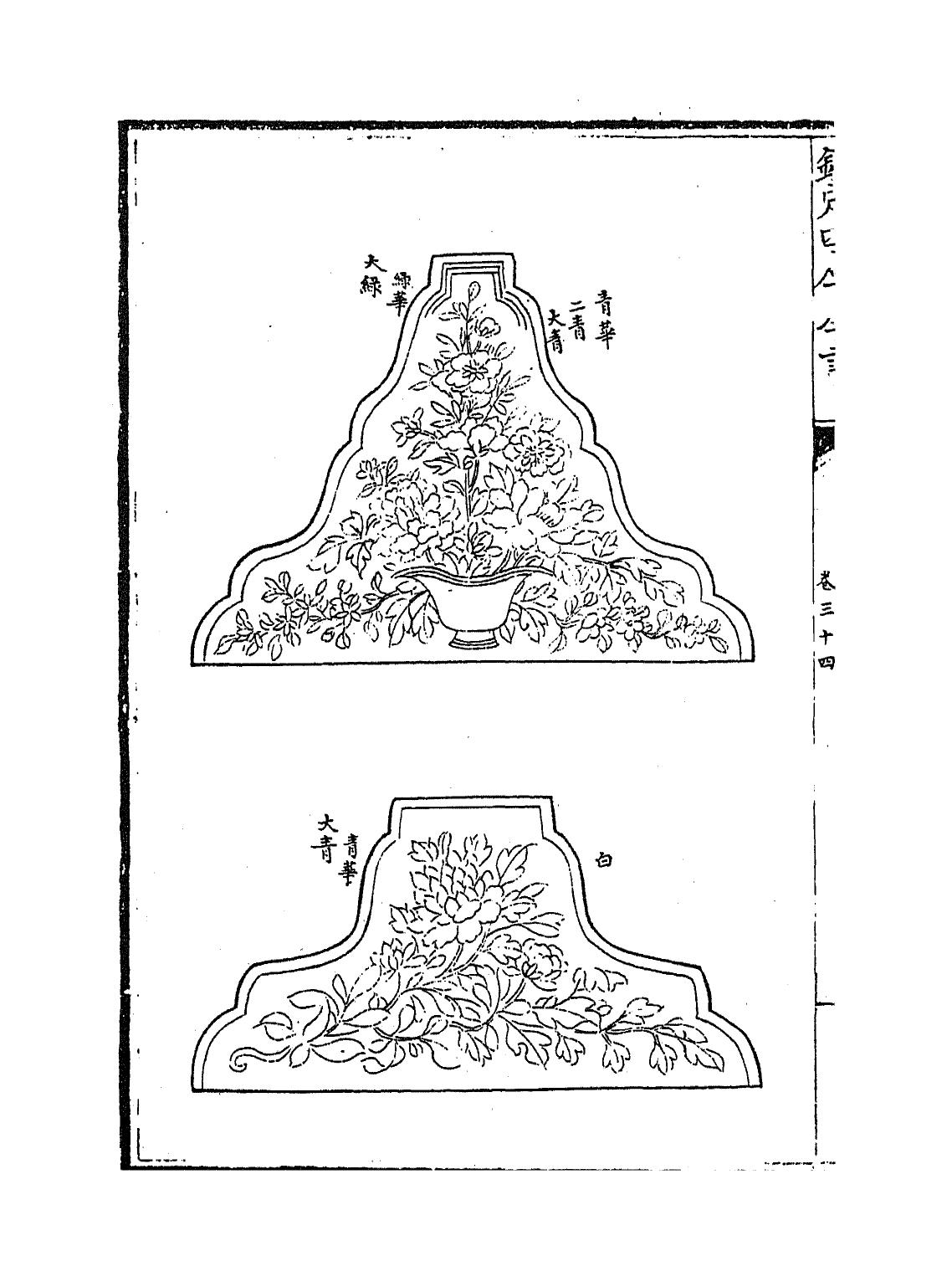
Song Dynasty decorations used in between dougong-brackets guide from the Yingzao Fashi.

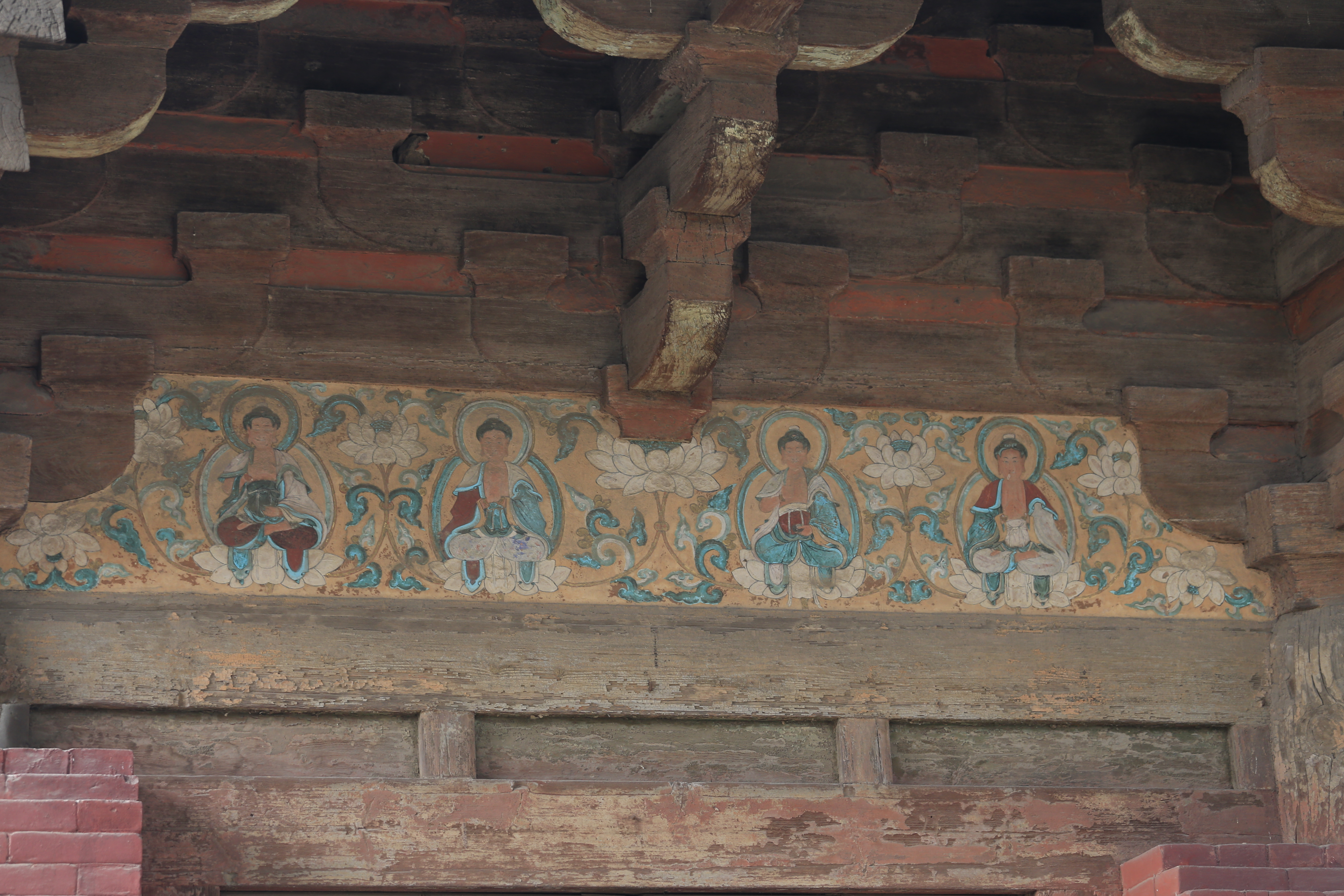
Buddhist decorations of Ten-Thousand Buddha Hall of Zhenguo Temple, Five Dynasties period.

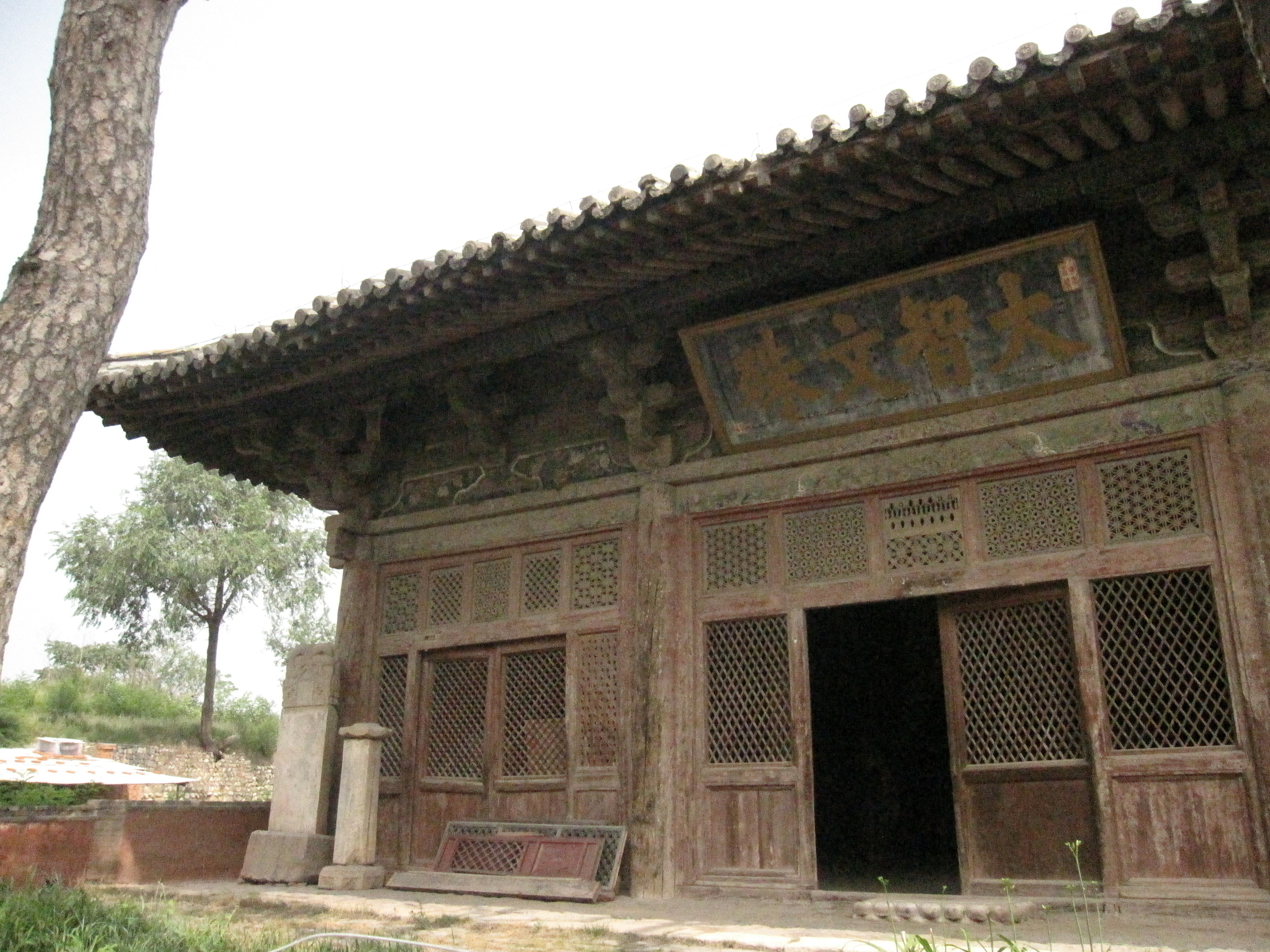
Decorations on Liao dynasty Geyuan Temple.

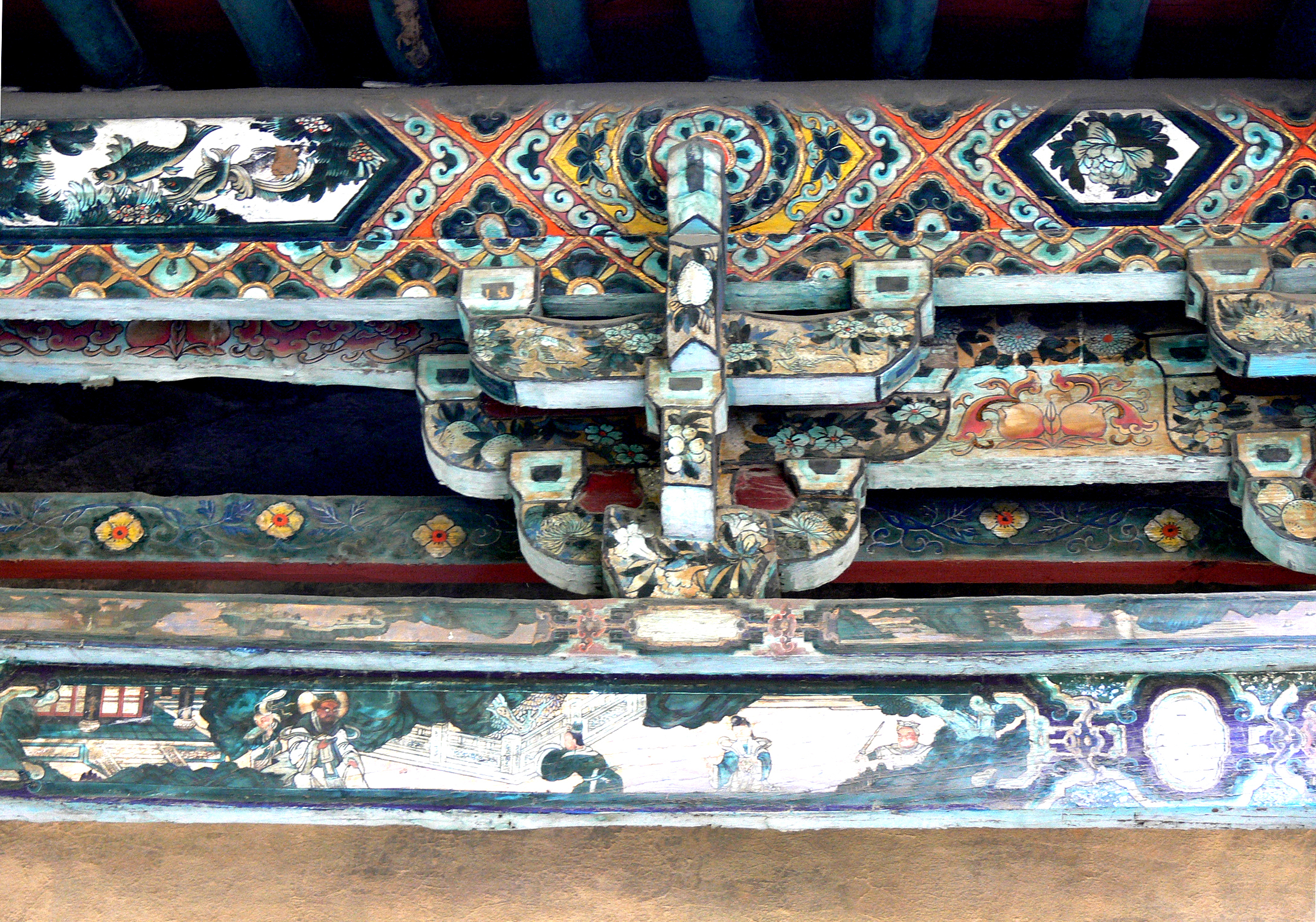
Caihua found on Jinci temple, Song Dynasty.

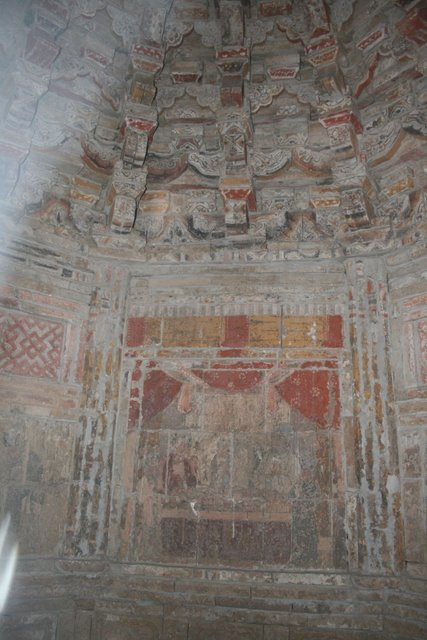
Frescos of Song Silang's Tomb, Northern Song Dynasty.

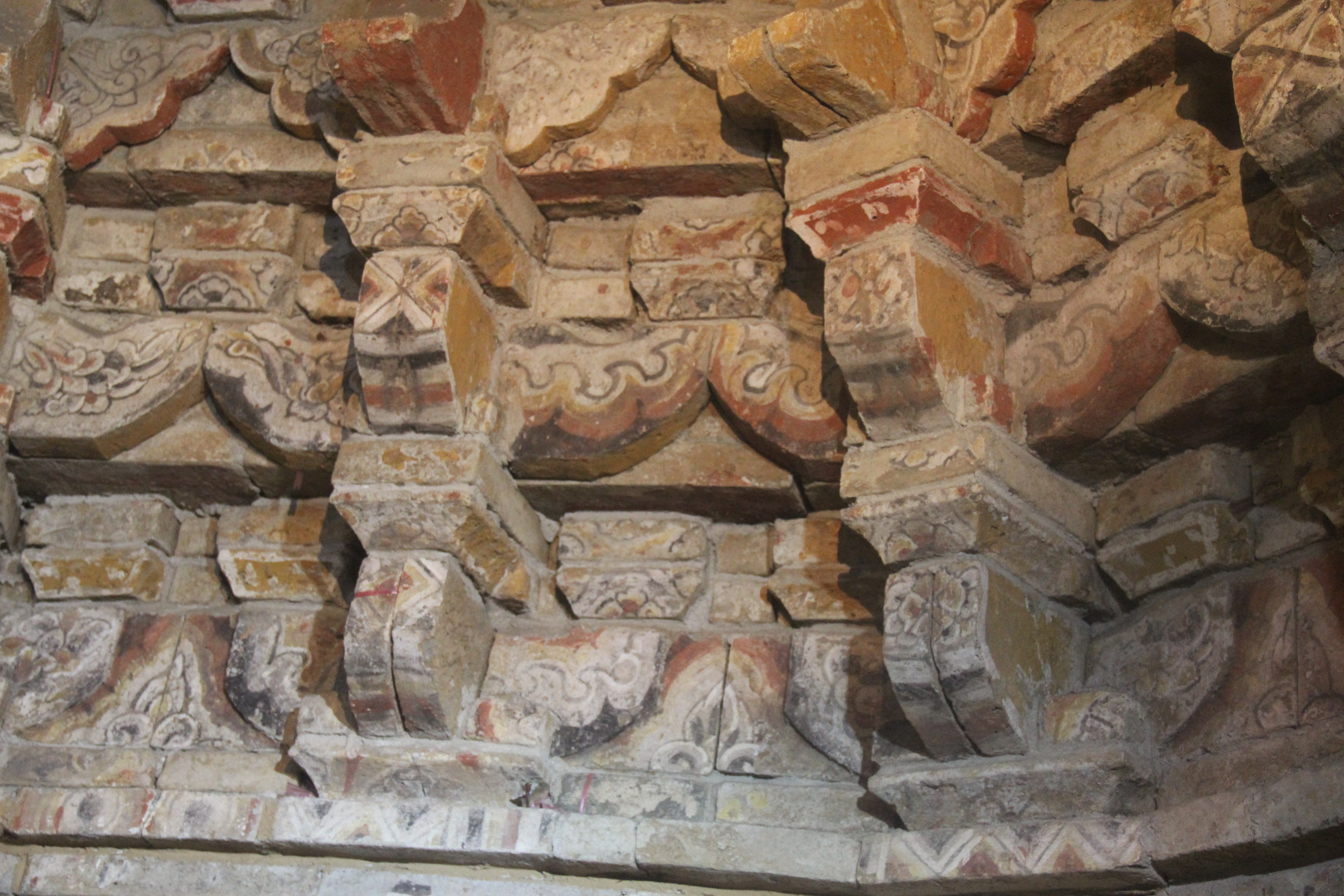
Frescos of Song Silang's Tomb, Northern Song Dynasty.

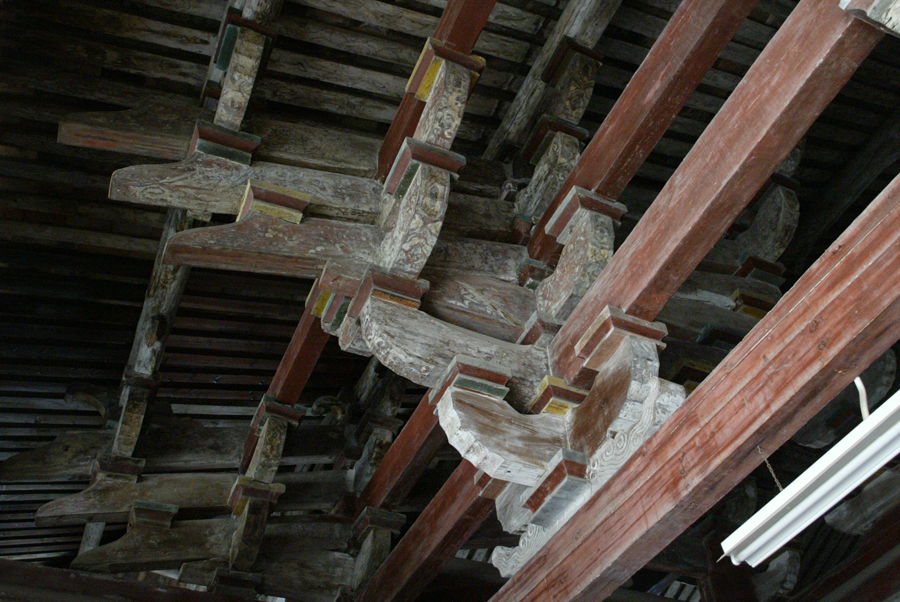
Weathered decorations on Yuanmiao Temple (Putian) dougong. Originally Song dynasty construction.

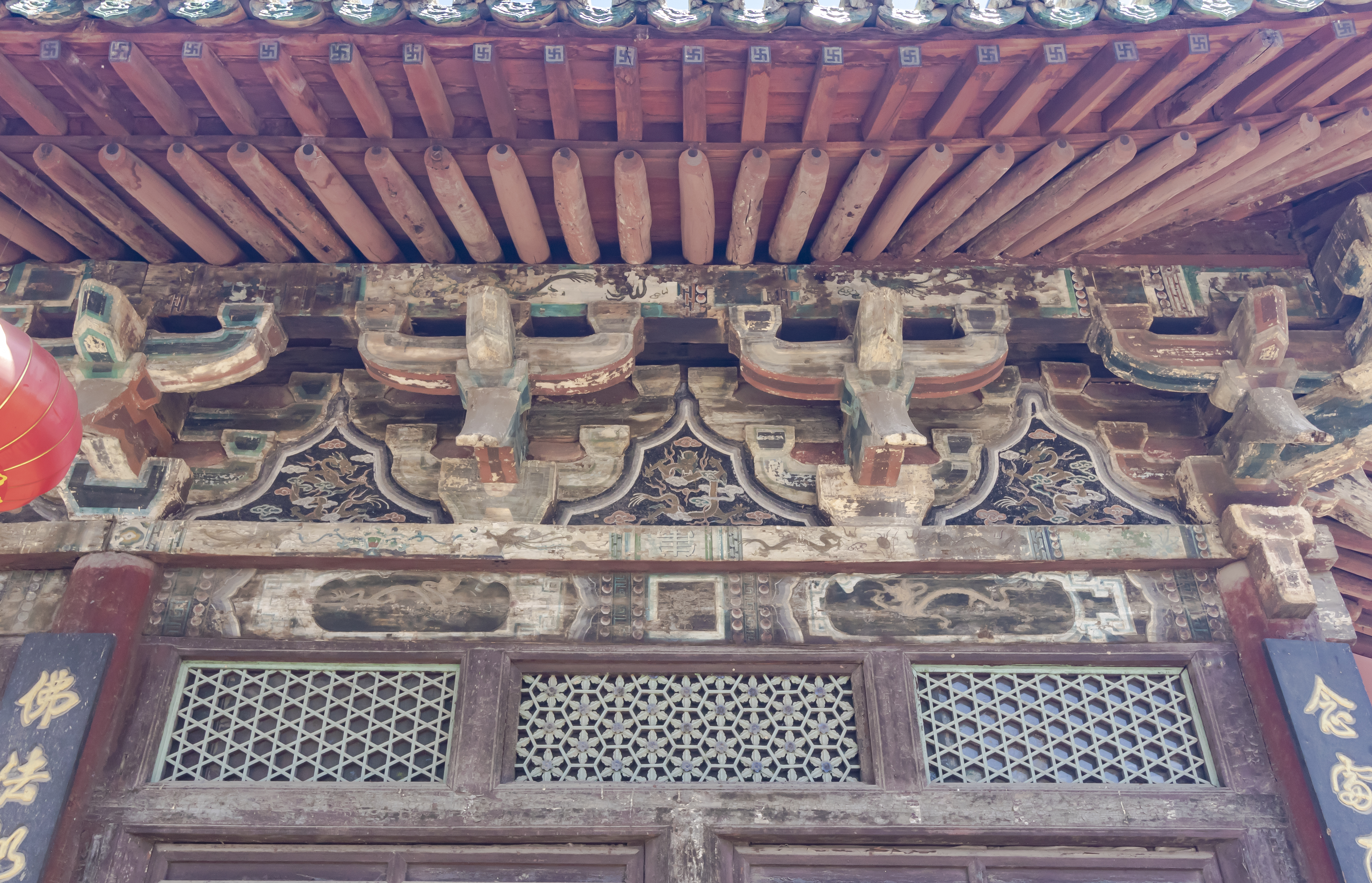
Jin dynasty Jingtu Temple of Shanxi.

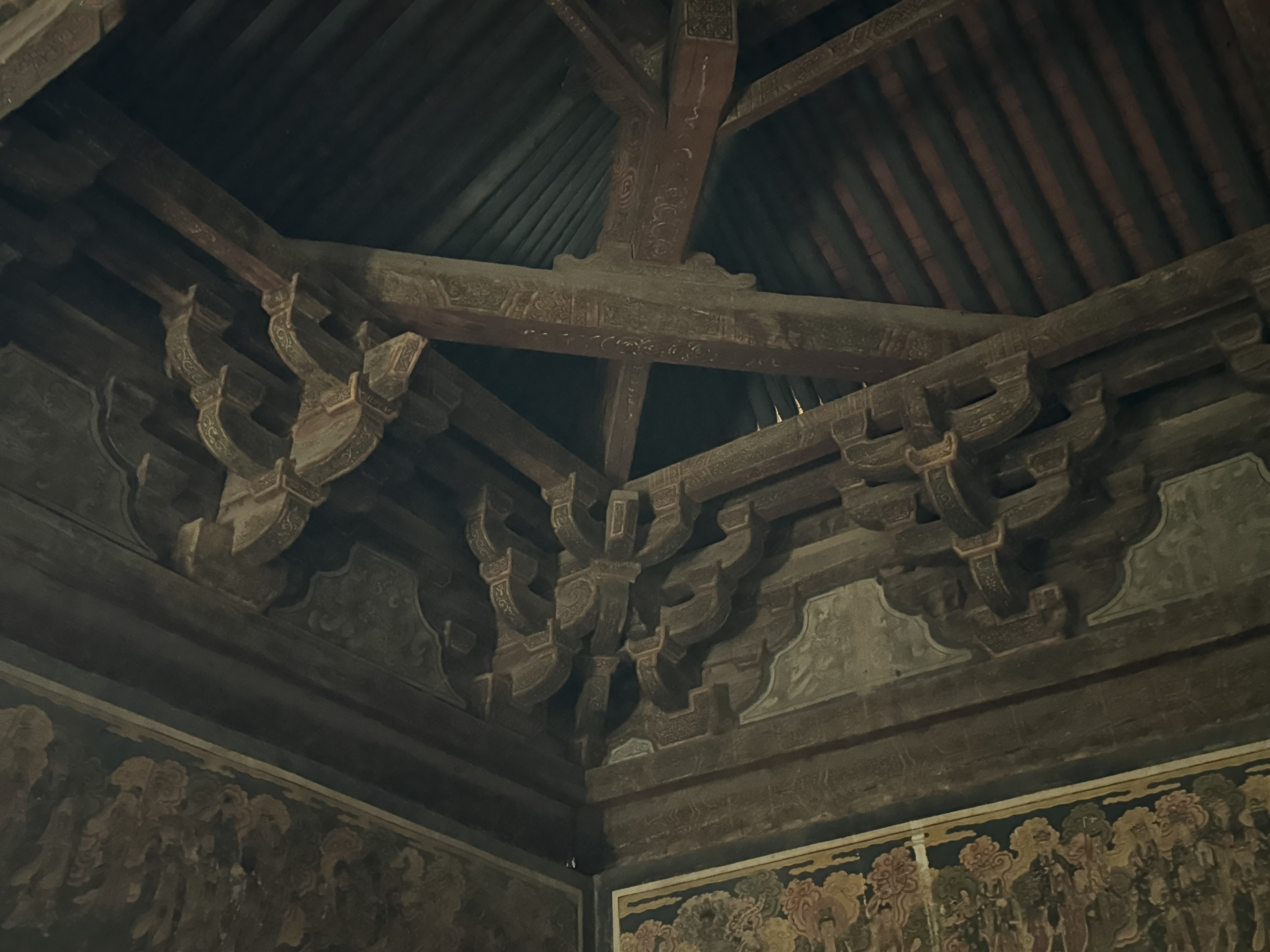
Decorations on corner dougong brackets from inner hall of Yong'an Temple, Yuan dynasty.

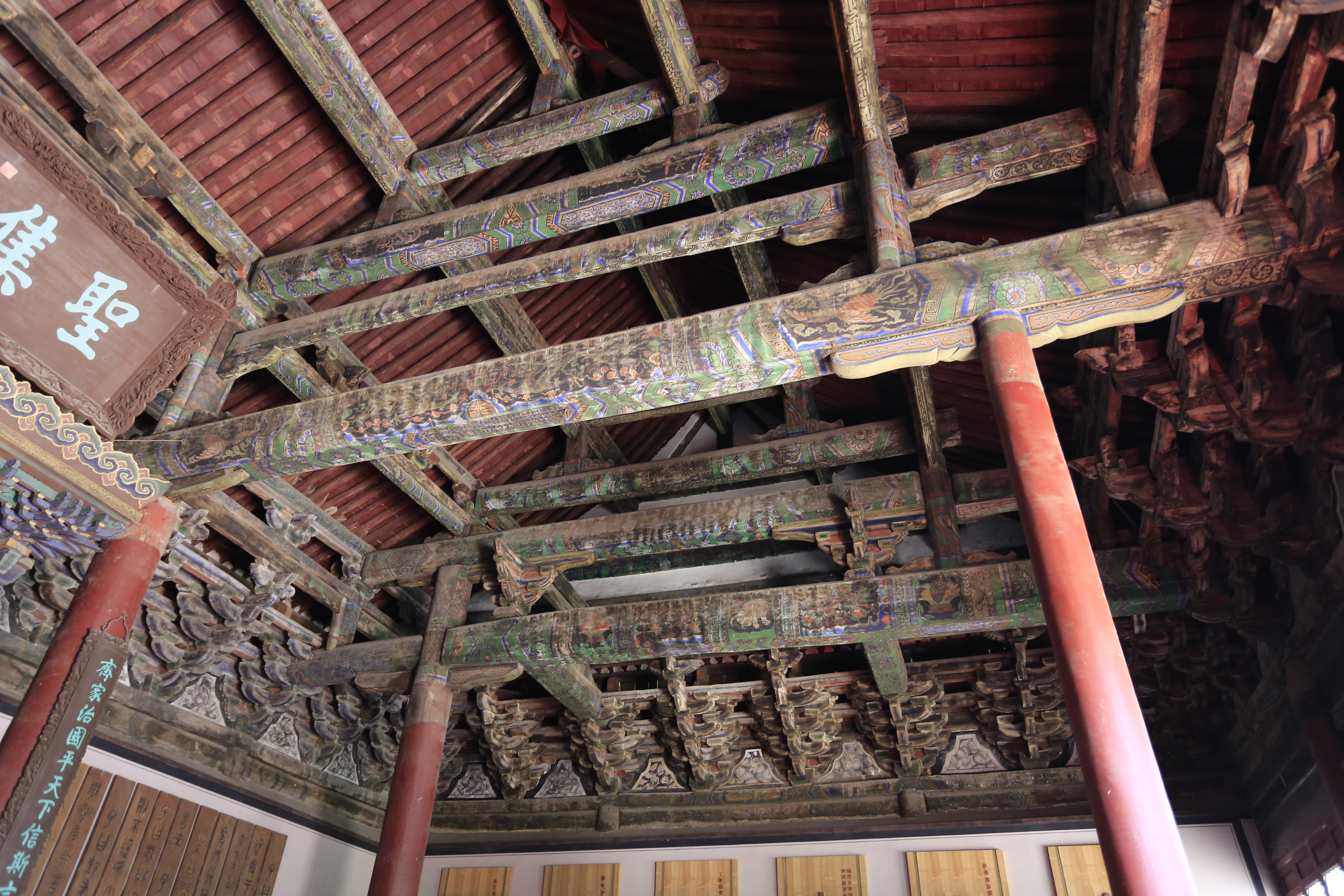
Datong Confucian temple inner hall decorations.

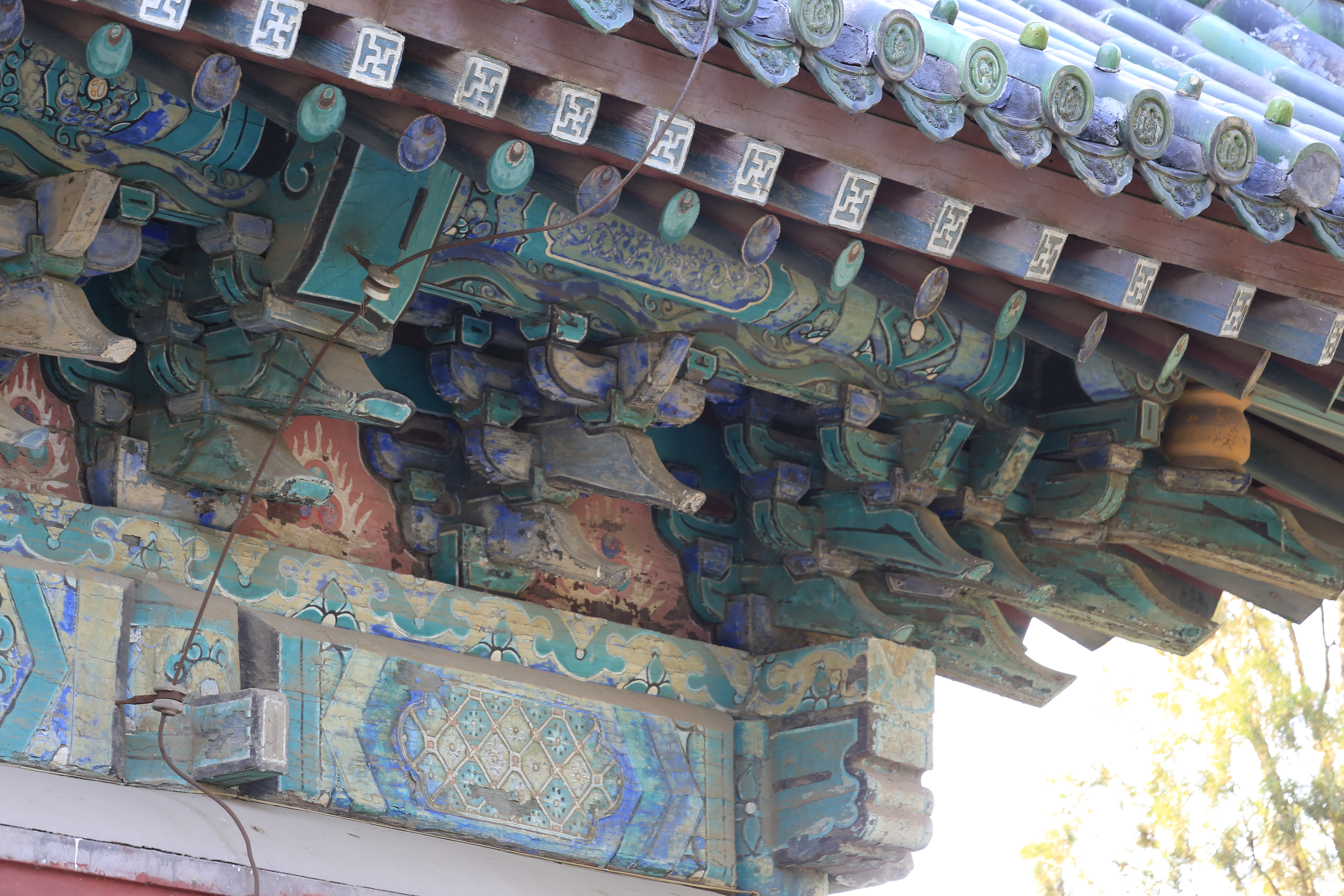
Ming dynasty decorations on Hall of Amitābha at Longxing Temple.

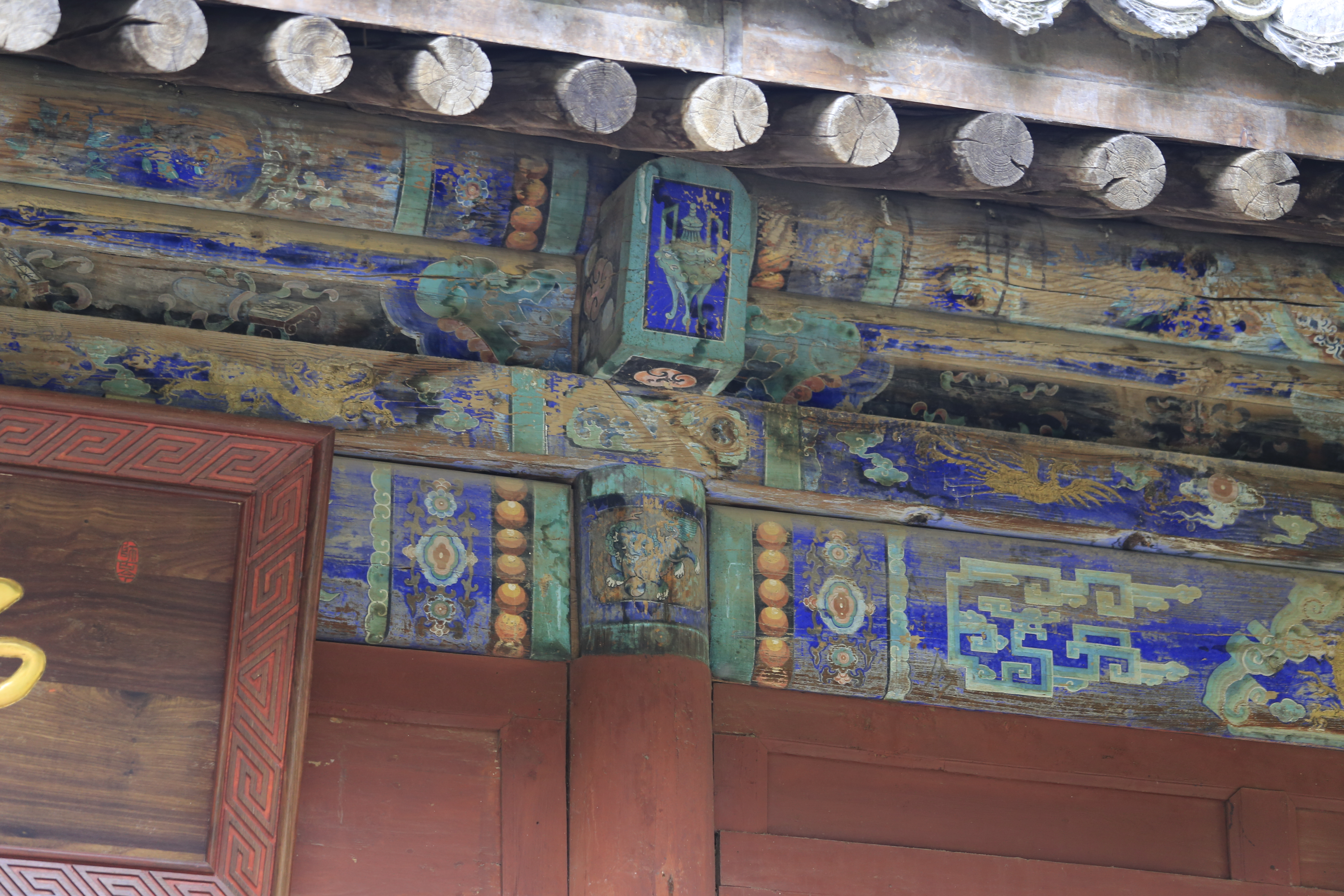
Ming dynasty decorations on Jialan Hall at Foguang Temple.

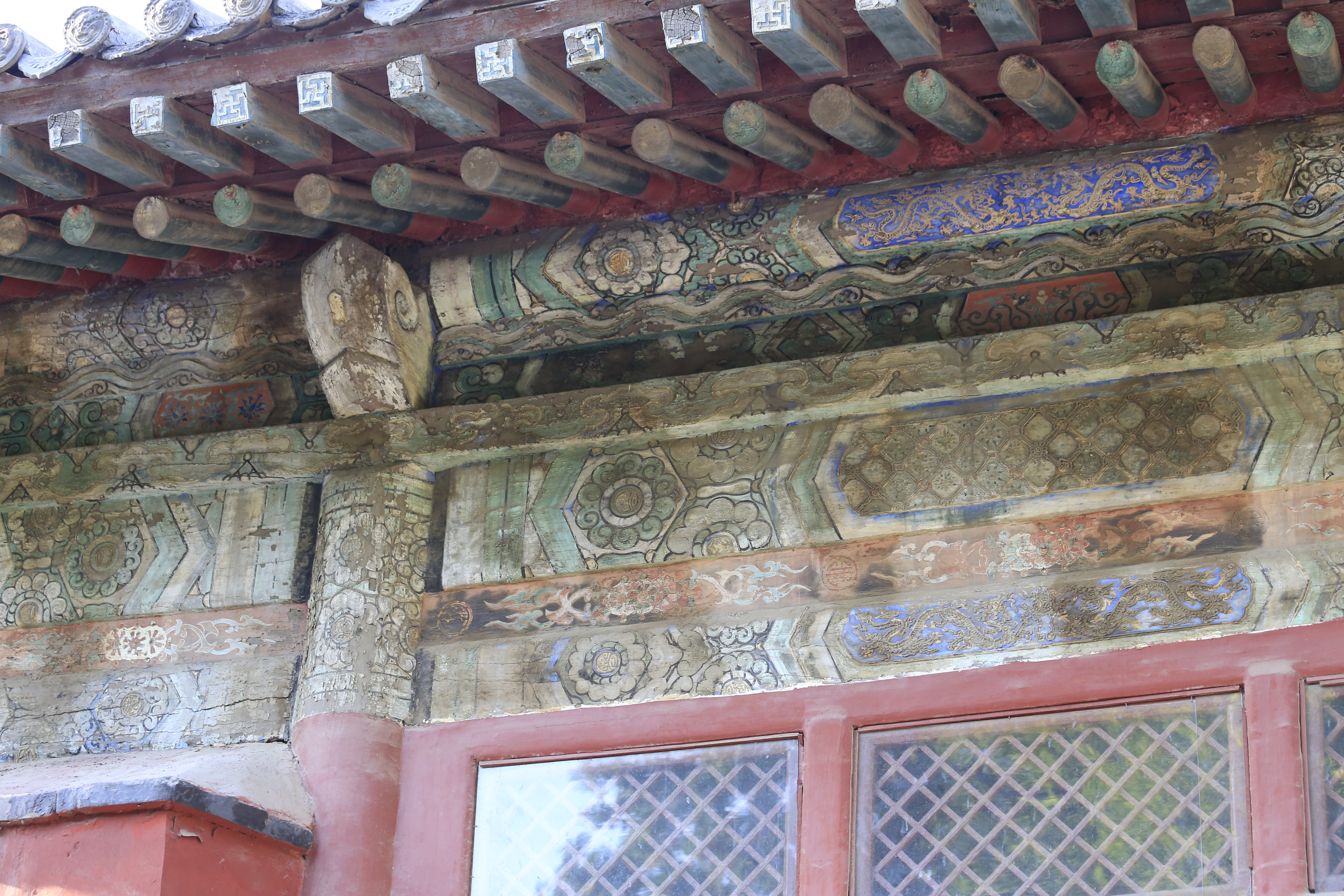
Ming dynasty decorations on Hall of Amitābha at Longxing Temple.

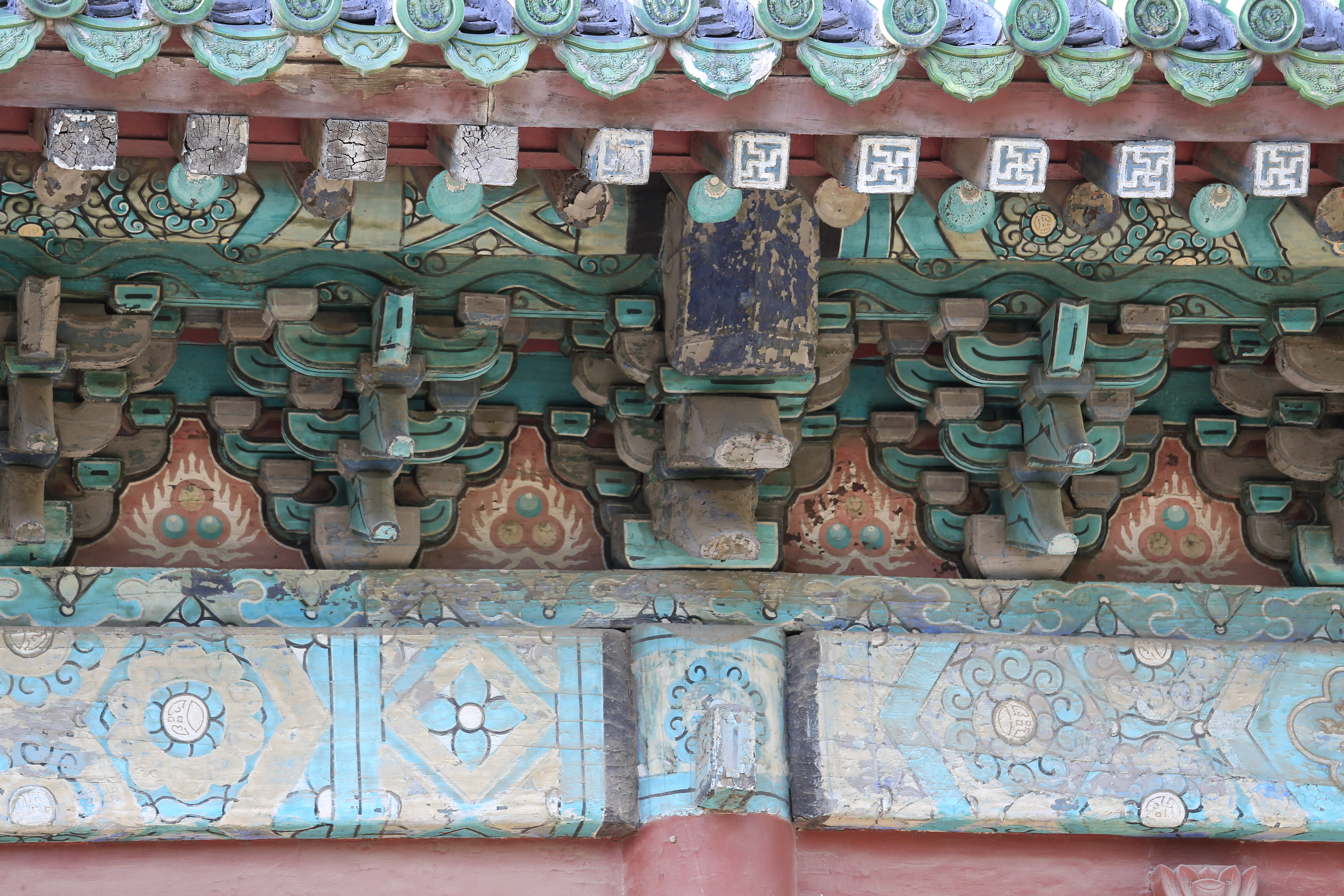
Ming dynasty decorations on Hall of Amitābha at Longxing Temple.

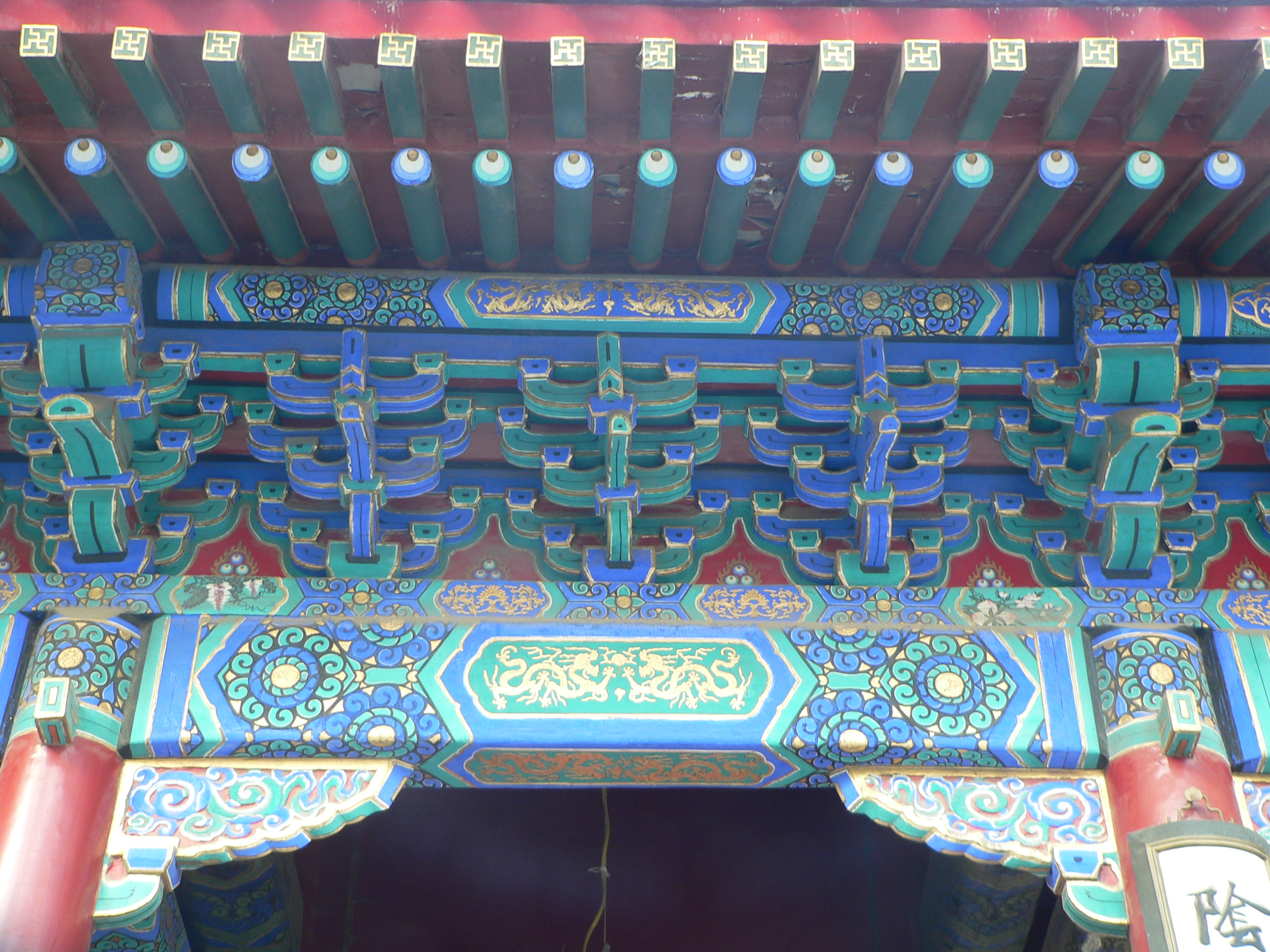
Xuanzi-style decorative design on the Beijing Dongyue Temple

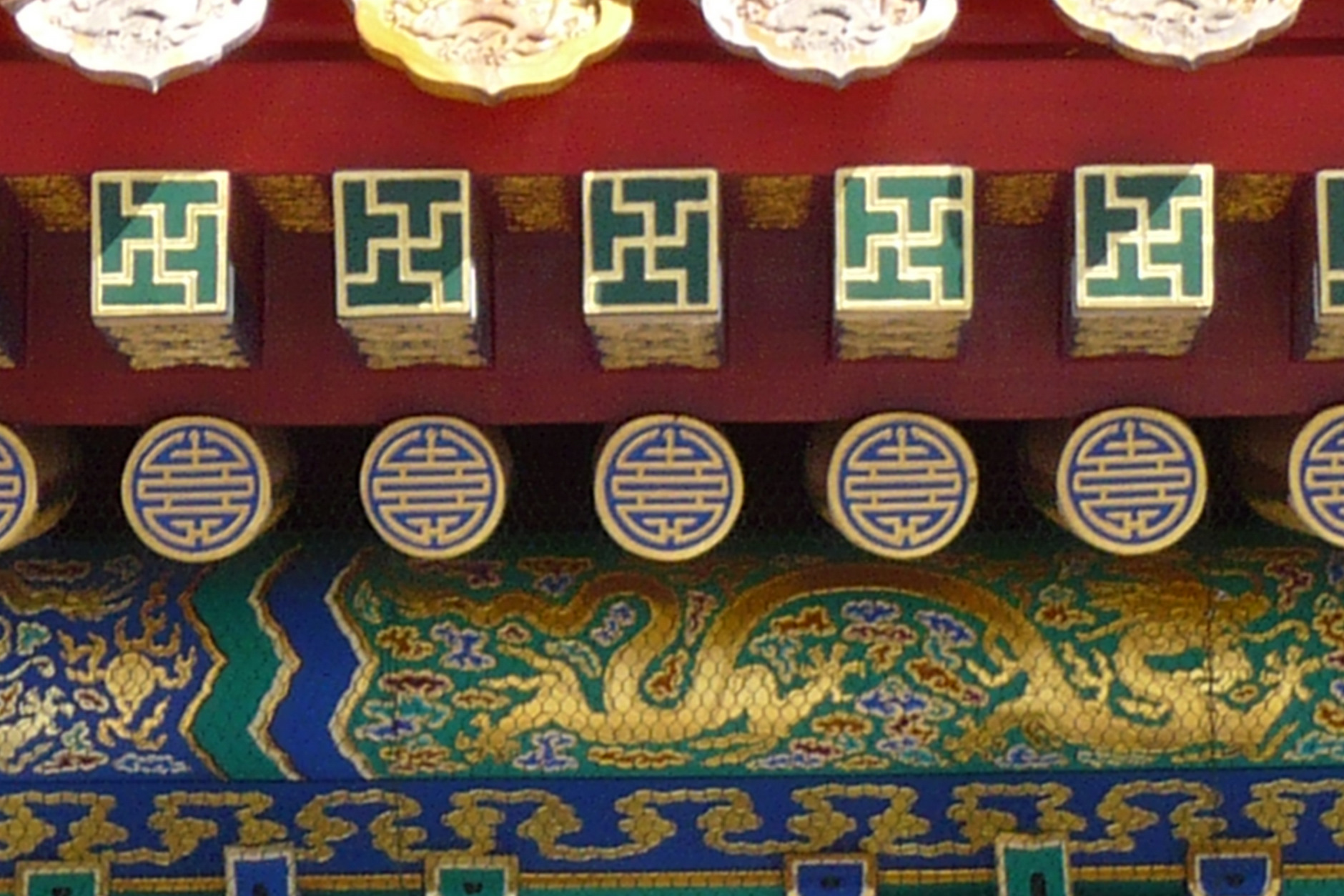
Caihua found on the Gate of Heavenly Purity of the Forbidden City

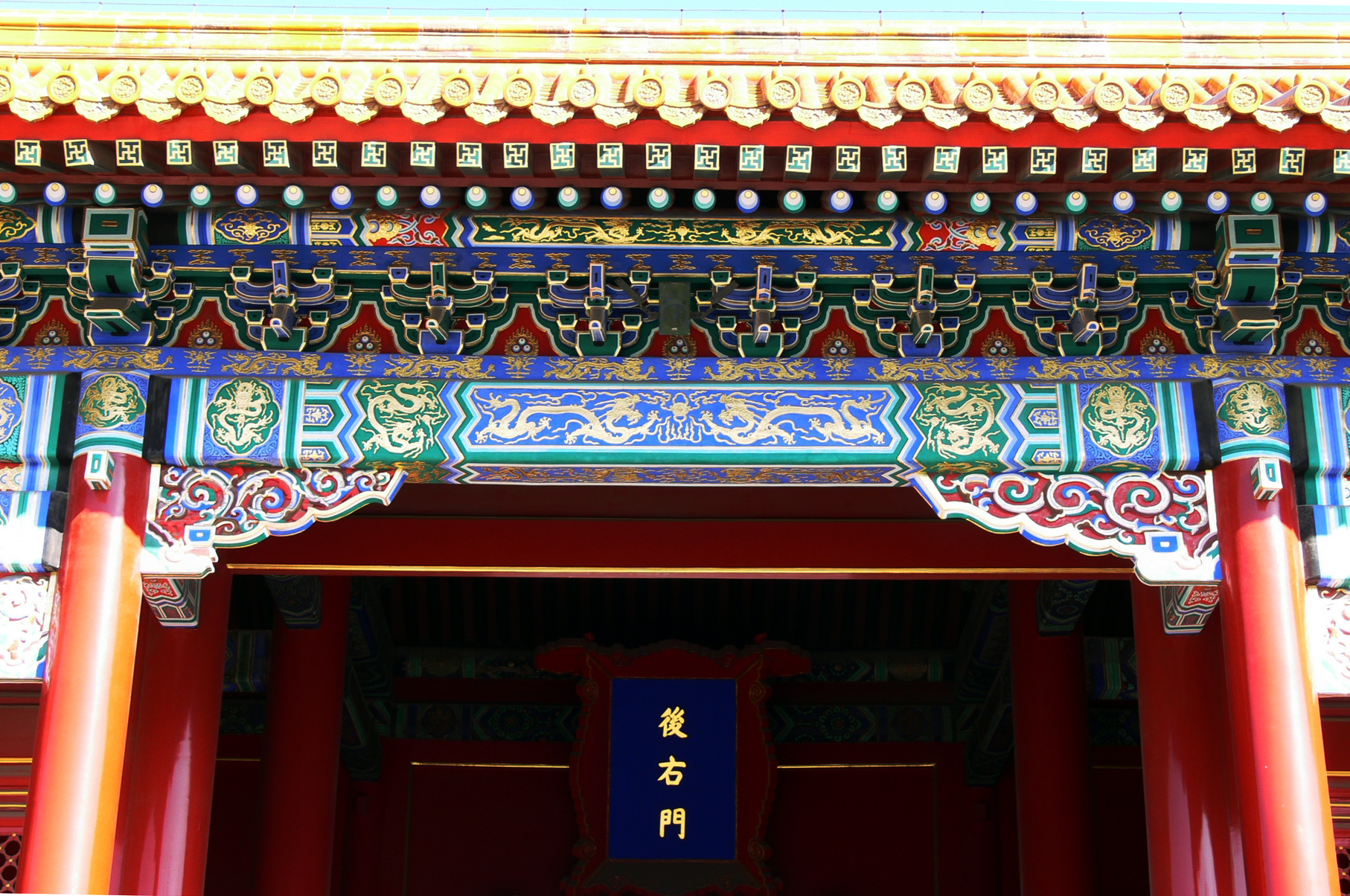
Hexi-style decorative design on the Imperial Palace gate of the Forbidden City

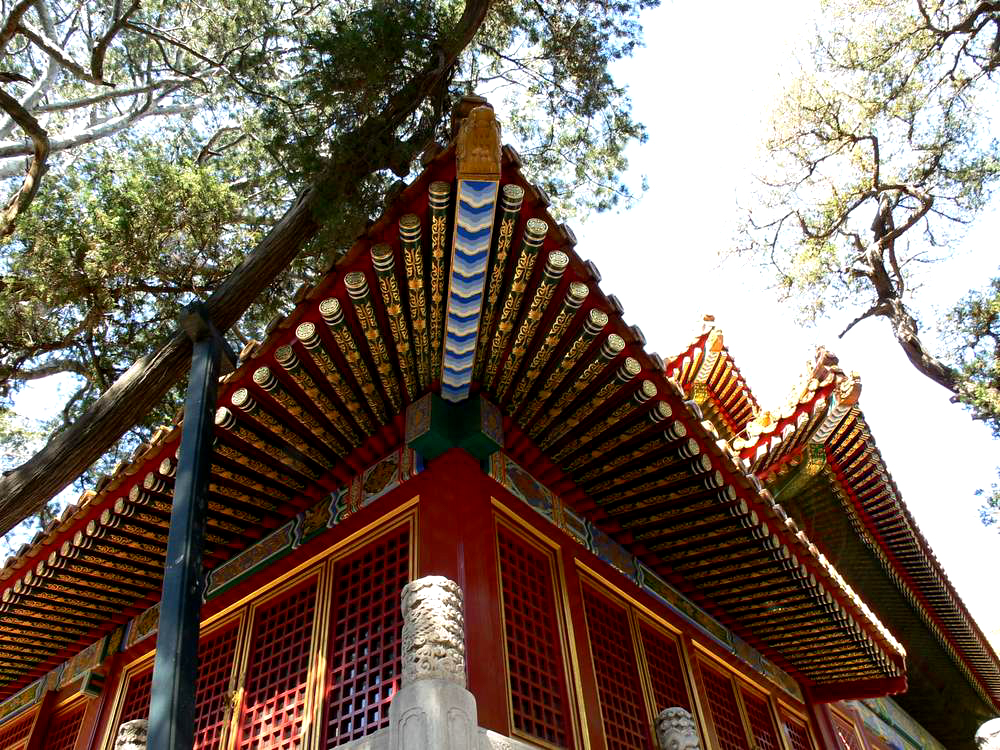
Underside decorations of Qin'an Hall of the Forbidden City

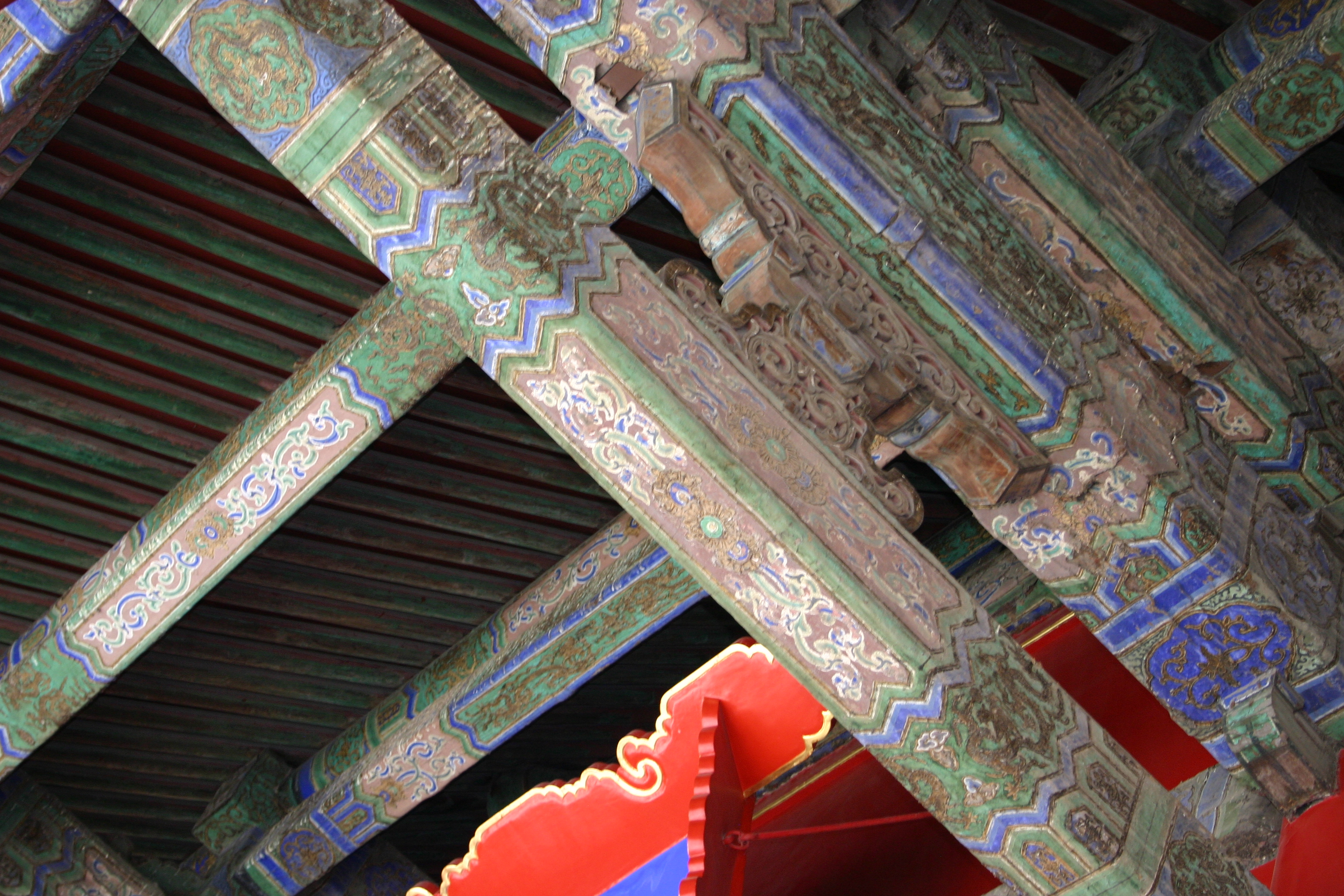
Decorations on support beams inside a palace of the Forbidden City.

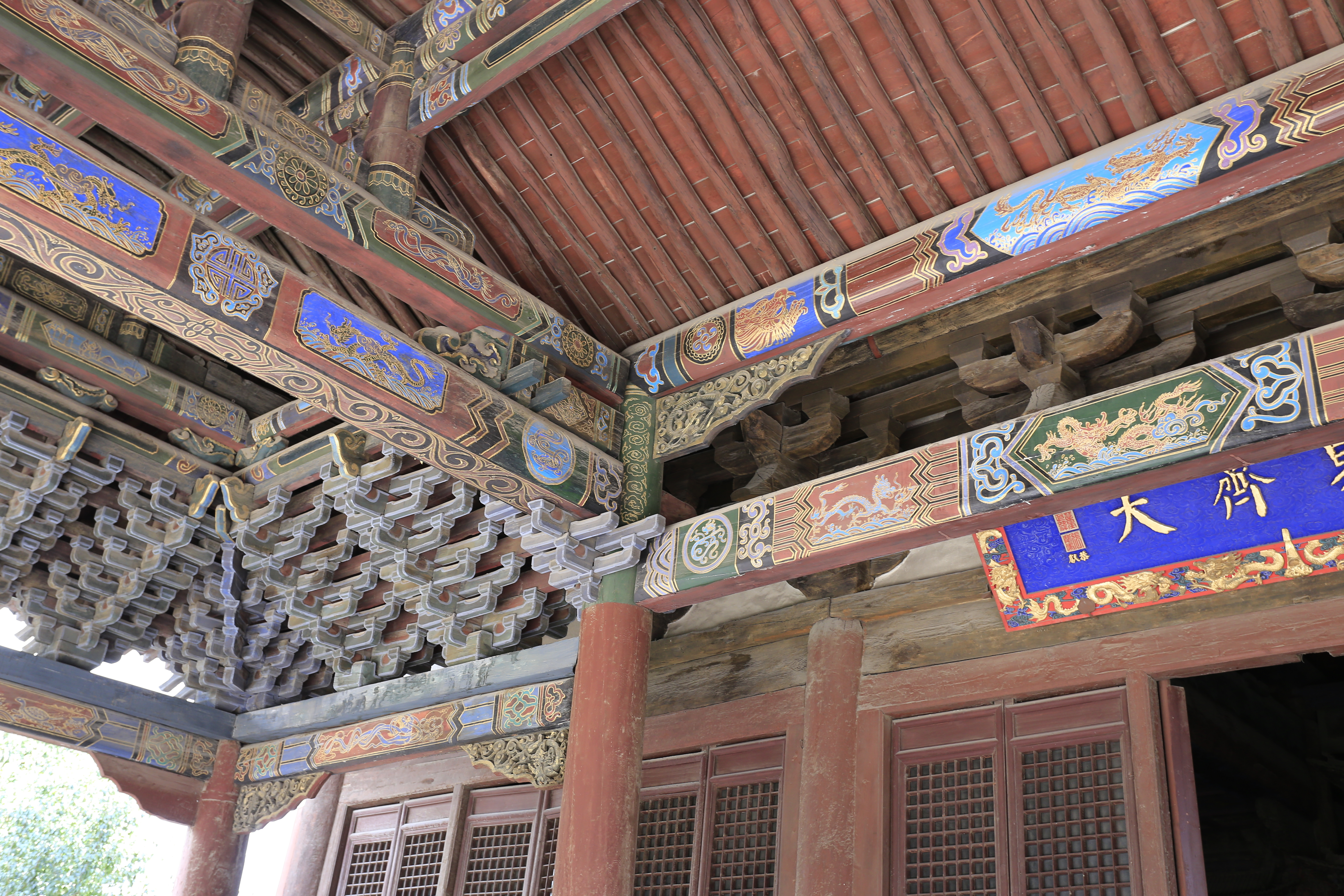
Datong Guandi temple.

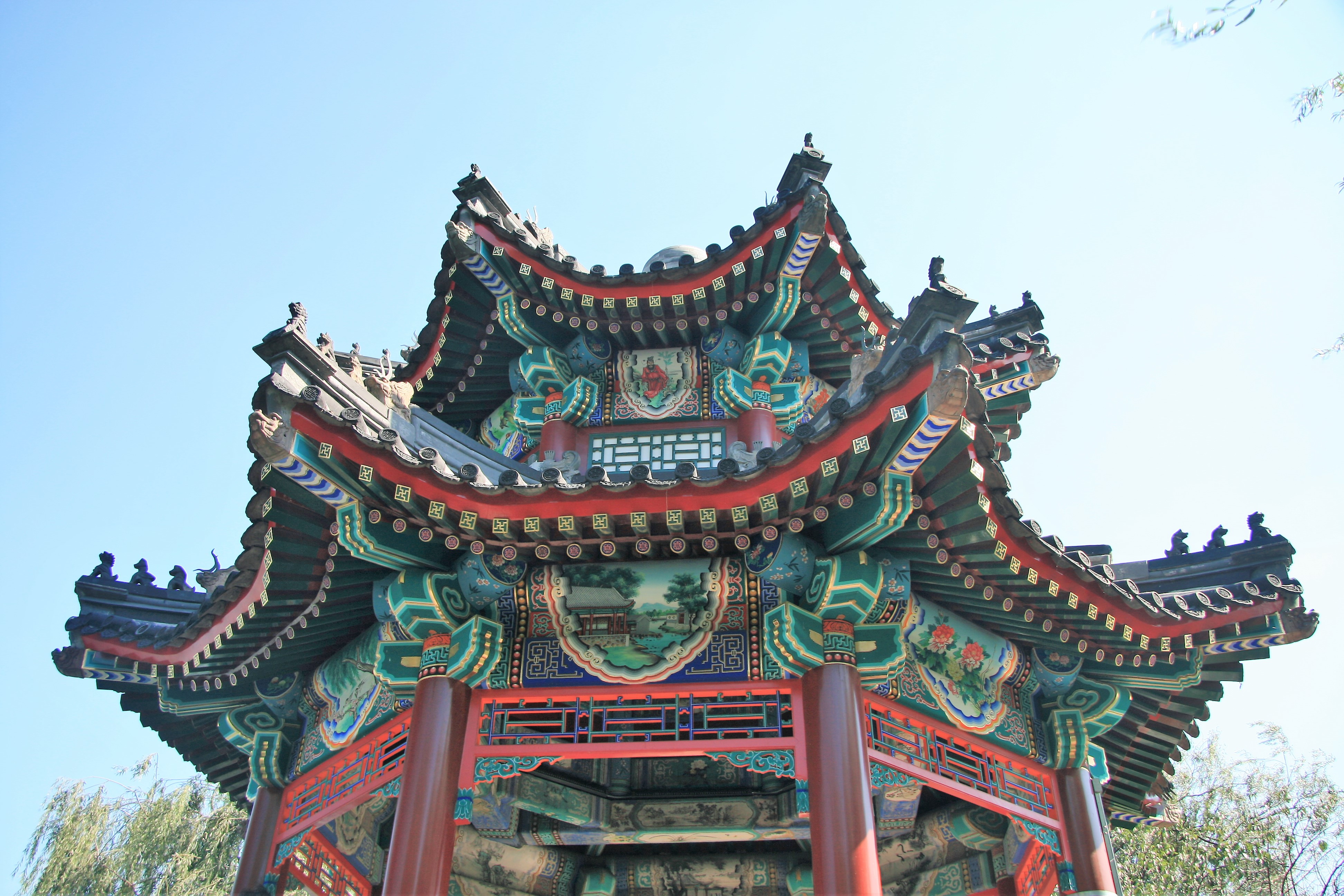
Decorations on Summer Palace pavilion

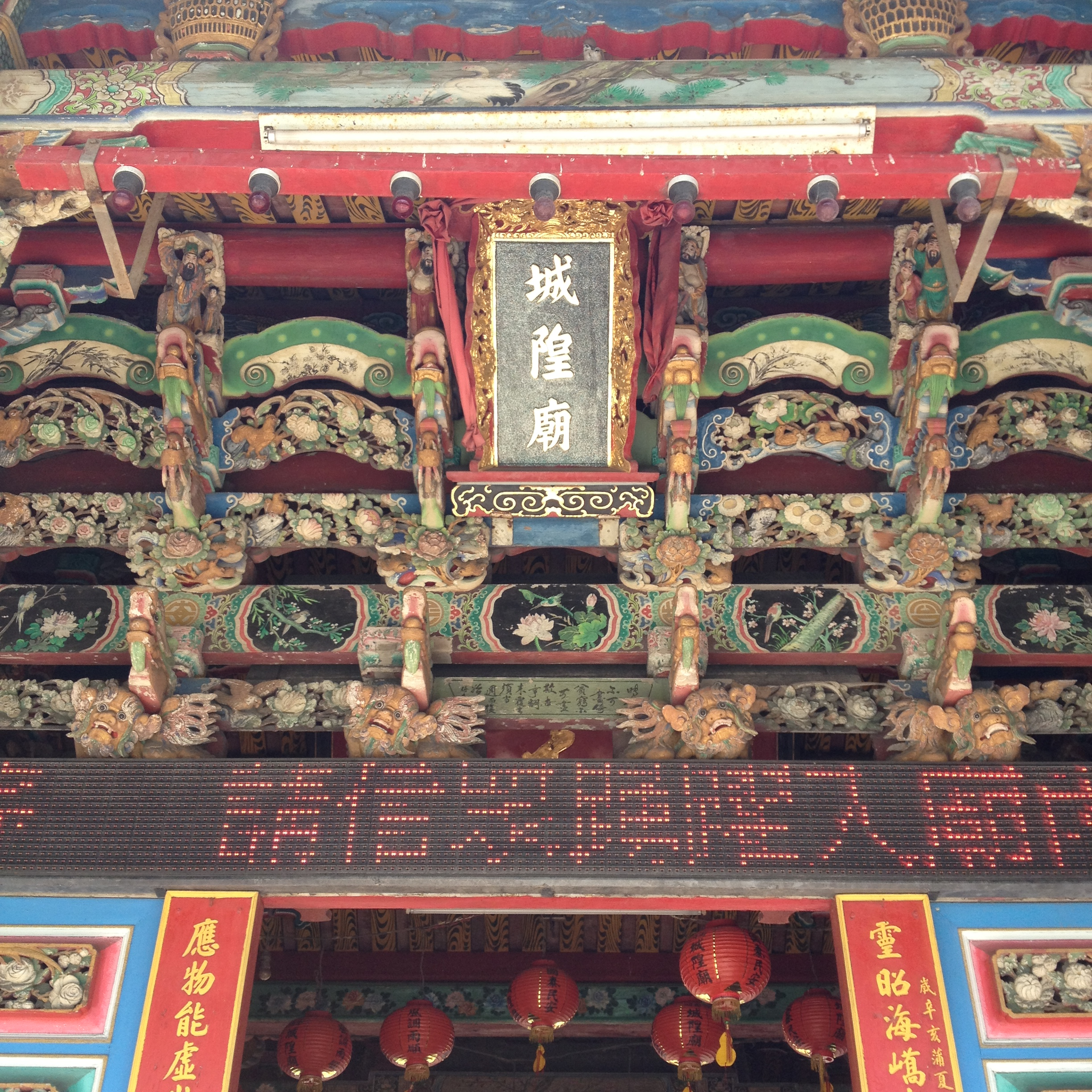
Magong Chenghuang Temple decorations, Taiwan.

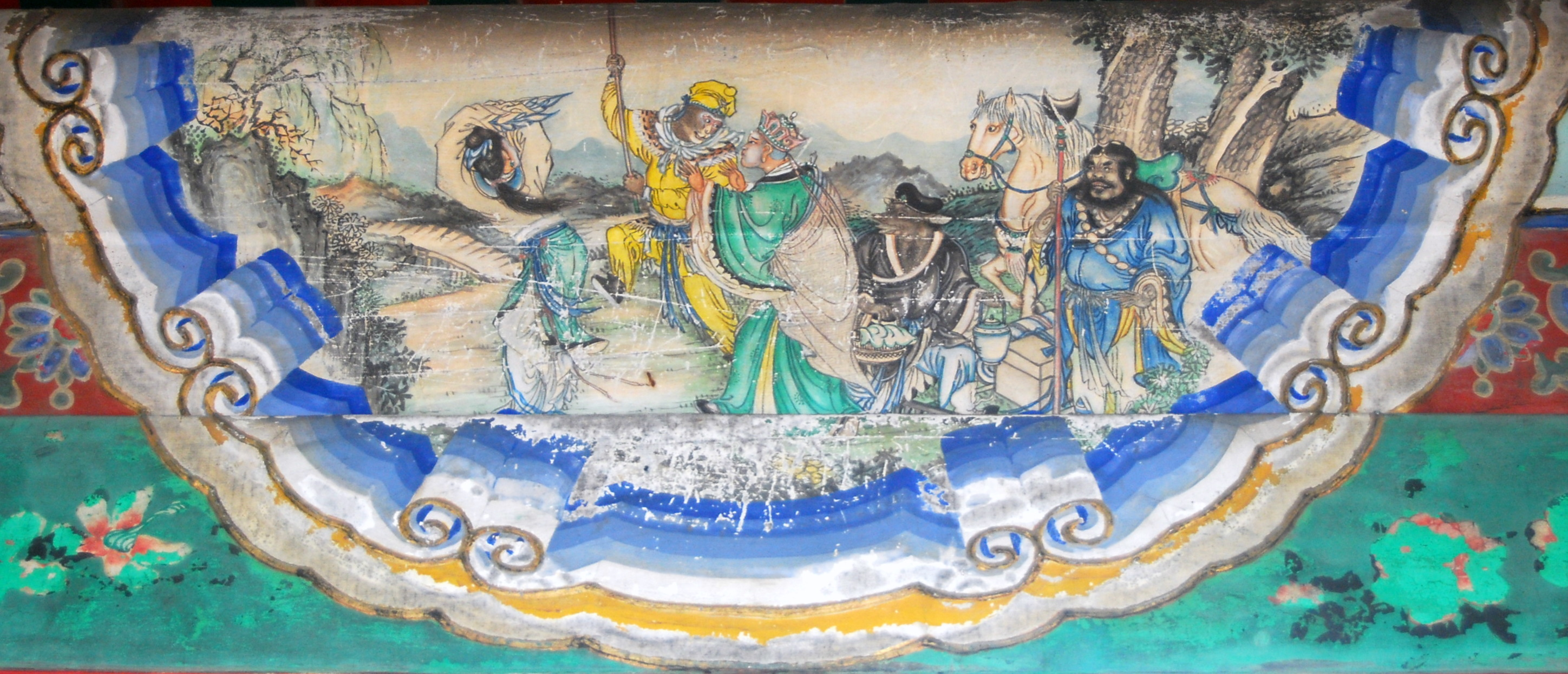
Painted mural depicting an event from Journey to the West on the Long Corridor from Qing Dynasty Summer Palace

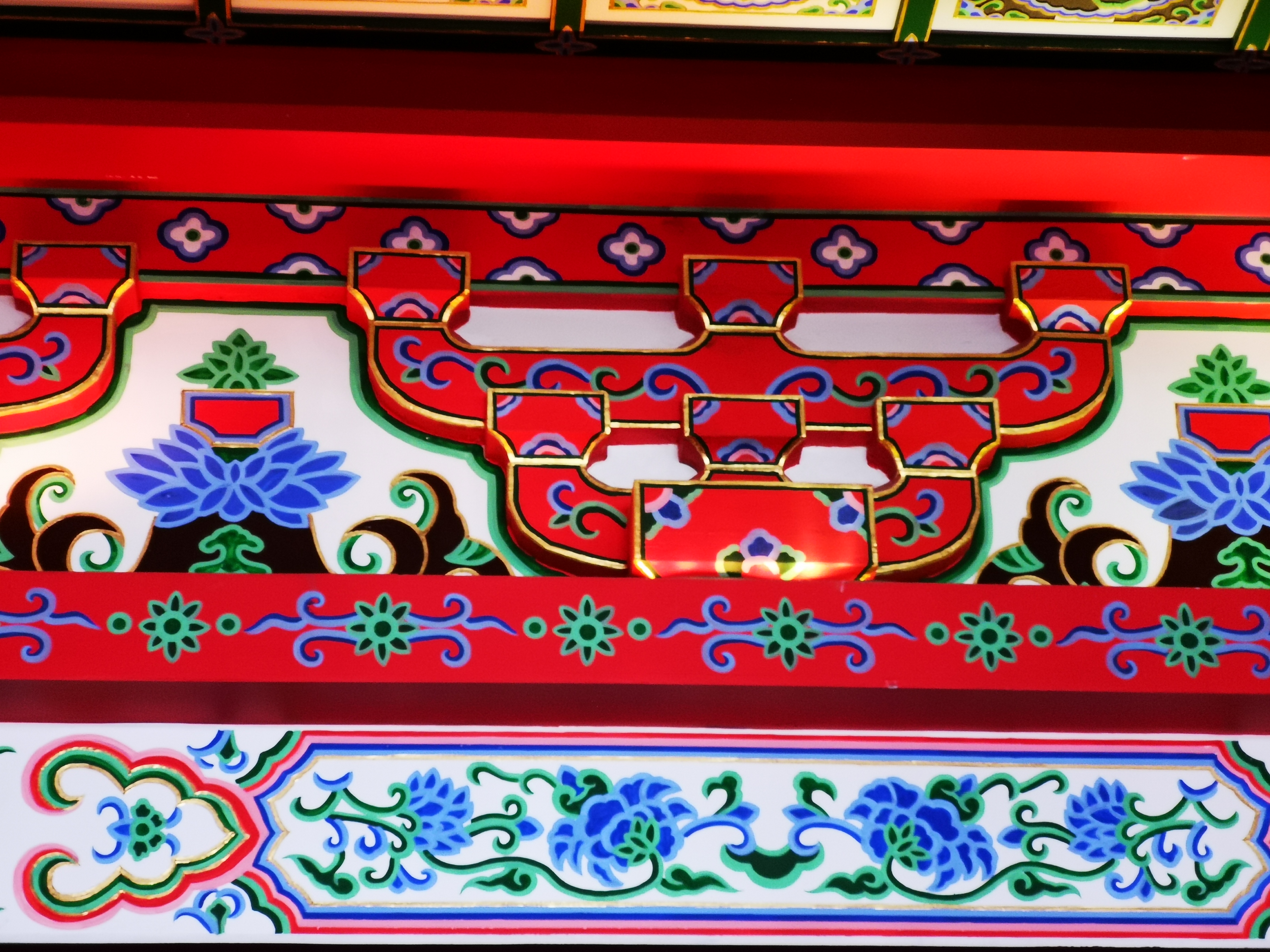
Caihua-decorations of Pavilion of Prince Teng, inspired by Song dynasty Yingzao Fashi decorations.

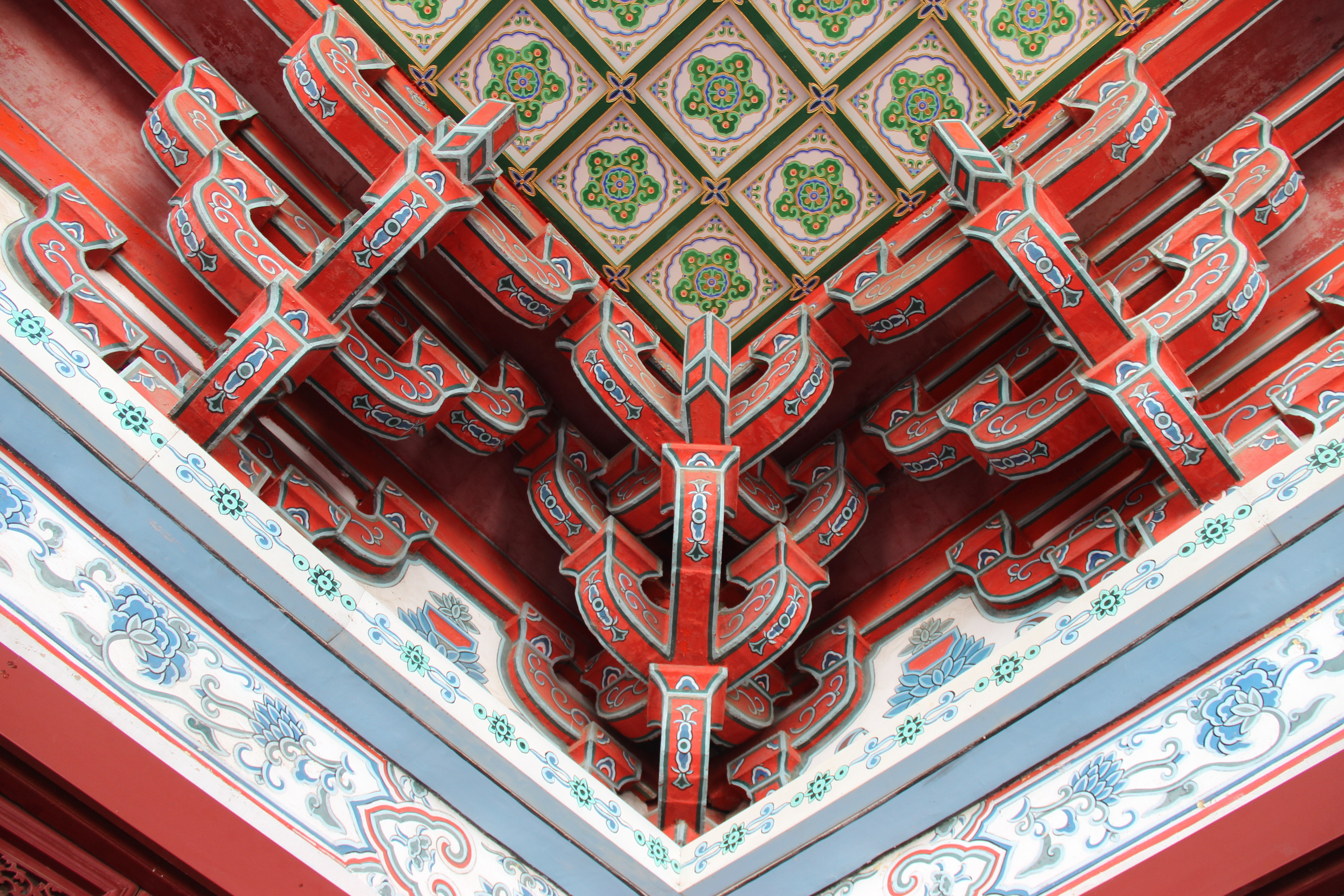
Caihua-decorations of Pavilion of Prince Teng, inspired by Song dynasty Yingzao Fashi decorations.

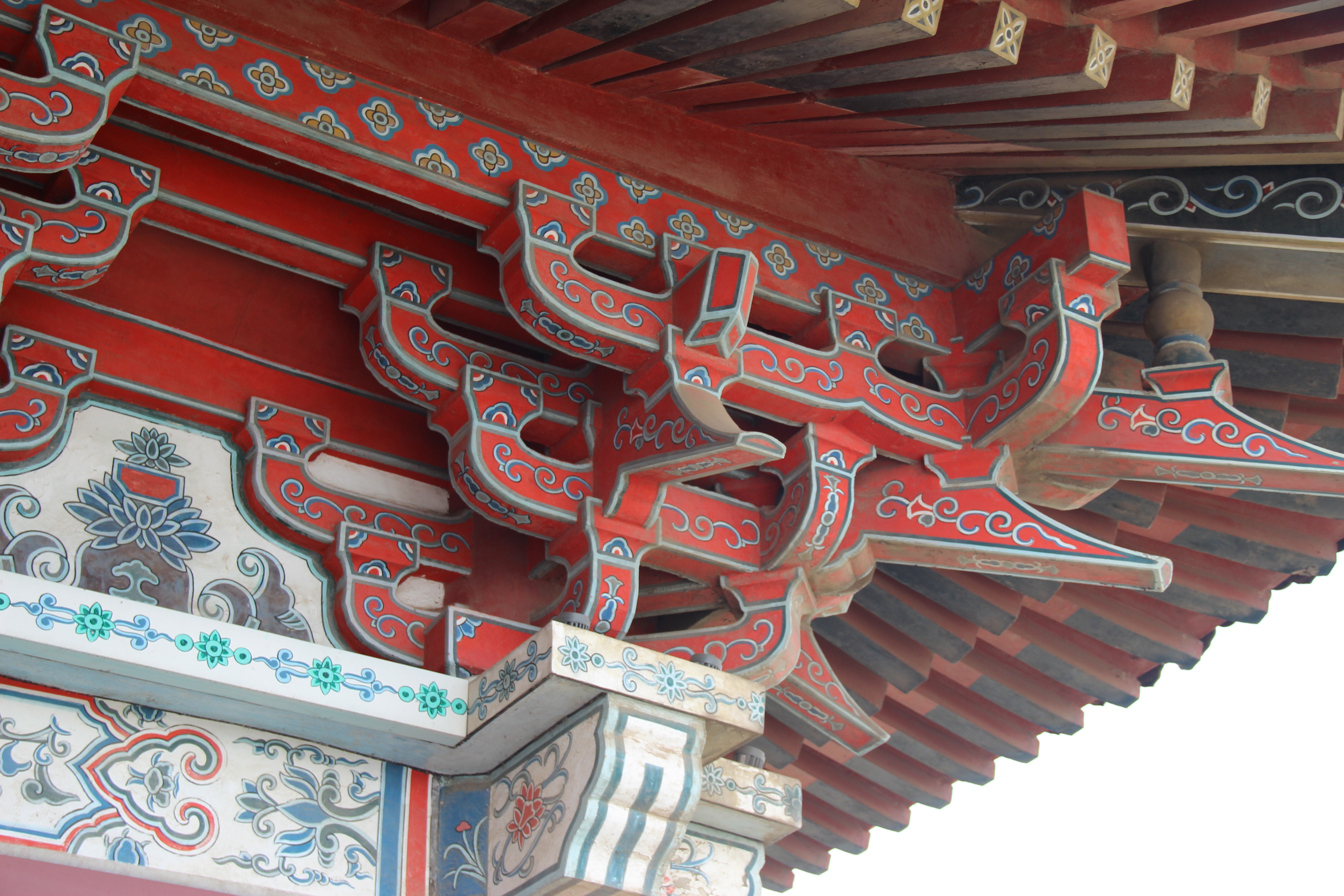
Caihua-decorations of Pavilion of Prince Teng, inspired by Song dynasty Yingzao Fashi decorations.

== See also ==
- Hexi Caihua
- Ancient Chinese wooden architecture
- Chinese architecture
- Yingzao Fashi
- Architecture of the Song Dynasty
- Dancheong
