= Four Treasures of Hebei =

Historic locations in Hebei, China

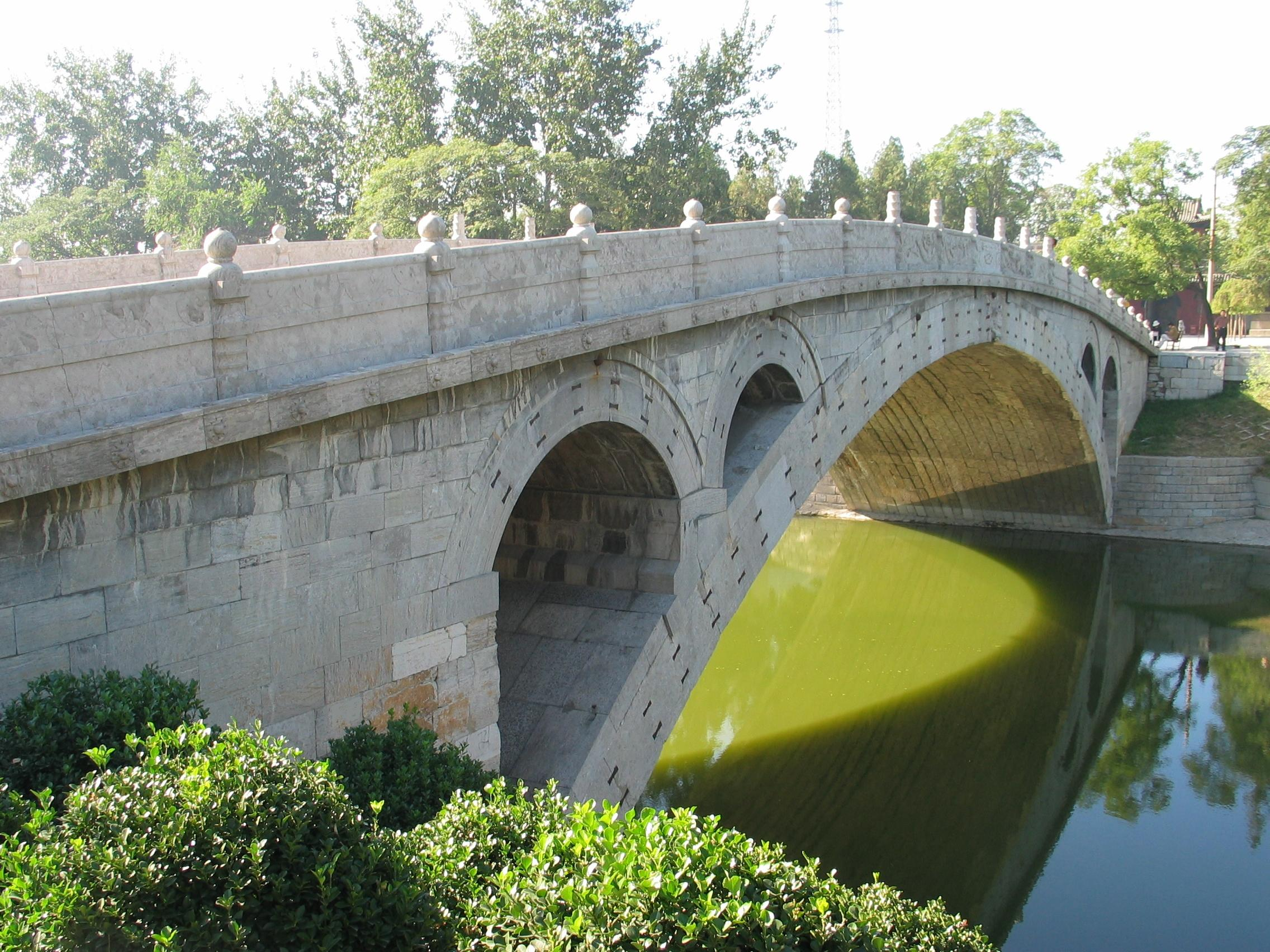
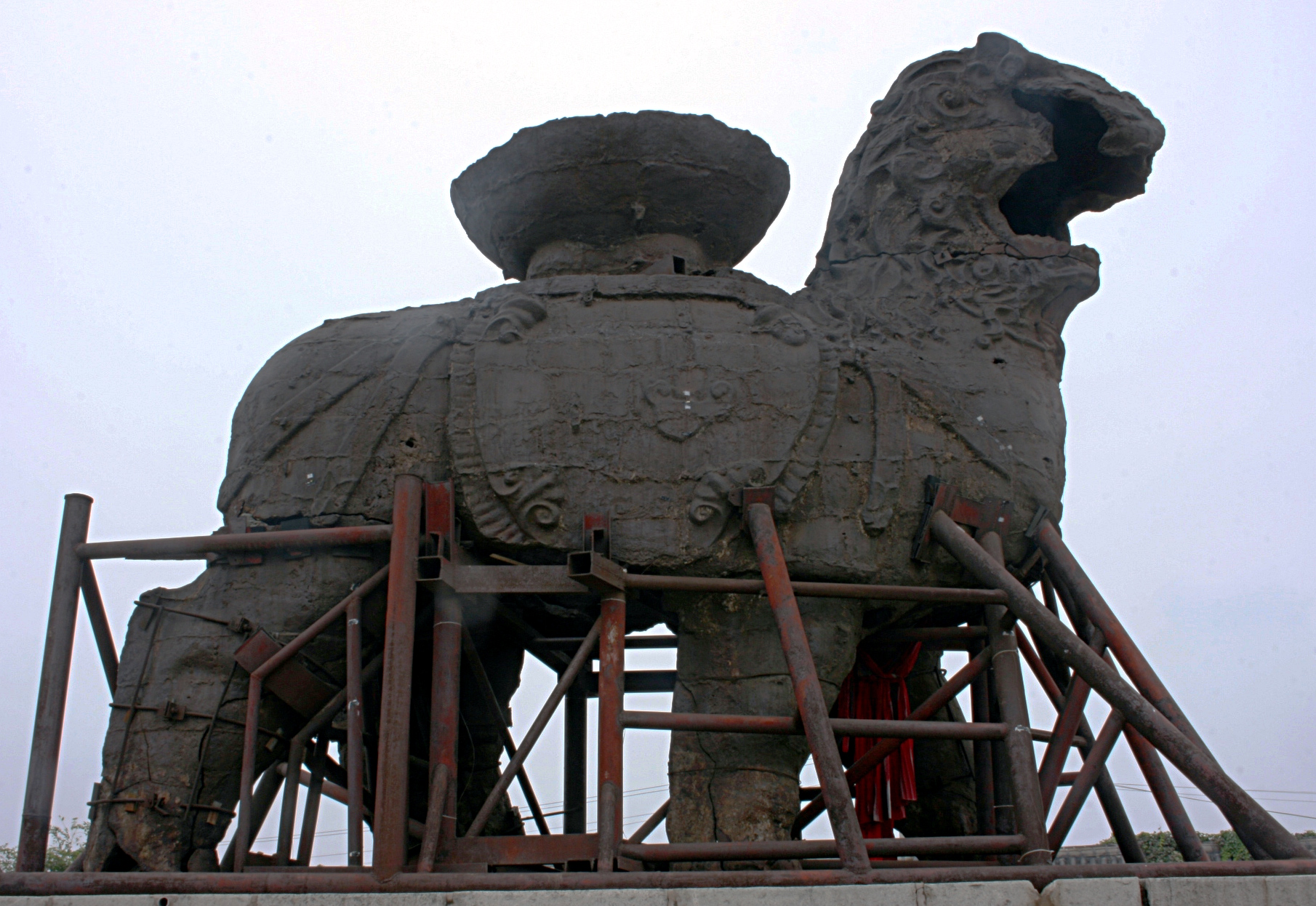
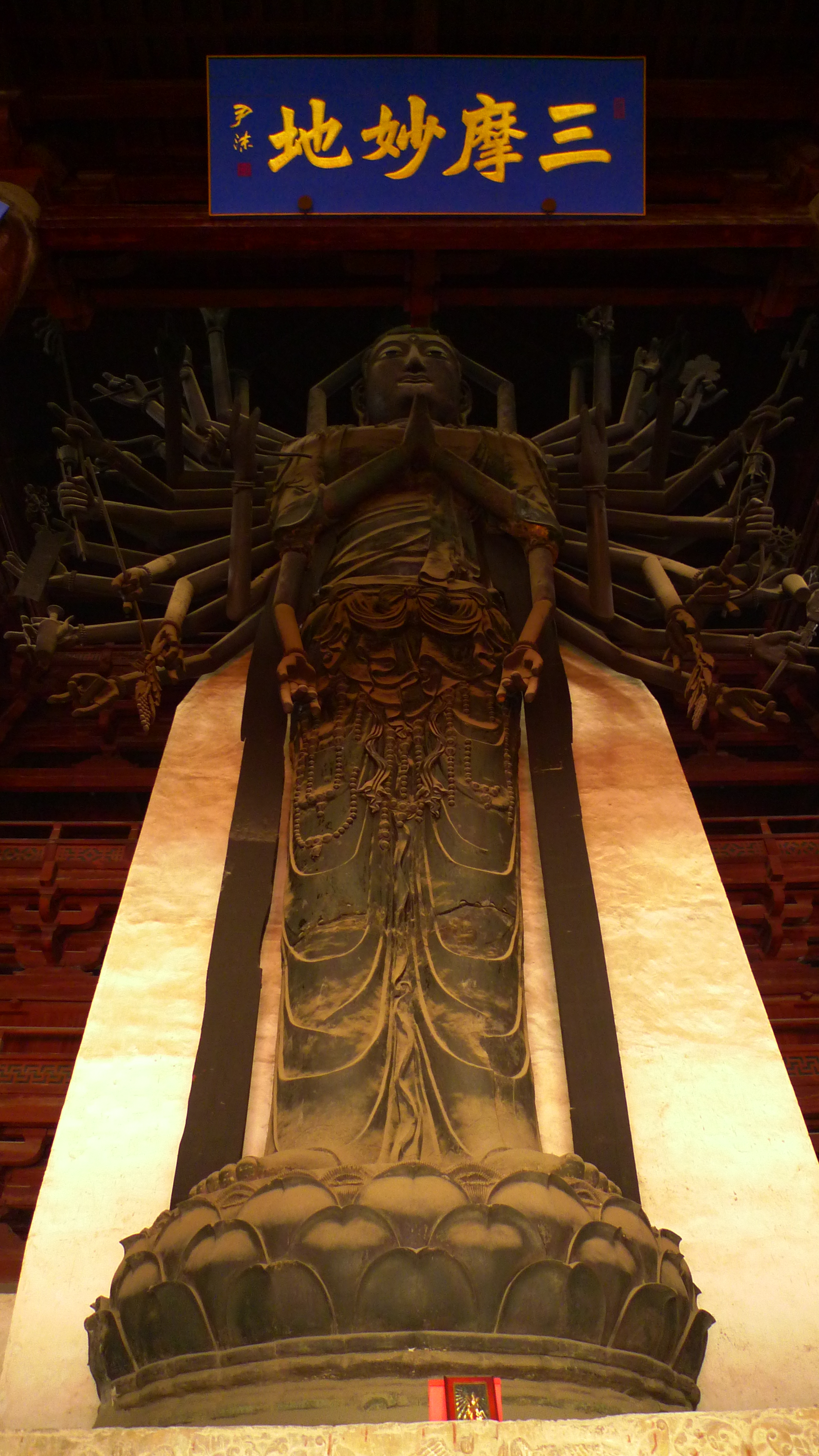
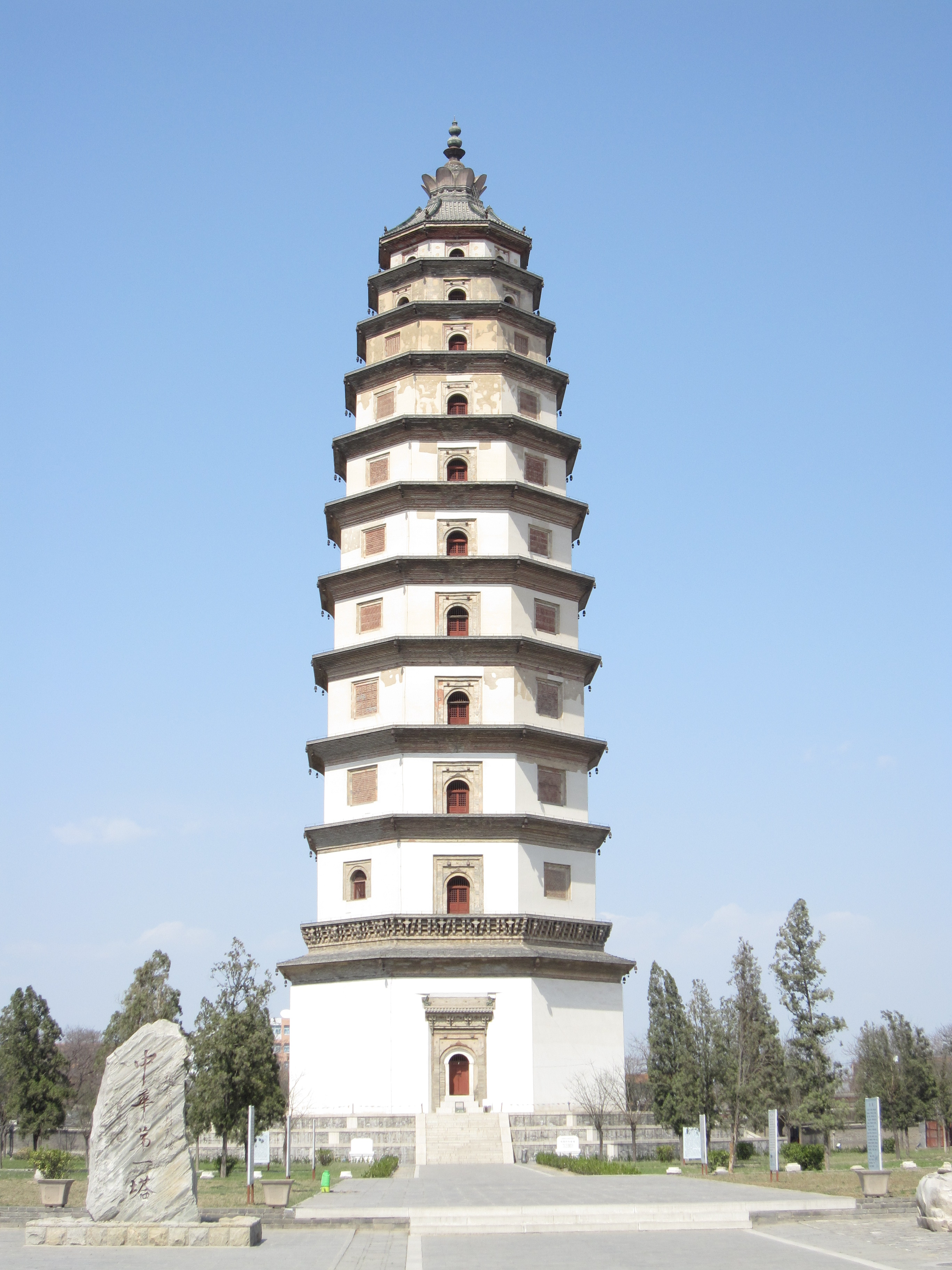
Left to right: the Anji Bridge, Iron Lion of Cangzhou, Great Bodhisattva of Zhengding, and Liaodi Pagoda

The Four Treasures of Hebei (Chinese: 华北四宝, romanized: huabei sibao) are four artifacts of high historical value located in Hebei, China. They include the Great Bodhisattva of Zhengding, the Anji Bridge, the Liaodi Pagoda, and the Iron Lion of Cangzhou.

== Anji Bridge (605) ==
The Anji Bridge, also called the Zhaozhou Bridge, is China's oldest standing bridge and the world's oldest open spandrel bridge of wholly stone construction. It was built under the direction of Li Chun between the years 595-605 AD during the Sui dynasty. Its segmental arch design using stone repudiated conventional wisdom that a semicircular arch was necessary to transfer the weight of a bridge downwards to where the arch tangentially meets the pier. The double pair of openings piercing both ends of the arch spandrel, which as well as accentuating its lithe curvature, lightens the weight of the bridge and facilitates the diversion of flood waters by allowing them to pass through the auxiliary arches rather than pound against the spandrels.

== Iron Lion of Cangzhou (953) ==
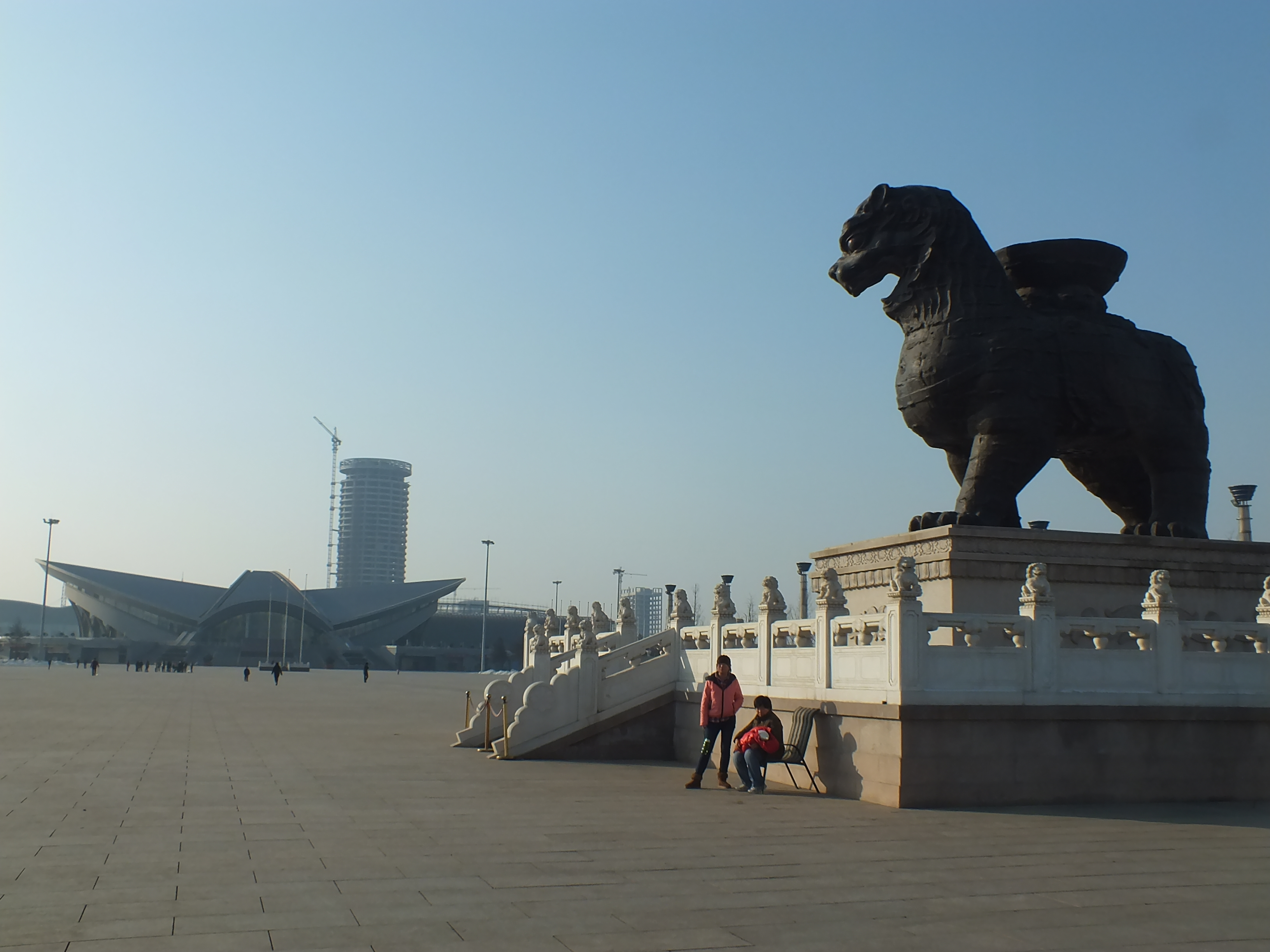
Replica of the Iron Lion of Cangzhou

The Iron Lion of Cangzhou, also known as the "Sea Guard Howler", is a cast iron sculpture located in Cangzhou. Cast in the Later Zhou dynasty in 953, the cast iron lion is the largest and oldest surviving cast-iron artwork in China. Over the years, the sculpture has sustained various kinds of damage. By 1603, its tail had been lost. In 1803, a storm toppled the statue resulting in damage to its snout and belly. In 1886, it was supported with stones and bricks on the orders of a local magistrate. In 1961, it was listed as a national cultural relic. In 1984, the iron lion was remounted on a stone pedestal. Its legs were filled with a sulfate compound. Probably due to these interventions, cracks began to appear in the sculpture. Therefore, most of the compound was removed during restoration work carried out in 2000.

often said to be the largest iron casting on record in the world, the famous Cangzhou Lion in the city of Cangzhou, Hebei, cast in +953. It is 5.4 m high, 5.3 m long, and 3 m broad; its weight is estimated at 50 tons. Art historians believe that the lion was originally inside a Buddhist temple, now long gone, and that a bronze statue of the bodhisattva Manjusri rode in the lotus flower on the lion's back. The bodhisattva was at some time removed for the value of its bronze; this could have happened as early as the reign of Shizong (r.+954-958), Emperor of the minor dynasty of Later Zhou, in his campaign against Buddhism.

— Donald B. Wagner

== Great Bodhisattva of Zhengding (971) ==
The Great Bodhisattva of Zhengding is a 22.8-meter-tall (75 ft) cast bronze statue of Guanyin located in the Longxing Temple, Zhengding. There was originally another statue before this one that was set up in 586 AD, which it replaced. The construction of the new statue began during the Song dynasty in 971 AD. It was cast in seven parts from the bottom up starting with the lotus stand and finishing with the arms, of which there are 42 in total. The back of the statue has since been sawn off and replaced with a wooden frame. The statue weighs 36 tons. Throughout the construction process, some 3,000 artisans were involved.

== Liaodi Pagoda (1055) ==
The Liaodi Pagoda is located in Kaiyuan Monastery, Dingzhou. It is the tallest existing pre-modern Chinese pagoda and tallest brick pagoda in the world. Construction began during the Song dynasty (960–1279) in 1001 and was completed in 1055. The pagoda stands at a height of 84 meters (276 ft), resting on a large platform with an octagonal base. Upon completion in 1055, the Liaodi Pagoda surpassed the height of China's previously tallest pagoda still standing, the central pagoda of the Three Pagodas, which stands at 69.13 m (230 ft). The tallest pagoda in pre-modern Chinese history was a 100-meter (330 ft)-tall wooden pagoda tower in Chang'an built in 611 by Emperor Yang of Sui, but the structure no longer exists.

== Bibliography ==
- Lu, Yongxiang (2015), A History of Chinese Science and Technology 3
- Wagner, Donald B. (2008), Science and Civilization in China Volume 5-11: Ferrous Metallurgy, Cambridge University Press
