= Longxing Temple =

Buddhist monastery in Hebei, China

- 隆兴寺
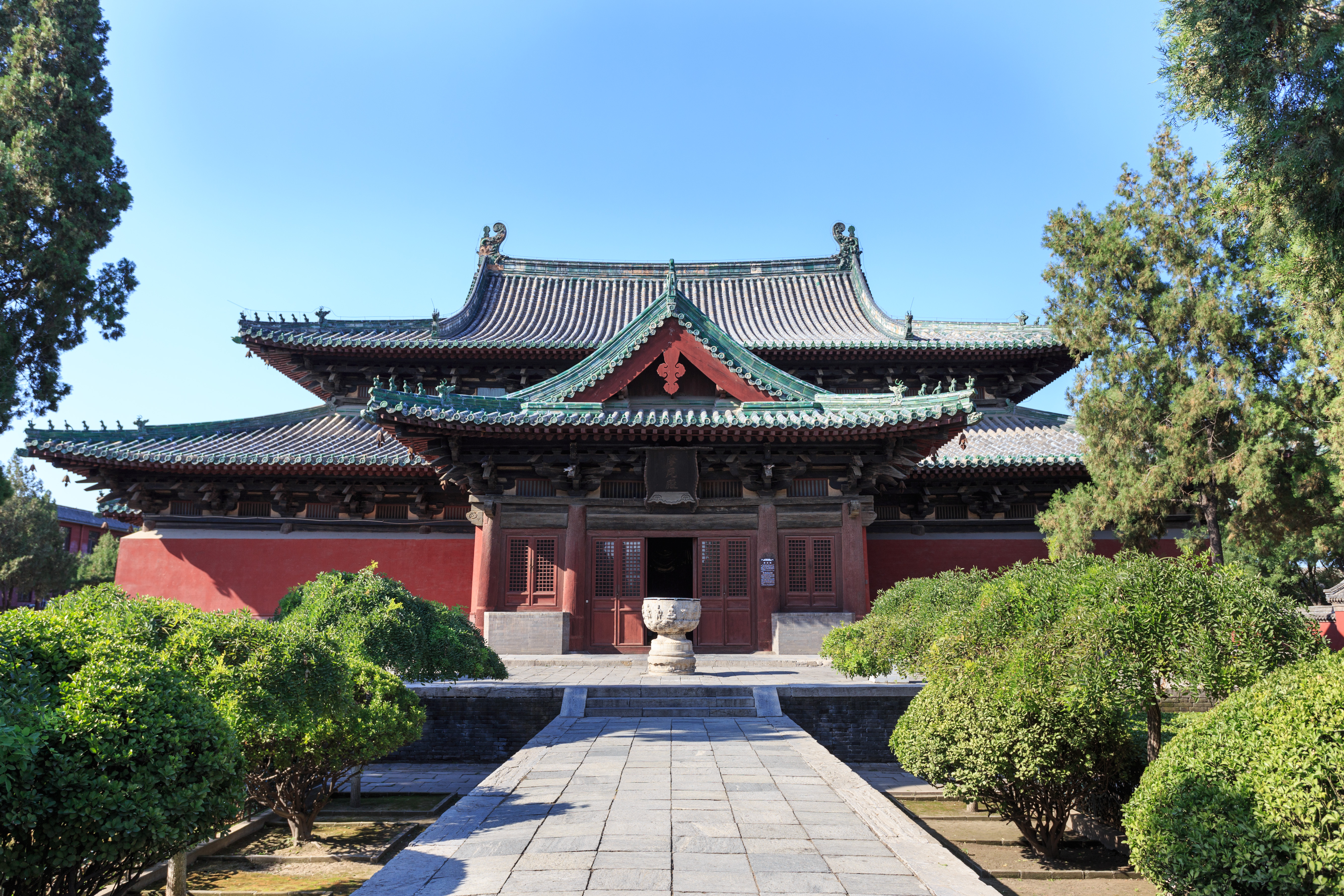
- The Mani Hall of the Longxing Temple

- Location within China

Religion
- Affiliation: Buddhism
- Status: Museum

Location
- Location: Zhengding, Hebei
- Country: China
- Coordinates: 38°8′38.91″N 114°34′33.86″E

Architecture
- Completed: AD1052; Song dynasty

The Longxing Monastery or Longxing Temple (simplified Chinese: 隆兴寺; traditional Chinese: 隆興寺; pinyin: Lóngxīng Sì) is an ancient Buddhist monastery located in the town of Zhengding in Hebei Province, China, approximately 15 kilometres (9.3 mi) north of the provincial capital of Shijiazhuang. It has been referred to as the "Best Temple south of Beijing".

== History ==
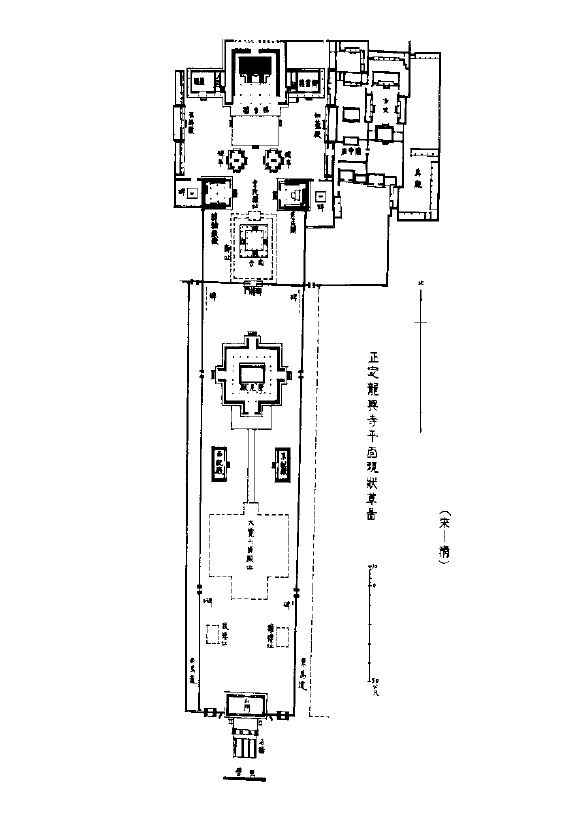
Layout of Longxing Temple, by Liang Sicheng, 1933

The monastery was first built in AD 586, during the Sui dynasty. Its original name was Longcang monastery (simplified Chinese: 龙藏寺; traditional Chinese: 龍藏寺; pinyin: Lóngcáng Sì). One of the oldest stelas on the grounds of the monastery, the "Longcangsi Stele" (simplified Chinese: 龙藏寺碑; traditional Chinese: 龍藏寺碑; pinyin: Lóngcáng Sì Bēi), dates from the year the monastery's foundation. Much of it was reconstructed during the Song dynasty (AD 960–1279). Today, the Longxing Temple is open to the public as a museum.

== Landscape ==
Following a common pattern, the monastery complex features a central axis along which a sequence of buildings and focal points is arranged. The first building is the Tianwang Hall. At the opposite end of the axis is the Dabei Pavilion (Chinese: 大悲閣; pinyin: Dàbēi Gé), a 33 m (108 ft)-high wooden structure, which houses a 21.3 m (70 ft) bronze statue of Guanyin cast during the early years of the Song dynasty. Inside the hall, a staircase leads around the statue which allows it to be seen from top to bottom.

Other notable artworks of the monastery include a colorful wooden carving of Guanyin sitting in a grotto and statues of Buddha sitting on a lotus throne.

A unique piece of 12th-century wood architecture from the Song dynasty in the temple is the Zhuanlunzang Pavilion, which was restored in the 20th century. The pavilion houses a rotating bookshelf which was formerly used to store holy texts and Buddhist sūtras. It is the oldest existent rotating repository of its kind.

== Architecture ==
The main gate to the Longxing temple complex faces south. There is a clear axis from the south to the north and all the buildings in the Longxing Temple are aligned to it.

=== Tianwang Hall ===
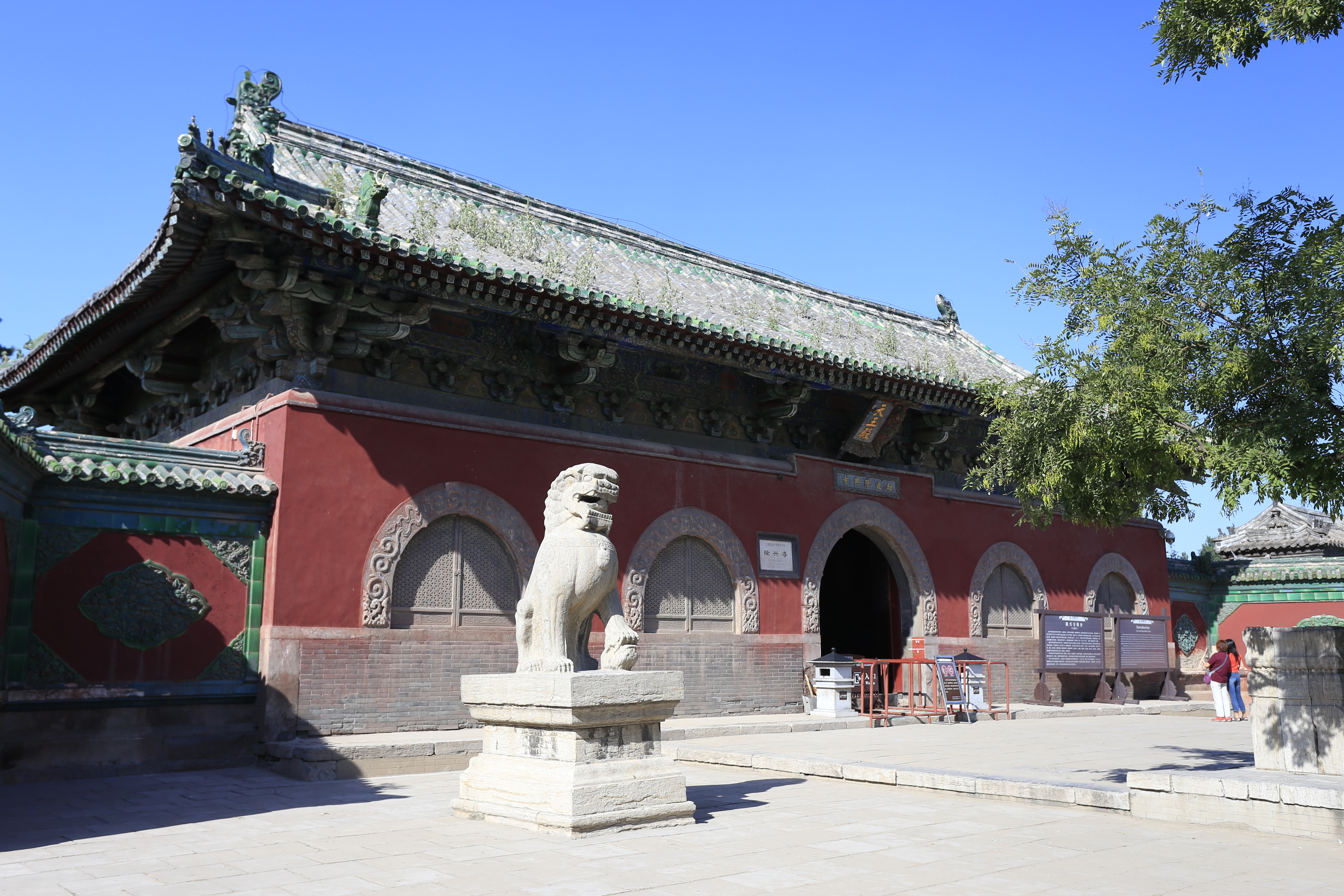
The Tianwang dian (Hall of Four Heavenly Kings)

The Tianwang dian, or Hall of Four Heavenly Kings (Chinese: 天王殿; pinyin: Tiānwáng Diàn) is the first building along the axis of Longxing Temple. It also acts as the main entrance of the whole monastery of Longxing Temple. As is recorded, this hall was built in the early Song dynasty (between AD 982 to AD 988). It was restored several times in history and some of them are recorded, which happened in the 37th year of the Wanli Period, Ming dynasty (AD 1609), 34th year of Kangxi Period, Qing dynasty (AD 1695) and 41st year of Kangxi Period, Qing dynasty (AD 1702). In the 45th year of the Qianlong Period, Qing dynasty (AD 1780), the restoration work tilted the hall to make it face the south as it is today and to be consistent with other major halls. Despite all the restorations in the succeeding dynasties, the main beams and frames of the hall have remained unchanged since the Song dynasty and the overall structural style has been roughly retained.

The Hall of the Four Heavenly Kings is 23.28m in length and 9.62m in width, with doors on both long sides, facing the south and north. The roof is in the East Asian hip-and-gable roof style, which indicates its status as a high-level temple (roof styles are key elements in ancient Chinese to show the political or religious status of a building.). Four statues of the Four Heavenly Kings, each of 4.8m in height, were worshipped on the east and west end of the hall, two on each side. The original statues were demolished in 1966 and what we see today are made in 1982.

In the center of the hall sits a gilded statue of the Monk Budai which was also called the "Laughing Buddha" or "Fat Buddha" by the locals.

=== Dajueliushi Hall (Relics) ===
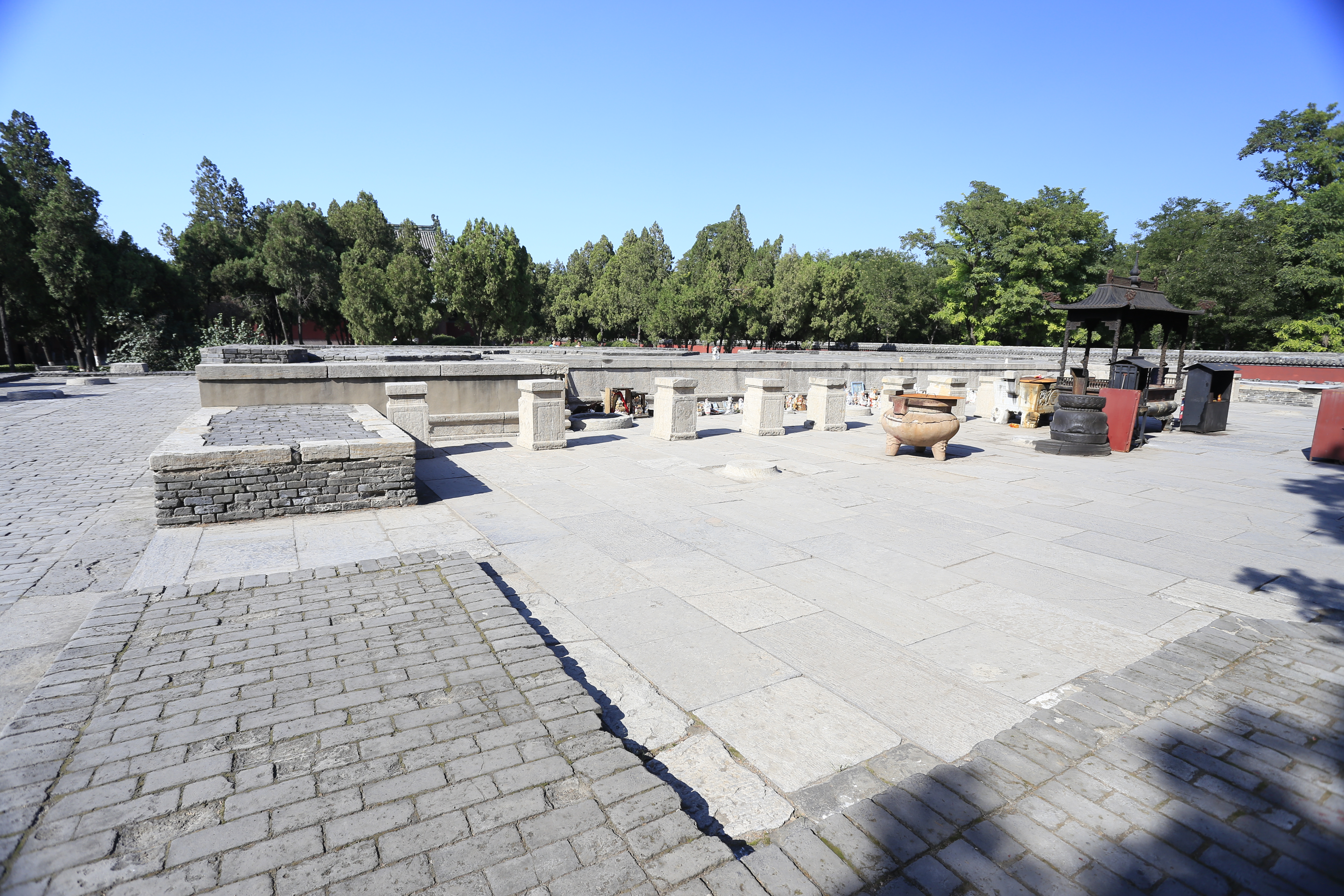
Relics of the Dajueliushi dian (Hall of Dajueliushi), view from the southwest

The Dajueliushi Hall (simplified Chinese: 大觉六师殿; traditional Chinese: 大覺六師殿; pinyin: Dàjué Lìushī Diàn, lit: "Hall of the Six Masters of Great Awakening") is the second hall of the monastery and should have been the main hall (if it didn't collapse), located right to the north of the Hall of Four Heavenly Kings. This hall is dedicated to the six mentors of Shijiamouni, namely Vipassī Buddha, Sikhī Buddha, Vessabhū Buddha, Kakusandha Buddha, Koṇāgamana Buddha and Kasyapa Matanga. In Chinese, the "liushi" (六师) part in its name means "Six Mentors" or "Six Masters". There was a statue of Shijiamouni himself accompanied by six statues of the six mentors in the hall and over a hundred small statues of the Arhats and Bodhisattvas. So the locals also refer to this hall as "the hall of the seven buddhas".

The hall was built in the Yuanfeng Period in the Song dynasty (AD 1078–1085) with the hip roof style, which is the highest level of roof styles in ancient China. In the following centuries, it was restored several times. In the early years of the Republic of China, it collapsed due to poor maintenance and war. Now only the stone platform exists, on which the wooden structure stood in history.

The hall is nine Jian (simplified Chinese: 间; traditional Chinese: 間, the space between two columns on the façade) by six Jians (53.35m by 35.2m), covering 1,878 square metres (20,210 sq ft), which is slightly larger than the largest existing Buddhist hall in China, the Main Hall of Fengguo Temple. Nine was the largest number allowed for the Jians of Buddhist halls in the hierarchy system in ancient China. The Dajueliushi Hall, if still existing, should be the largest and highest-level Buddhist hall all over China.

=== Mani Hall ===
The Mani Hall (Chinese: 摩尼殿; pinyin: Móní Diàn) is the third hall along the axis of Longxing Temple and is regarded as the most important one of all the halls in Longxing Temple. The hall was constructed in the 4th year of the Huangyou Period of the Song dynasty (AD 1052). It was one of the most intact building from the Song dynasty in China. and was restored several times in history, among which the restoration in 1977–1980 was the most thorough one.

The hall was built on a 1.2-metre (3 ft 11 in) high brick and stone platform. The dimension is seven Jians by seven (33.29m by 27.12m), covering over 1,400 square metres (15,000 sq ft). The East Asian hip-and-gable roof style was used here with two levels of eaves. The floor plan appeared to be almost a regular square but was added with one Baosha (simplified Chinese: 抱厦; traditional Chinese: 抱廈, a smaller and loer structure protruding from the main building) on each of the four sides. This combination of square layout, Baosha, and the roof style gave the building a unique exterior appearance, complicated and magnificent. Liang Sicheng, the respected Chinese architect, commented with a surprise when he first saw this hall in 1933: "Except for the corner towers of the Forbidden City, such layout can only be found in the paintings of the Song dynasty. The picturesque elegancy, the solemn and vigorous ancient style gave me an indescribable feeling. In particular, from the perspective of its form, the Mani Hall is overlaying and magnificent, which is indeed one of the finest pieces of architecture art. It broadens our horizon of ancient Chinese architecture."

The structural system of Mani Hall was derived from Yingzao Fashi. The Dougongs drew particular attention from researchers with there large quantity and various styles. The complicated roof was supported by 127 Dougongs, which can be categorized into over 20 styles. For example, the Dougongs supporting the lower eaves are 1.2m in height, equivalent to 1/3 of the column height. Such dimensions Dougongs are typical Song style and can not be found in the Ming or Qing style buildings.

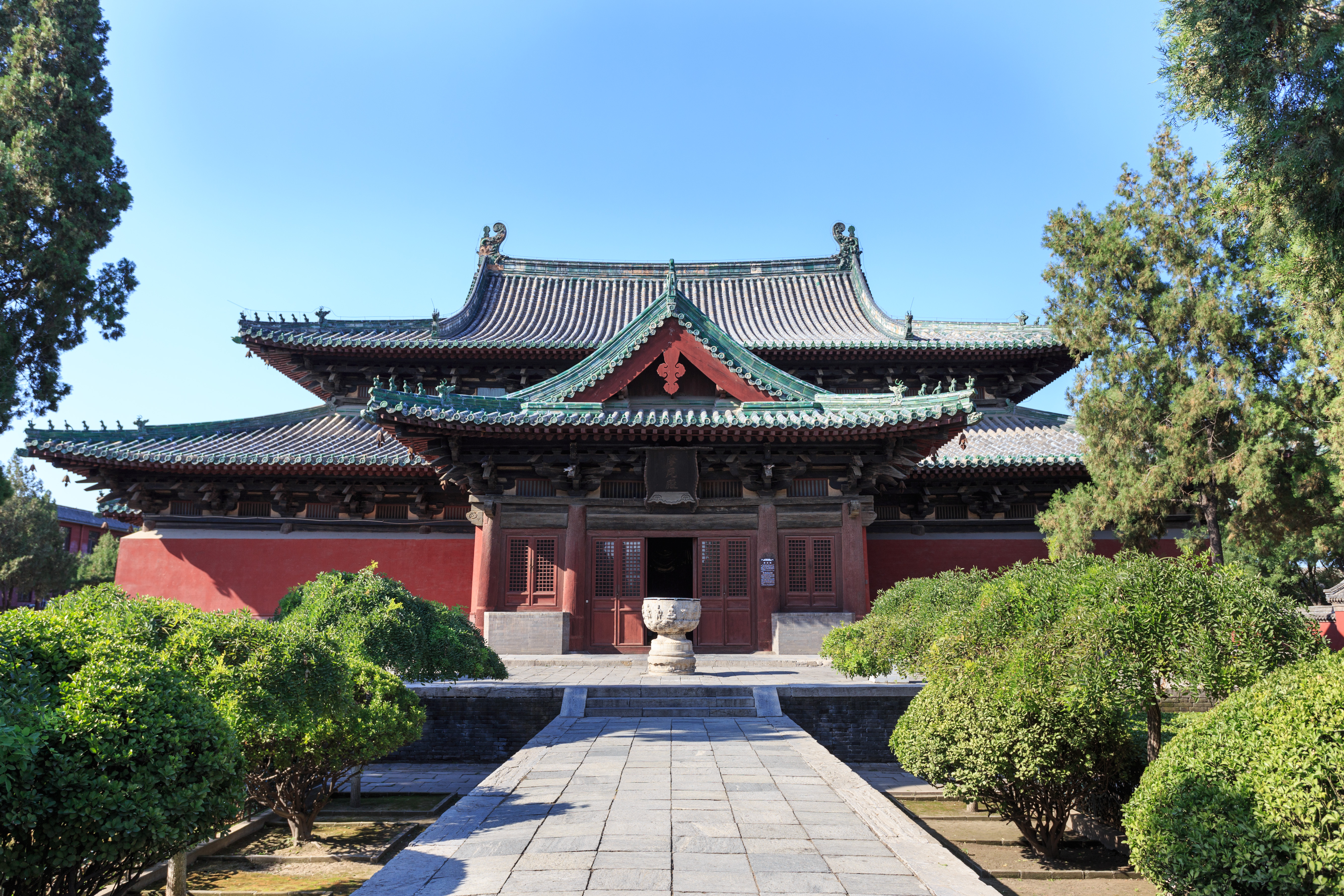
The Moni dian (Mani Hall), view from the south

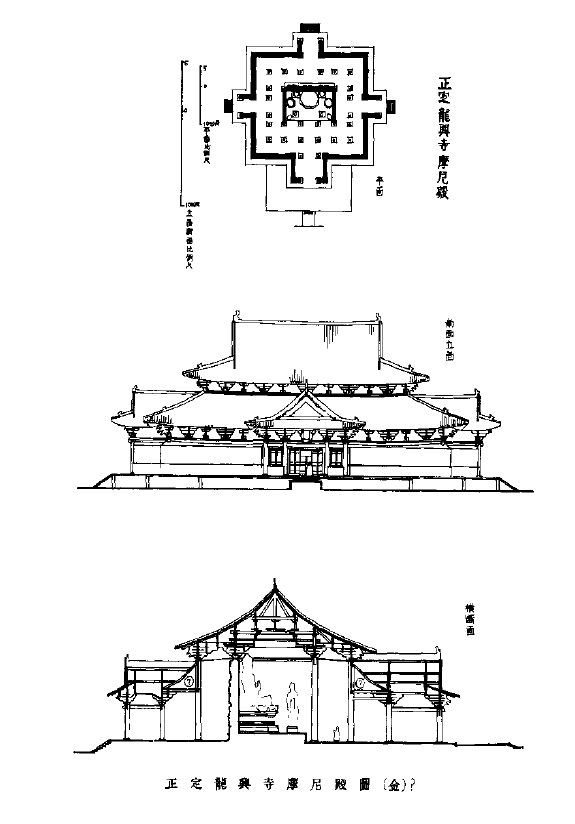
Floor plan, south elevation and section of Moni dian, by Liang Sicheng, 1933

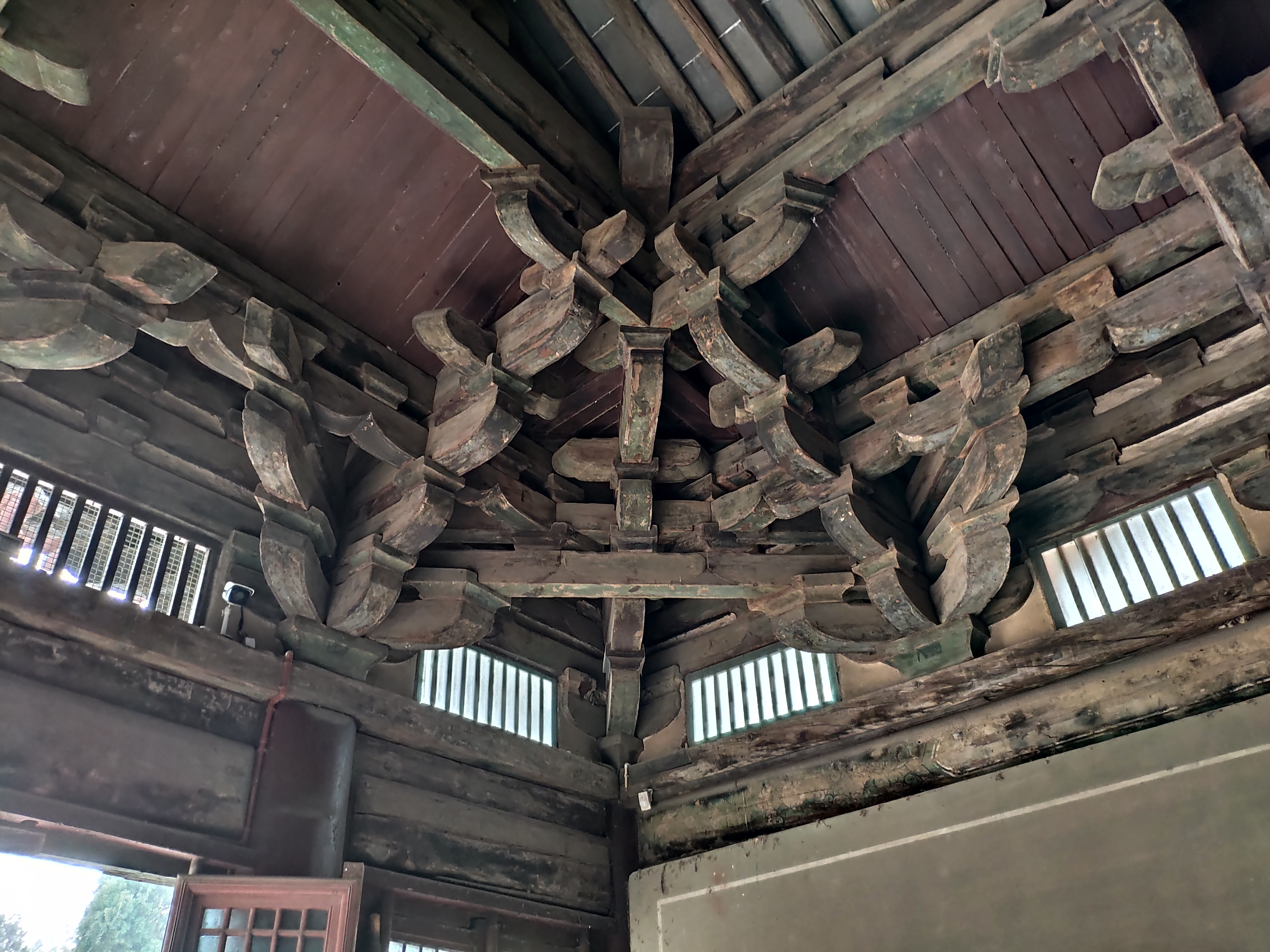
One of the Dougongs on the inner corner of Moni dian

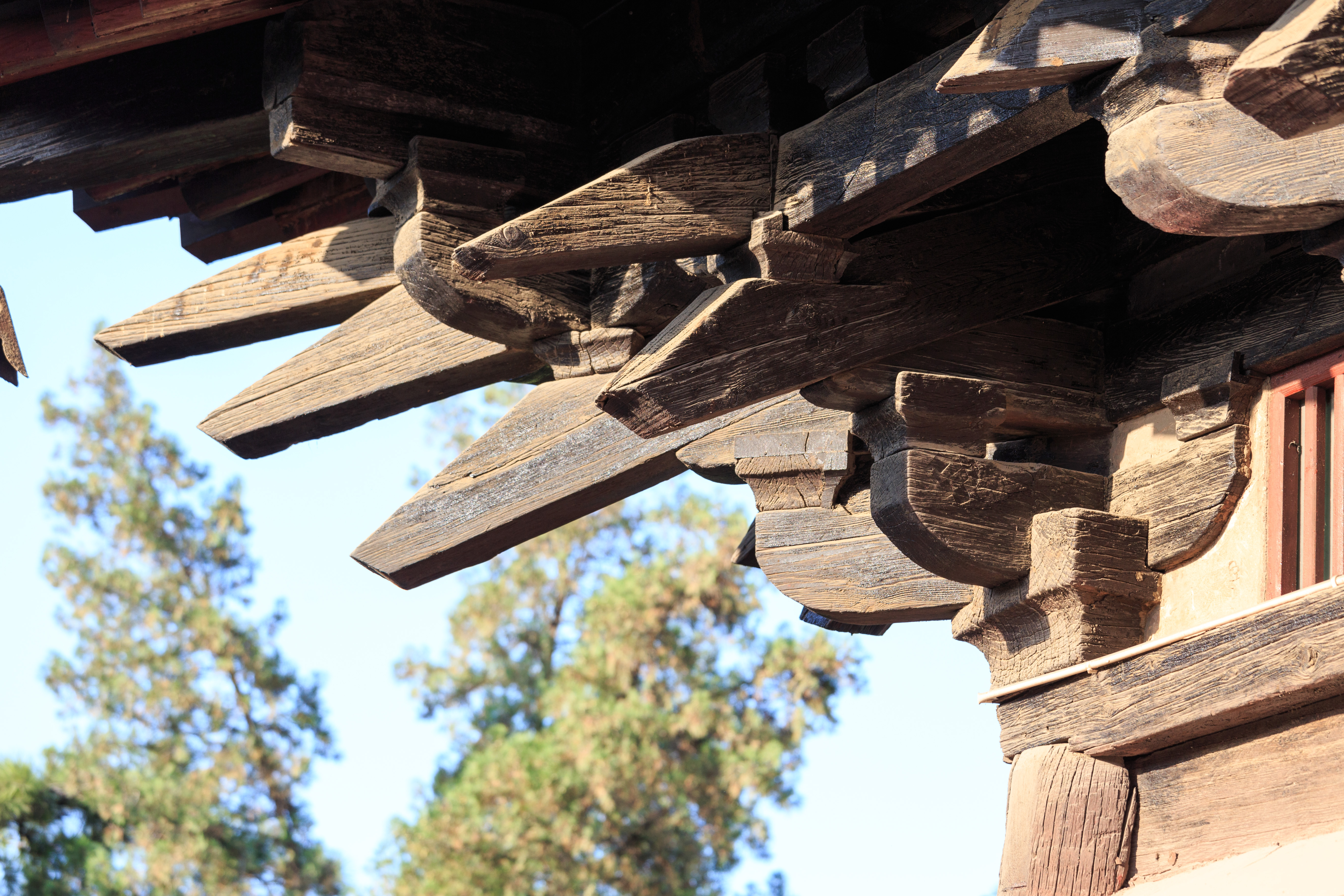
One of the Dougongs on the outer corner of Moni dian

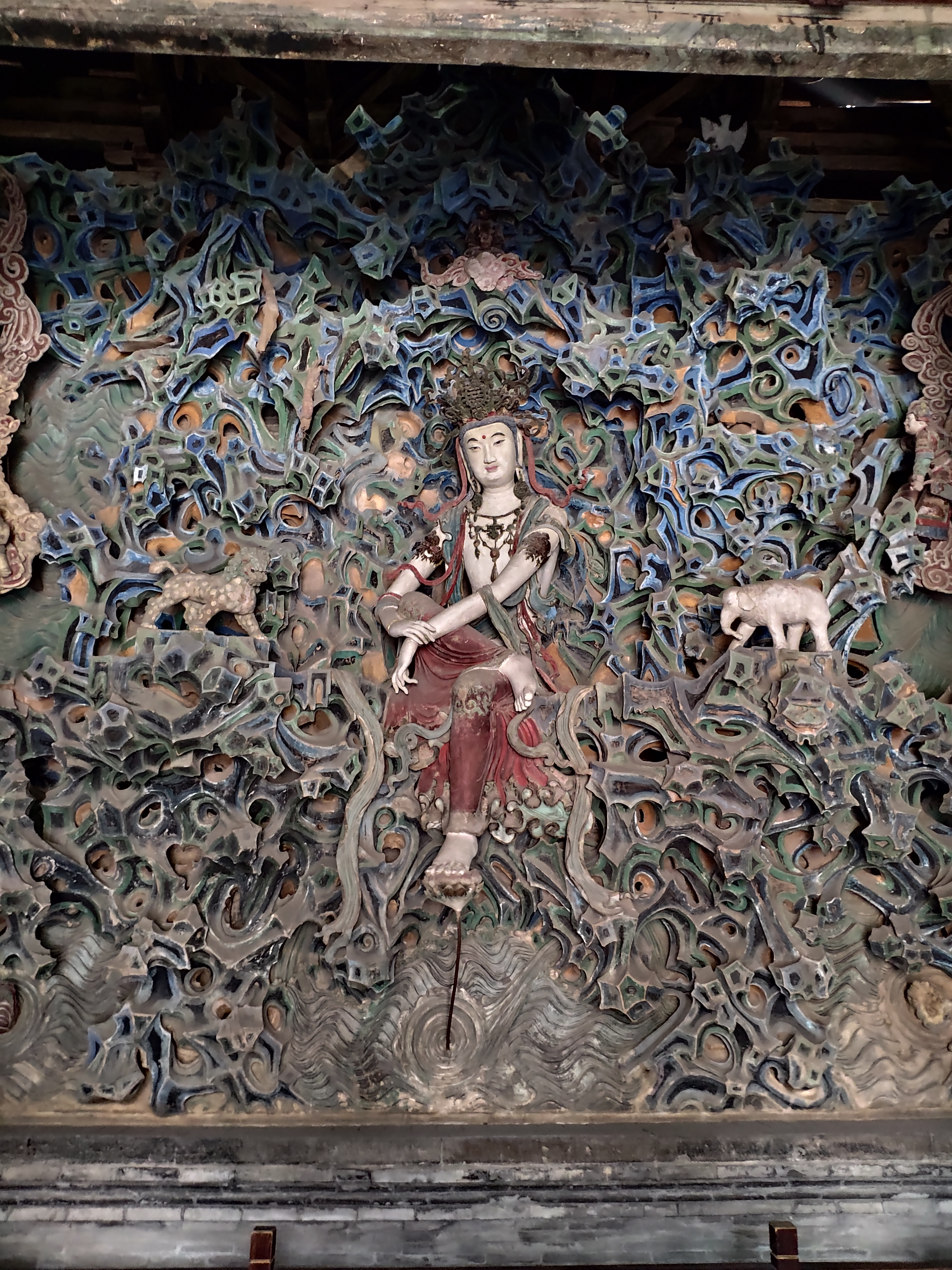
The Guanyin statue on the north side of Moni dian

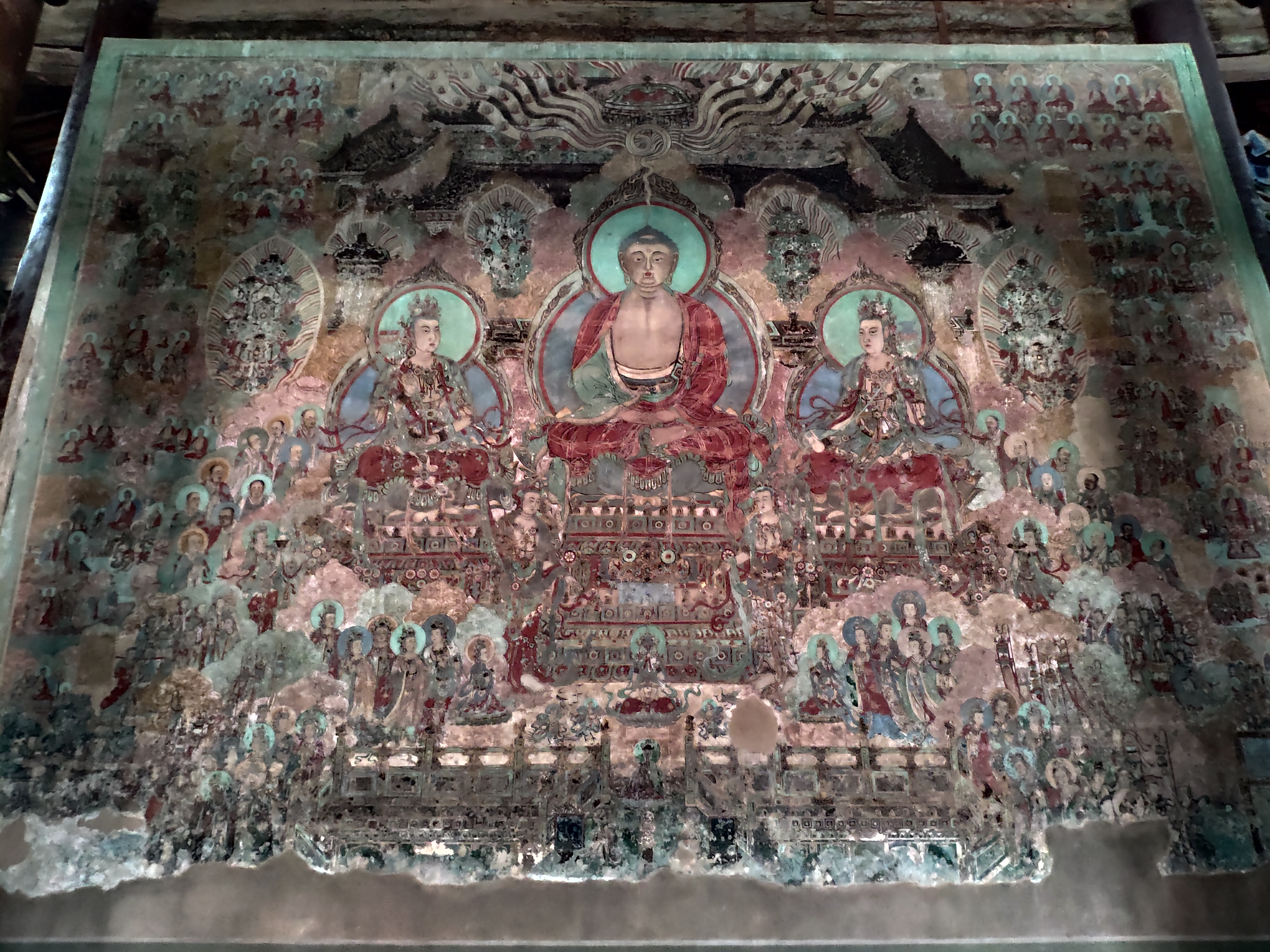
Part of the frescos of Moni dian

In the center of the hall stands a group of Buddha statues. The gilded Shijiamouni sits in the middle on an octangle Xumi platform with two of his disciples standing on both sides. Besides, Puxian (Samantabhadra) and Wenshu (Mañjuśrī) each sits on a lotus-like Xumi platform on the left and right ends of the group.

On the back of the group of statues (the north side), near the north entrance of the hall, where should have been a plain wall like in other similar halls, another group of statues can be seen occupying the whole wall. It is way more complicated and beautiful than the frontal one. Guanyin, the Buddhist figure representing great compassion and mercy in Chinese culture sits elegantly on a colored cloud in the center, with right foot stepping on a lotus, and left leg casually put on the right one. Around Guanyin, the reliefs depict the scene of a colorful mountain in the vast and wavy sea, which is supposed to be the Mount Putuo, where legends say Guanyin manifested itself and inspired people. That's why this statue is also called the "Guanyin in Mountain". This group of statues is unique for making the Buddhist figure look like a kind and pretty lady instead of the traditional serious or solemn image, giving people a closer and even intimate feeling. Some researchers believe this group of statues was made in the 42nd year of the Jiajing Period of the Ming dynasty (AD 1563) according to a tablet embedded in the wall. The famous Chinese writer Lu Xun love this Guanyin statue in particular and put a photo of it on his working desk so as to see it every day. Some opinions say it was built during the Song dynasty.

The inner surfaces of the walls of the Mani Hall are all decorated with fresco. They are painted in the same period when the hall was constructed. All of the frescos depict the Buddhist stories or figures. There were originally 388.64 square metres (4,183.3 sq ft) of frescos, of which 335.06 square metres (3,606.6 sq ft) remain. They are regarded as some of the finest pieces in the history of Chinese paintings.

=== Precept Platform ===
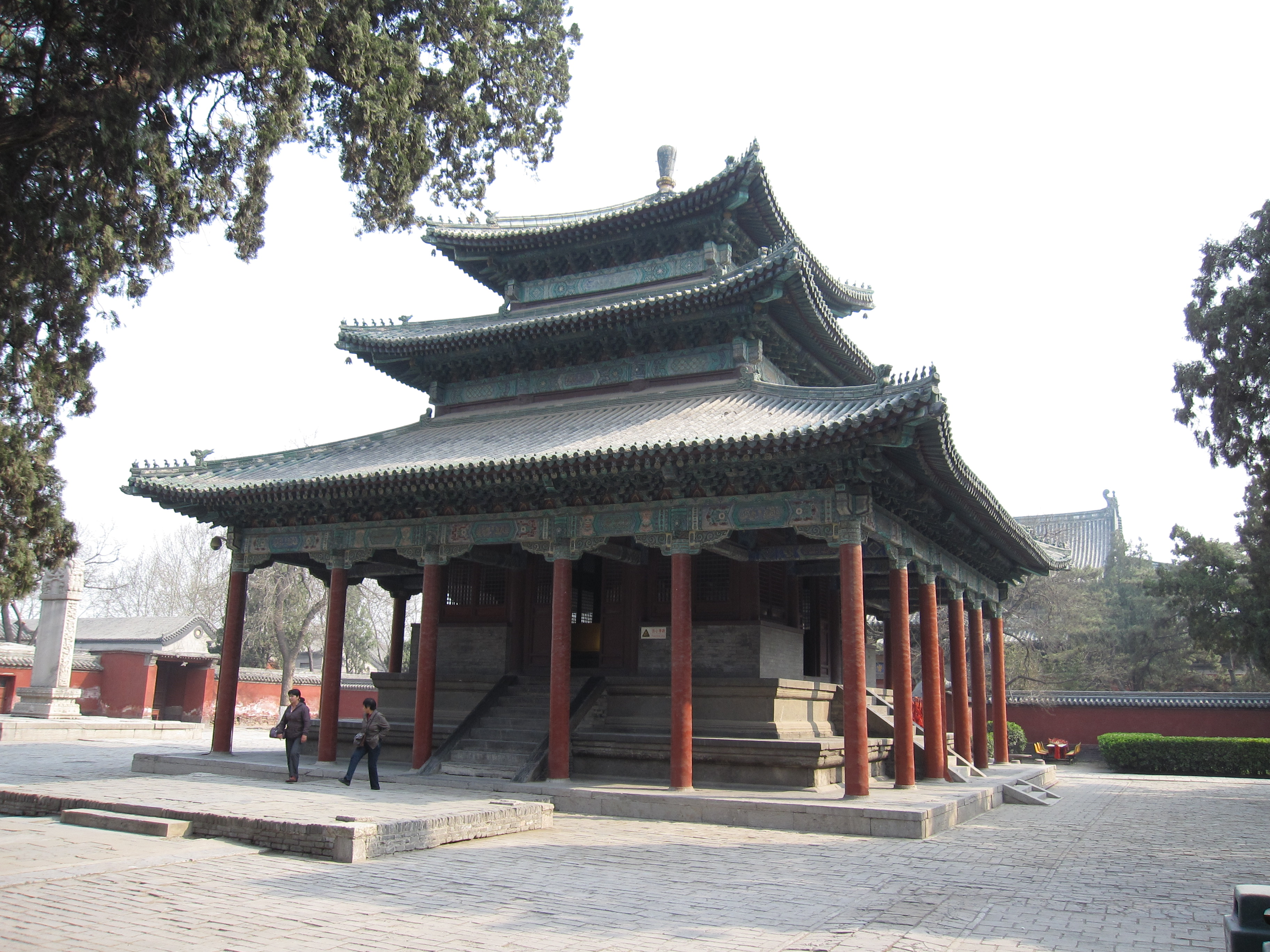
The Jie tan (Precept Platform), view from the northwest

The Precept Platform (simplified Chinese: 戒坛; traditional Chinese: 戒壇; pinyin: Jiè Tán) is the place for monks and worshipers to undertake the precepts of Buddhism and for Buddhist ceremonies.

The platform consists of a two-level square stone platform in the form of Xumi platform (a style of the stone platform in ancient Chinese architecture) and a wooden structure covering it. The first level of the stone platform is 12.93m by 12.93m in layout and 0.88m in height; the second level is 10.35m by 10.35m by 1.16m. The stone platform is believed to be constructed during the Song dynasty.

However, the wooden structure, in the style of a tented roof, shows typical Qing style features, where the Dougongs are small and mainly function as decoration instead of key structural elements. It is inferred that the wooden structure was constructed during the early Qing dynasty.

The stone platform, covered by a wooden structure, sits a bronze double-faced Buddha statue, which was cast in the 6th year of the Hongzhi Period of the Ming dynasty (AD 1493). The south face is Amituofo and the north face is Yaoshi.

There was a circle of cloister around, which was recorded by Liang Sicheng in 1933 when he did a survey in Longxing Temple. But it can no longer be seen today.

=== Zhuanlunzang Pavillion and Cishi Pavillion ===
The Zhuanlunzang Pavilion (simplified Chinese: 转轮藏阁; traditional Chinese: 轉輪藏閣; pinyin: Zhuànlúnzàng Gé) and the Pavilion of Mi Le (simplified Chinese: 慈氏阁; traditional Chinese: 慈氏閣; pinyin: Císhì Gé) are both two-floor buildings. They are located to the north of the precept platform with the Zhuanlunzang Pavilion in the west and the Pavilion of Maitreya in the east, face to face. There is no clear record of when these pavilions were constructed. However, judging from the structural features, researchers believe the Zhuanlunzang Pavilion was constructed during the early Song dynasty, while the Pavilion of Maitreya was built later.

The Zhuanlunzang Pavilion acted as the library in the monastery. An octagonal Zhuanlunzang (simplified Chinese: 转轮藏; traditional Chinese: 轉輪藏; pinyin: Zhuànlúnzàng, a rotating wooden used as a sūtra cabinet) was installed in the center of its ground floor, which remains intact today but is no longer used. Zhuanlunzangs are not rare in history, but an early-built large one that was kept today like this in the Longxing Temple is rarely seen in other parts of the world. To accommodate this Zhuanlunzang, the building adopted some unique structural techniques, including shifting the columns, using some curved beams, etc. This structure system drew particular attention from architects and researchers including Liang Sicheng.

The Cishi Pavilion is dedicated to the future Buddha Mi Le (Maitreya), with "Cishi" (慈氏, lit: "The Compassionate One") being one of his epithets. The building has two floors while the first floor is only a circle of passageways. In the center stands a 7.4-metre (24 ft) tall statue of Mi Le that was carved from a single piece of wood and decorated with colorful paints. This statue was made during the Song dynasty.

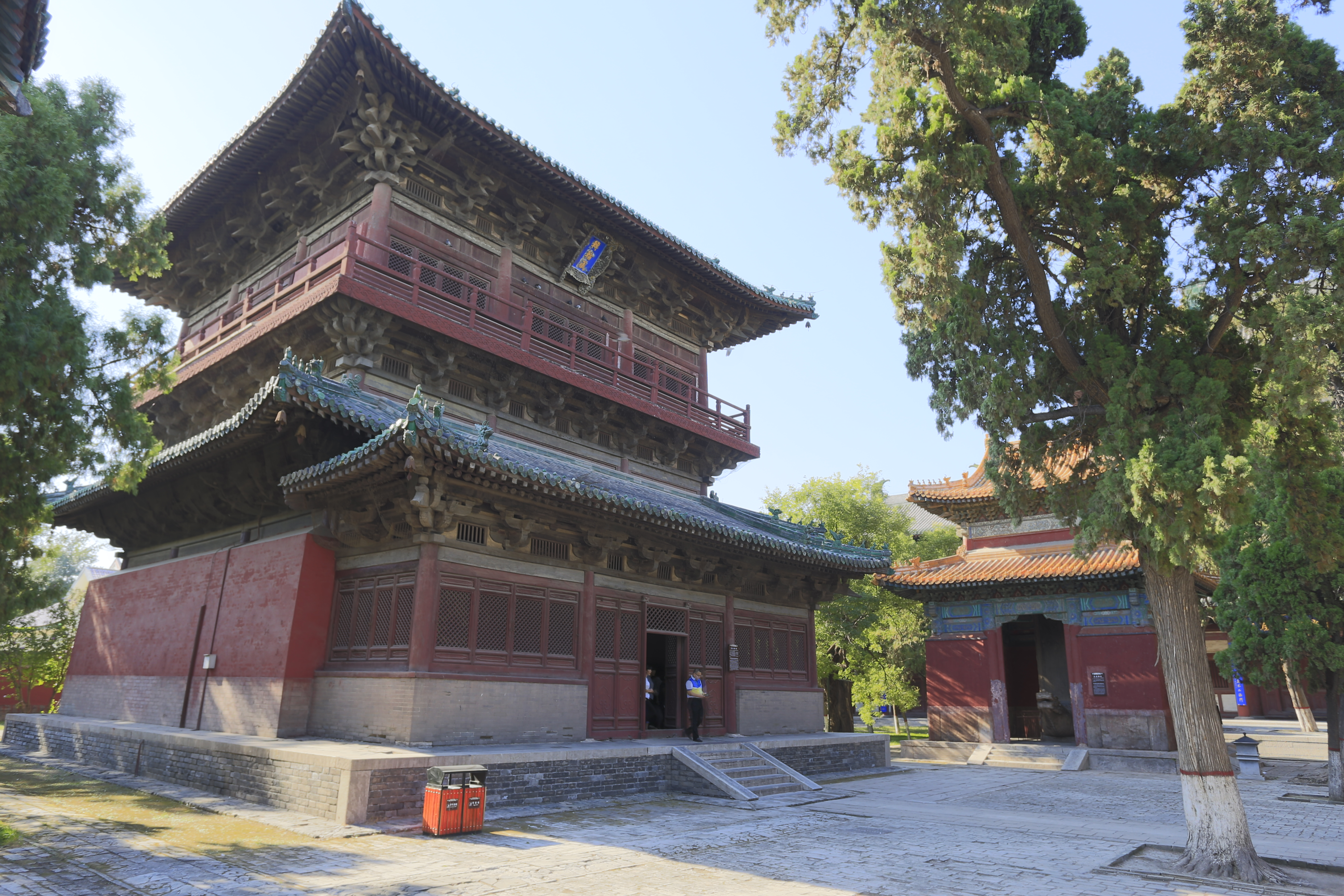
The Zhuanlunzang ge (Pavilion of Zhuanlunzang), view from the southeast

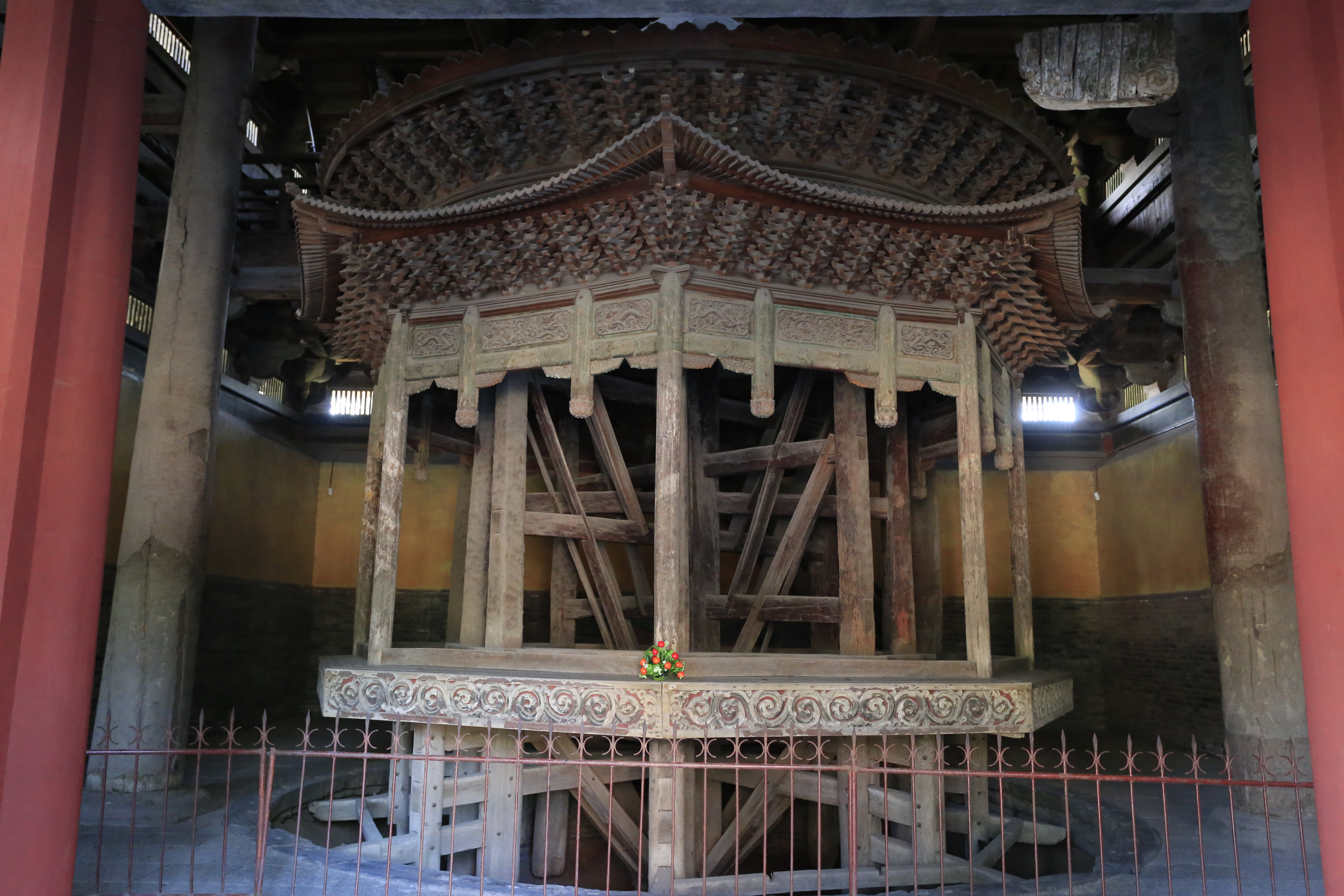
The Zhuanlunzang installed in Zhuanlunzang ge

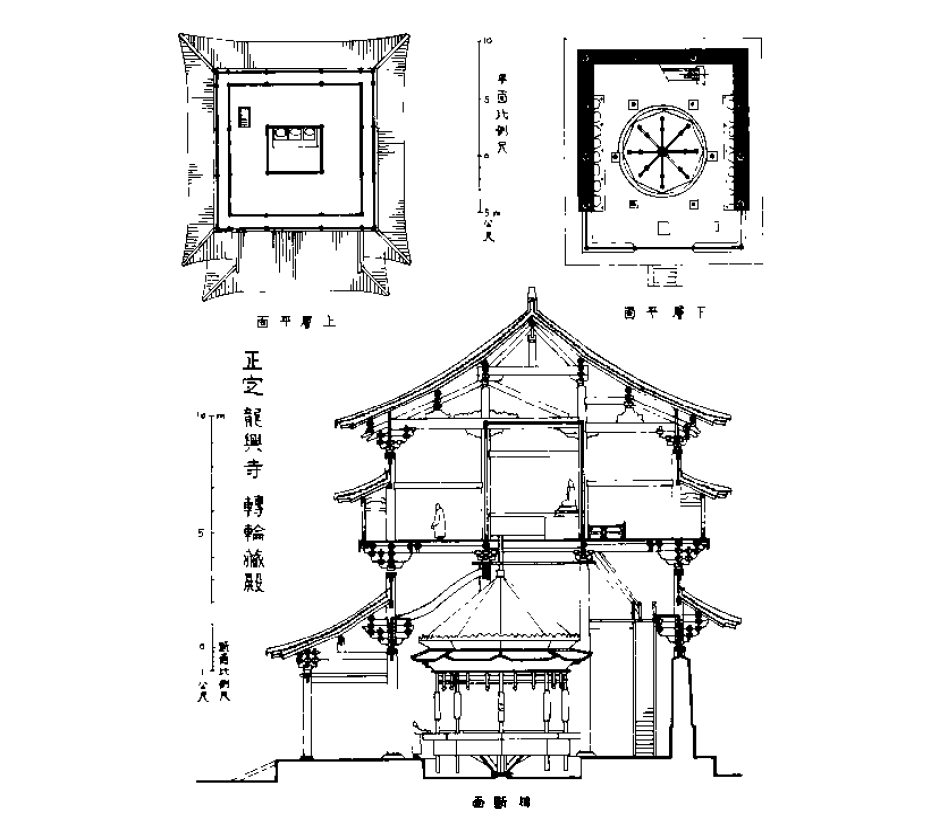
Floor plan of first and ground floor and section of Zhuanlunzang ge, by Liang Sicheng, 1933

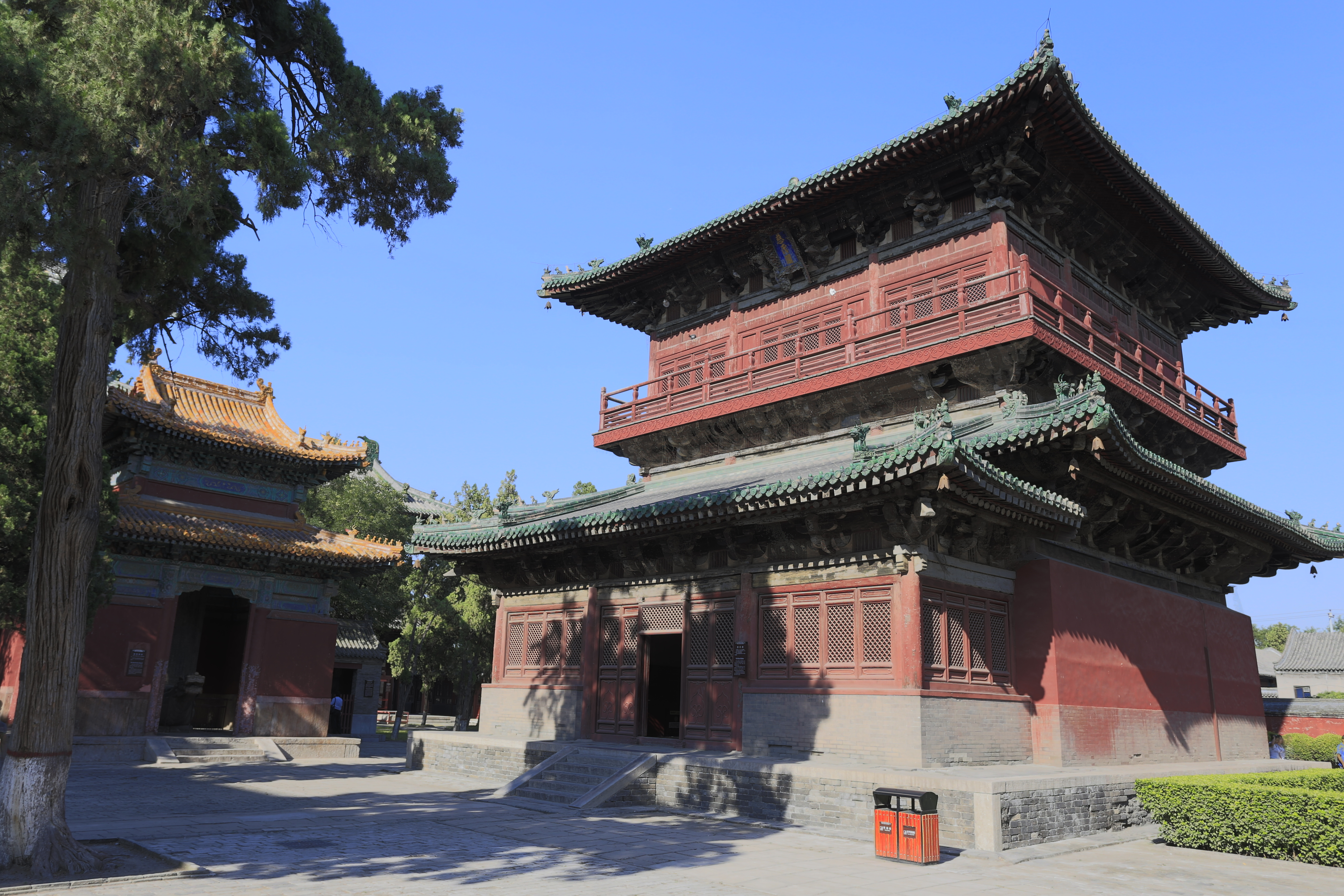
The Cishi ge (Cishi Pavilion), view from the southwest

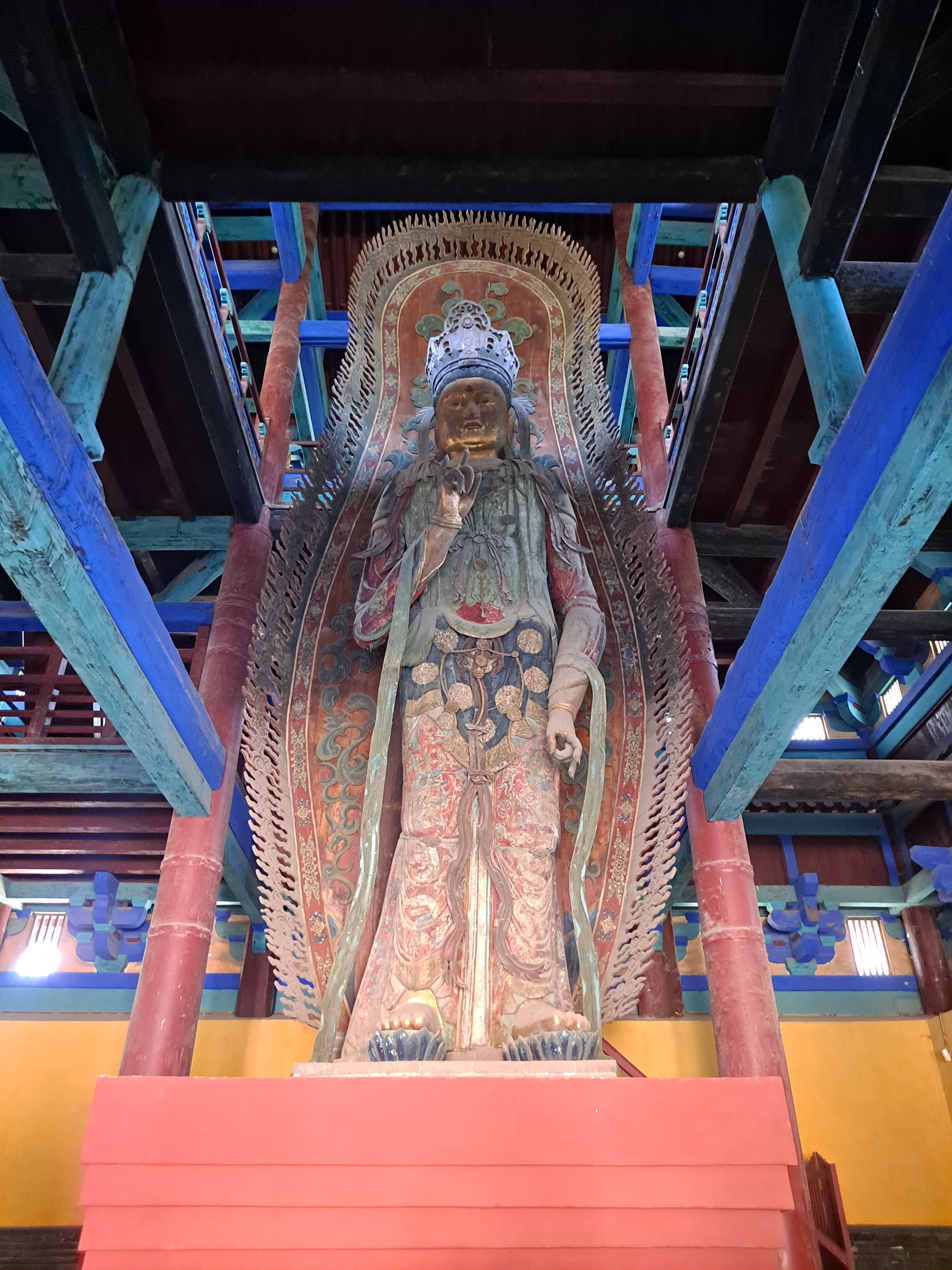
Statue of Mi Le Fo enshrined in the Cishi ge

=== Royal Stele Pavilions ===
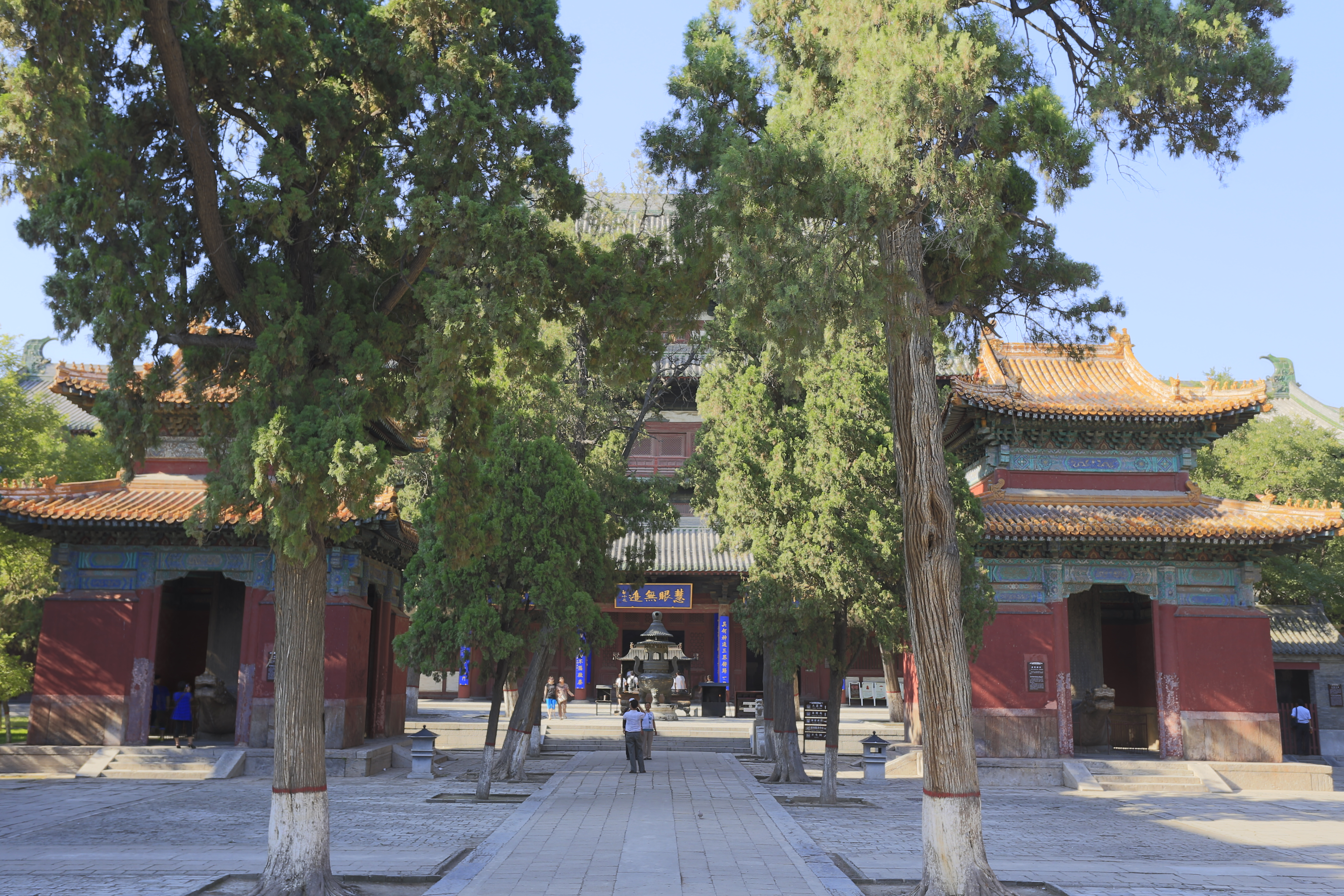
The two Royal Stele Pavilions (the buildings on the left and right)

The two Royal Stele Pavilions (Chinese: 御碑亭; pinyin: Yù Bēi Tíng) are located in between the Hall of Great Mercy and the Zhuanlunzang Pavilion and the Pavilion of Maitreya, on both sides of the axis, facing the south. They each cover a royal stele on which engraved an article written by the Emperor.

The east stele shows the article hand-written by the Kangxi Emperor during the 52nd year of the Kangxi Period of the Qing dynasty (AD 1713) both in traditional Chinese and in Manchu characters. The west shows the article by the Qianlong Emperor hand-written in the 45th year of the Qianlong Period of the Qing dynasty (AD 1780). The west one is engraved in four languages: traditional Chinese, Manchu on the front (south) and Tibetan, Mongolian on the back.

Both pavilions are in a regular square floor plan, which is 6.88m by 6.88m and 12.97m in height. They have four arch doors on their four sides, allowing people to read the texts on both the front and back sides of the steles. The roofs of the pavilions are in East Asian hip-and-gable roof style, covered with yellow glazed tiles. The color of these tiles manifests the hierarchical status of these pavilions since yellow tiles are only allowed to be used on royal buildings in ancient China.

=== Dabei Pavillion ===
The Dabei Pavilion (simplified Chinese: 大悲阁; traditional Chinese: 大悲閣; pinyin: Dàbēi Gé) is the major hall of the whole monastery of the Longxing Temple, which is the largest building and accommodates the largest Buddha statue.

The tower was constructed during the early Song dynasty and was restored during the Yuan, Ming, and Qing dynasties at the orders of the emperors. In 1933, when Liang Sicheng came to survey the Longxing Temple, he recorded that the Dabei Pavilion was also called the Foxiang Tower (simplified Chinese: 佛香阁; traditional Chinese: 佛香閣, meaning the Tower of Buddhist Incense). The original tower had already collapsed back then and a new one was under construction. However, the new one, finished in 1944, was designed as a huge but simple brick shrine to cover the bronze statue. The original style was discarded, and the affiliated buildings were ignored due to the limit of fundings. In 1992, the State Bureau of Cultural Relics decided to reconstruct the Dabei Pavilion and its affiliated buildings. The project finished on September 15, 1999.

The reconstructed tower is in the Song style as is seen today. The tower itself is a 35.5 m (116 ft)-tall three-floor building with East Asian hip-and-gable roof style. The ground floor is seven Jians by six (28.98m by 27.87m), occupying an area of 1,643.5 square metres (17,690 sq ft). The affiliated buildings, Yushu Pavilion and Jiqing Pavilion, in the identical style, structure, and dimensions, stand to the east and west of the Dabei Pavilion and are connected to the tower with wooden arch bridges on the second floor. They are both 21 m (69 ft)-tall two-floor buildings with East Asian hip-and-gable roof style, the ground floor of which are five Jians by four Jians (19.3 by 12.19 metres (63.3 ft × 40.0 ft)).

In the center of Dabei Pavilion, on a 2.25 m (7 ft 5 in)-tall Xumi platform, stands a huge bronze statue of the Qianshou Qianyan Guanyin (Chinese: 千手千眼觀音; pinyin: Qiānshǒu Qiānyǎn Guānyīn), a manifestation of Guanyin with a “thousand hands and thousand eyes”, which is 21.3 metres (70 ft) in height. The thousand hands and eyes are abstractly represented with 42 arms and one eye on the palm of each hand. This statue is the major and iconic statue of the Longxing Temple. The locals called Longxing Temple "Big Buddha Temple" (Chinese: 大佛寺; pinyin: Dàfò Sì) because of this statue. It is listed as one of "the four preciouses of Hebei Province" (the other three are the Liaodi Pagoda, Anji Bridge, and the Iron Lion of Cangzhou).

The statue was cast in the 4th year of the Kaibao Period of Song dynasty (AD 971) at the order of Emperor Taizu of Song, the founding emperor of the Song dynasty. The emperors in the following dynasties put particular attention to it and ordered several restorations. It was also loved and worshipped by the local people, who often donated money and treasures for the daily maintenance of the statue.

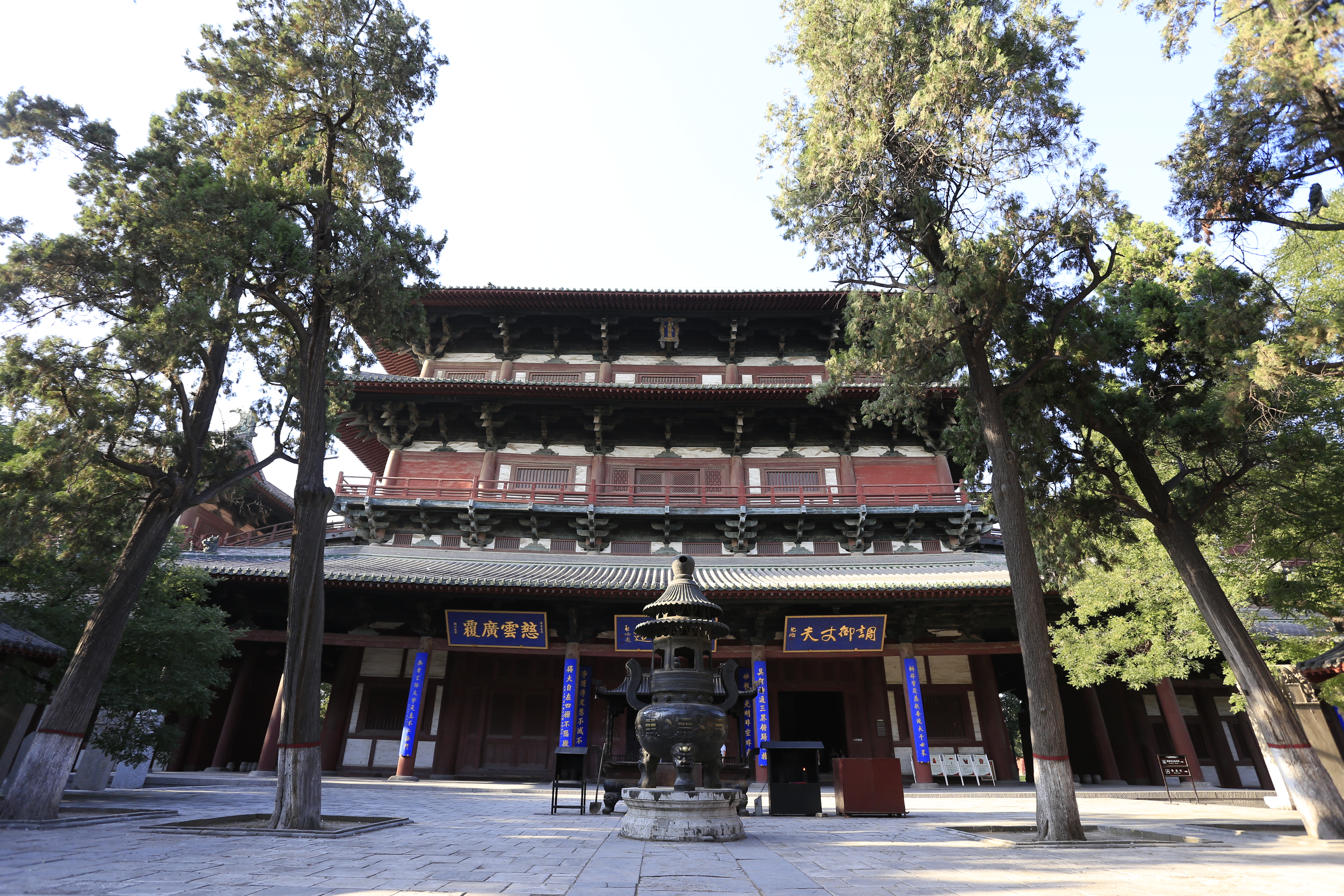
The Dabei ge (Tower of Great Compassion)

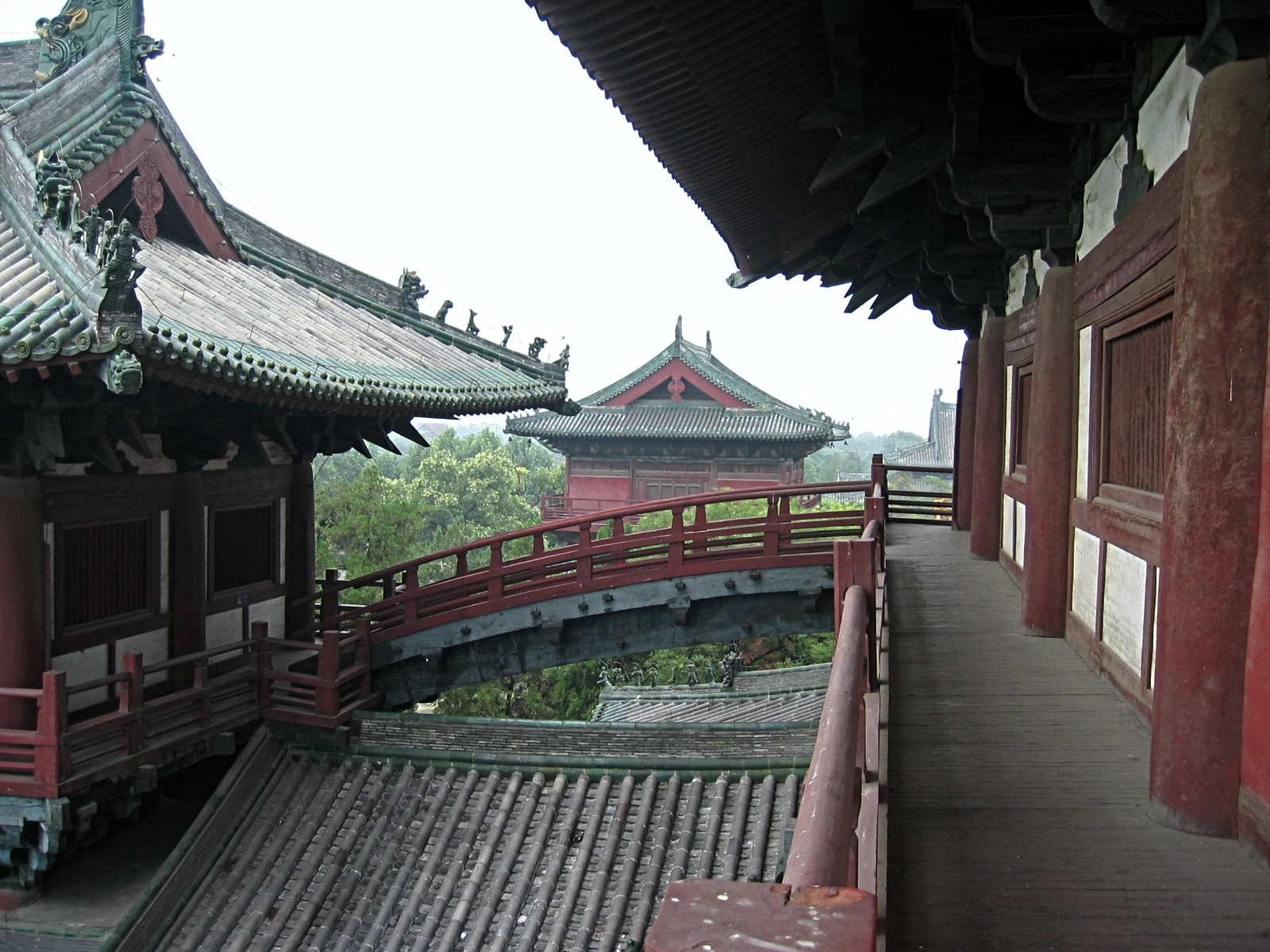
The arch bridge connecting the Dabei ge and Yushu Pavilion; view from the balcony to the south; the roof of Pavilion of Maitreya can be seen in the distance

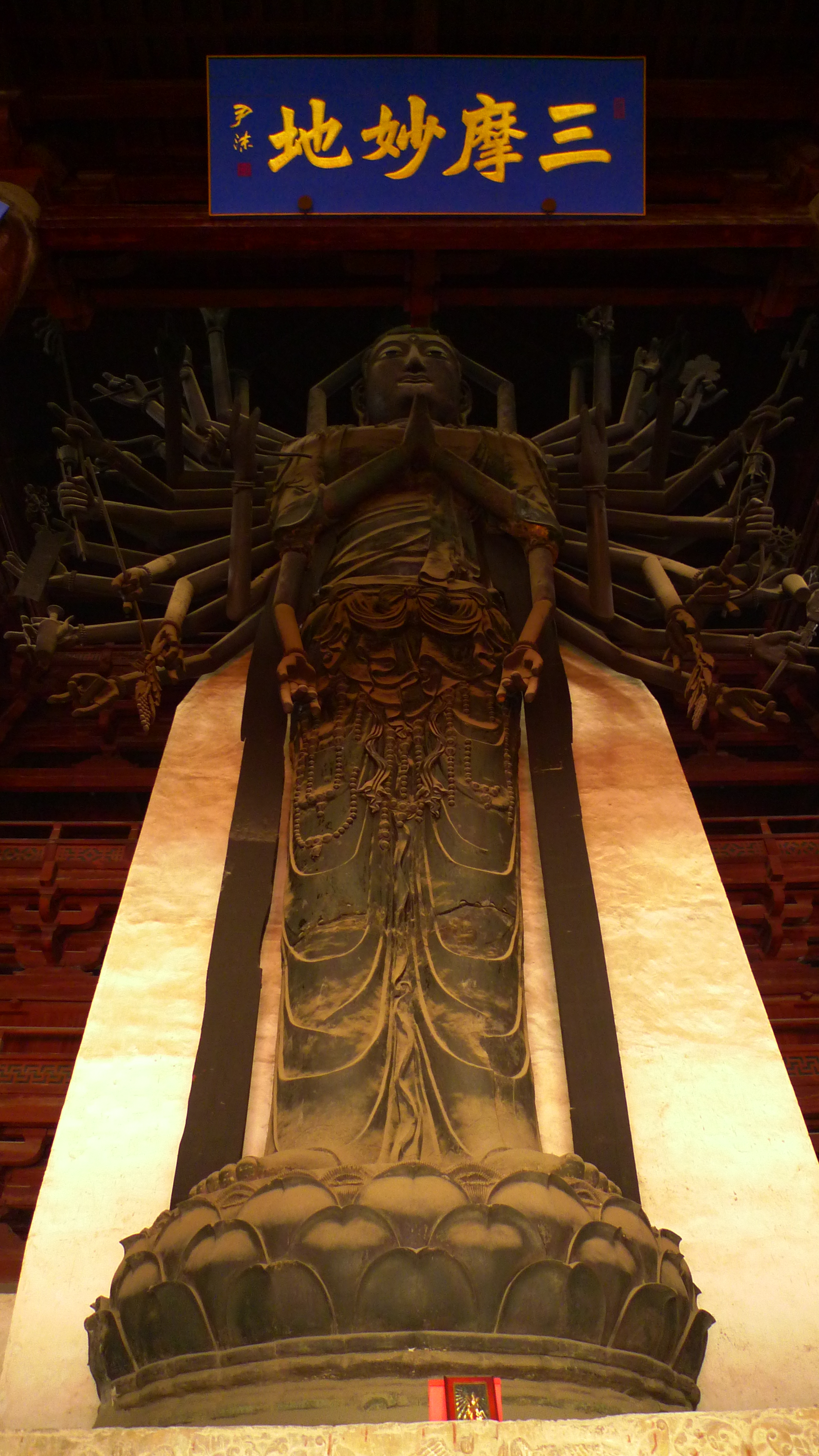
The statue of the Thousand-Armed Thousand-Eyed Guanyin in the Dabei ge

=== Others ===
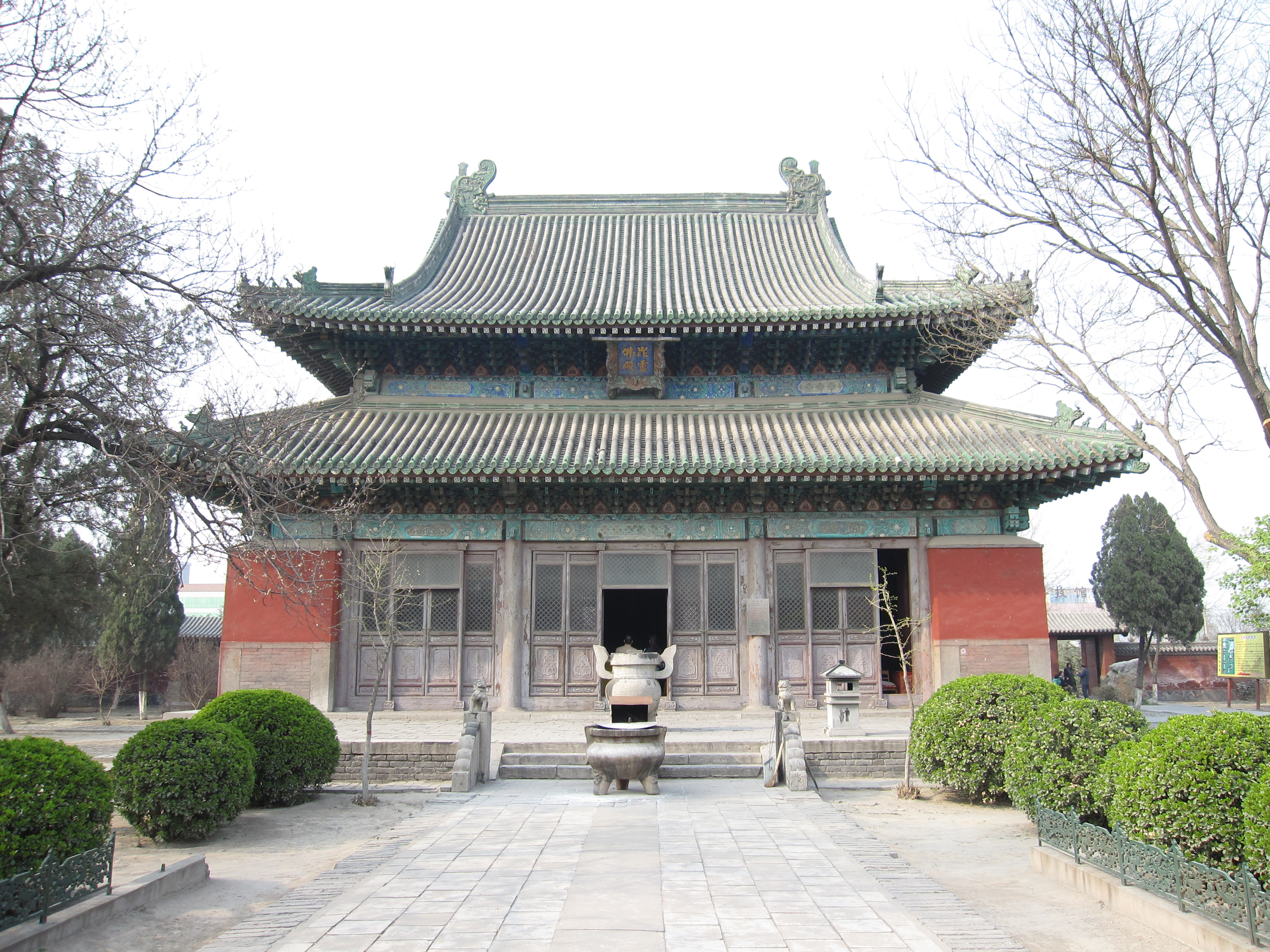
The Pilu dian (Hall of Piluzhena)

Except for the major buildings mentioned above, there are several other halls and pavilions located behind (to the north of) the Dabei Pavilion:

- Mituo Hall (simplified Chinese: 弥陀殿; traditional Chinese: 彌陀殿; pinyin: Mítuó Diàn) is located right to the north of the Dabei Pavilion. Constructed in the 5th year of the Zhengde Period of the Ming dynasty (AD 1510), it is a single floor building with East Asian hip-and-gable roof. Its dimensions five Jians by four Jians. A statue of Amituofo (Amitābha) is worshipped in this hall.
- Piluzhena Hall (simplified Chinese: 毗卢殿; traditional Chinese: 毗盧殿; pinyin: Pílú Diàn) was constructed in 1959 to accommodate the statue of Piluzhena (Vairocana) moved here in the same year from the Chongyin Temple. The statue, 6.27 metres (20.6 ft) in height, was finely designed in the appearance of a pagoda. It consists of a thousand individual statues of Piluzhena that are divided into three levels. It is the last building on the main axis and marks the north end of it.
- Longquan Well Pavilion (simplified Chinese: 龙泉井亭; traditional Chinese: 龍泉井亭; pinyin: Lóngquán Jǐng Tíng) is located in the northeast corner of the garden in the north end of the whole monastery. First constructed in the 7th year of the Tianshun Period of the Ming dynasty (AD 1463), it was the only building with a "Lu roof" (simplified Chinese: 盝顶; traditional Chinese: 盝頂; pinyin: Lù Dǐng, a roof style of ancient Chinese architecture with a plain in the top center and four slope roofs around it) in Longxing Temple. It acts as the shelter of an octangle well called "Longquan Well" ("Longquan" means "the spring of the Chinese dragon").
- A Paifang is located in between the Mani Hall and the Precept Platform. It is constructed as part of a partition wall that divides the whole monastery of Longxing Temple into two parts, the front (south) part and the major (north) part. Liang Sicheng recorded this paifang as a small but exquisite piece of architecture. The paifang standing there today was reconstructed according to Liang's record in 1986.

== See also ==
- List of Buddhist temples
- Chinese Buddhism
