= Iron Lion of Cangzhou =

Lion statue in Cangzhou, Hebei, China

Coordinates: 38°12′21.8″N 117°0′57.20″E

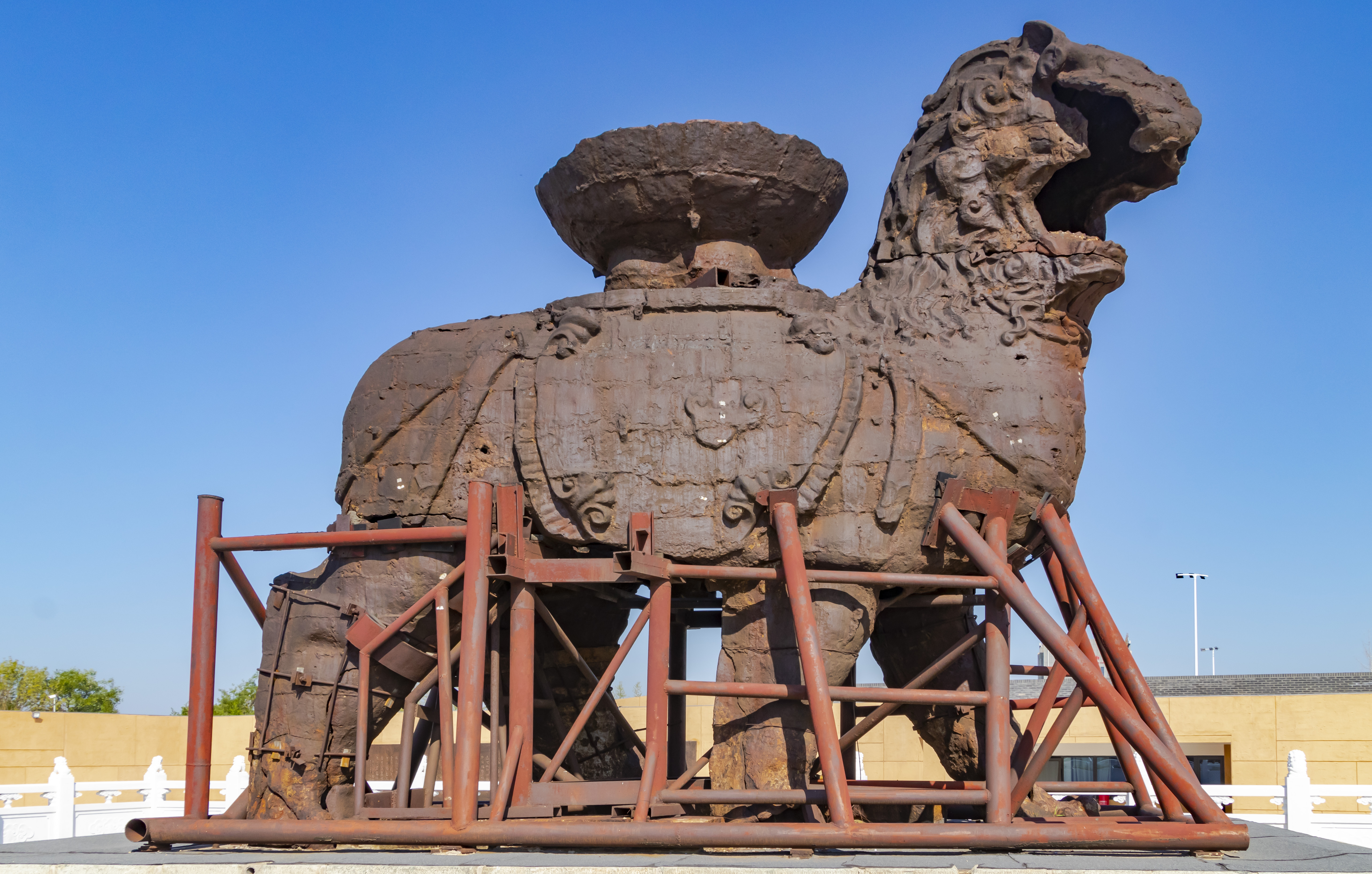
Iron Lion of Cangzhou in 2020

The Iron Lion of Cangzhou (Chinese: 铁狮子; pinyin: Tiě Shīzi), also known as the Sea-suppressing Howler (Chinese: 镇海吼; pinyin: zhèn hǎi hǒu), is a cast iron sculpture located in Cangzhou City, in Hebei Province, China, about 180 km (110 mi) southwest of Beijing. Cast in the Later Zhou dynasty in 953, the iron lion is the largest known and oldest surviving iron-cast artwork in China. It is considered one of the Four Treasures of Hebei.

== Description and history ==
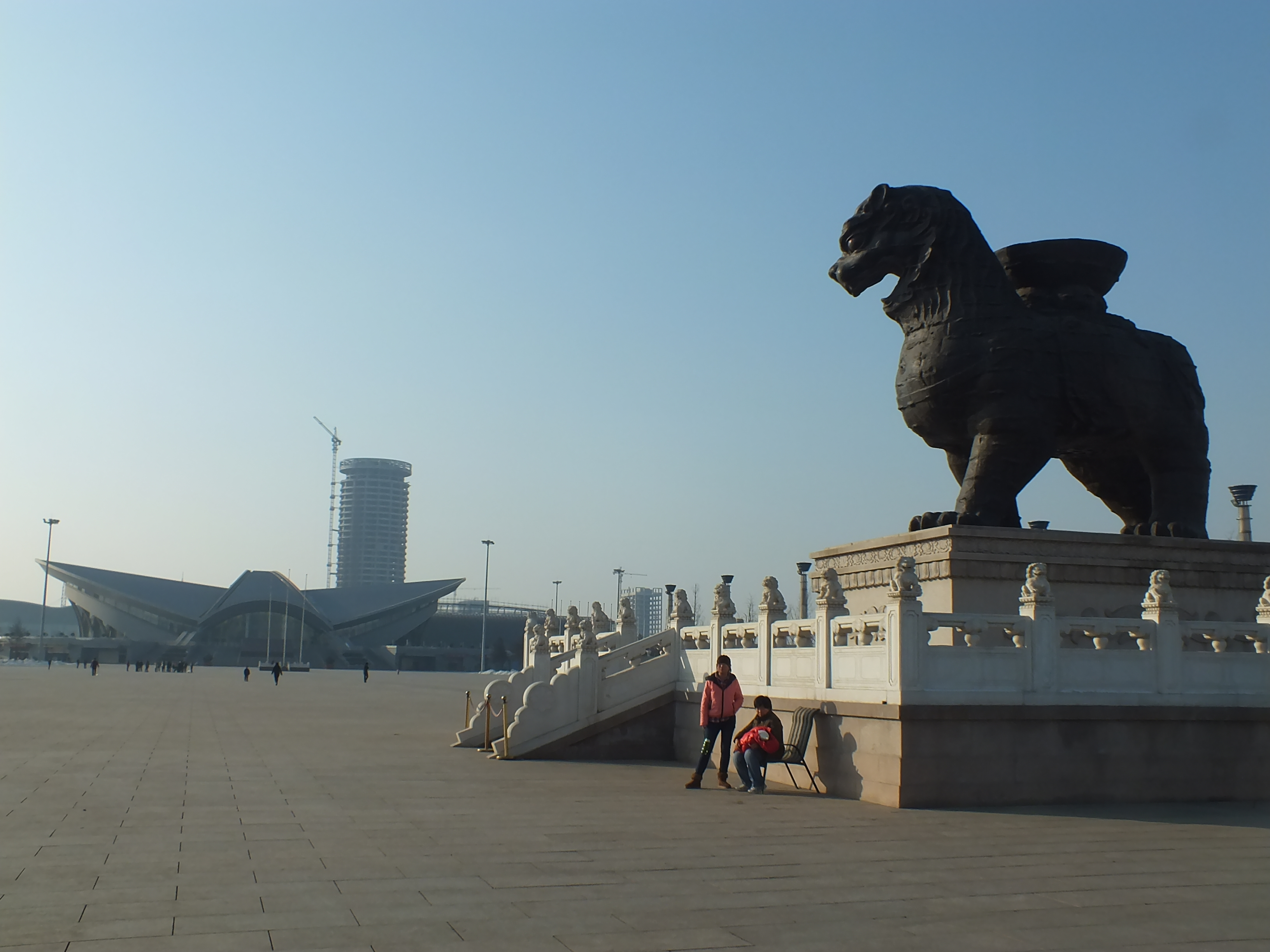
Recreation of the Iron Lion

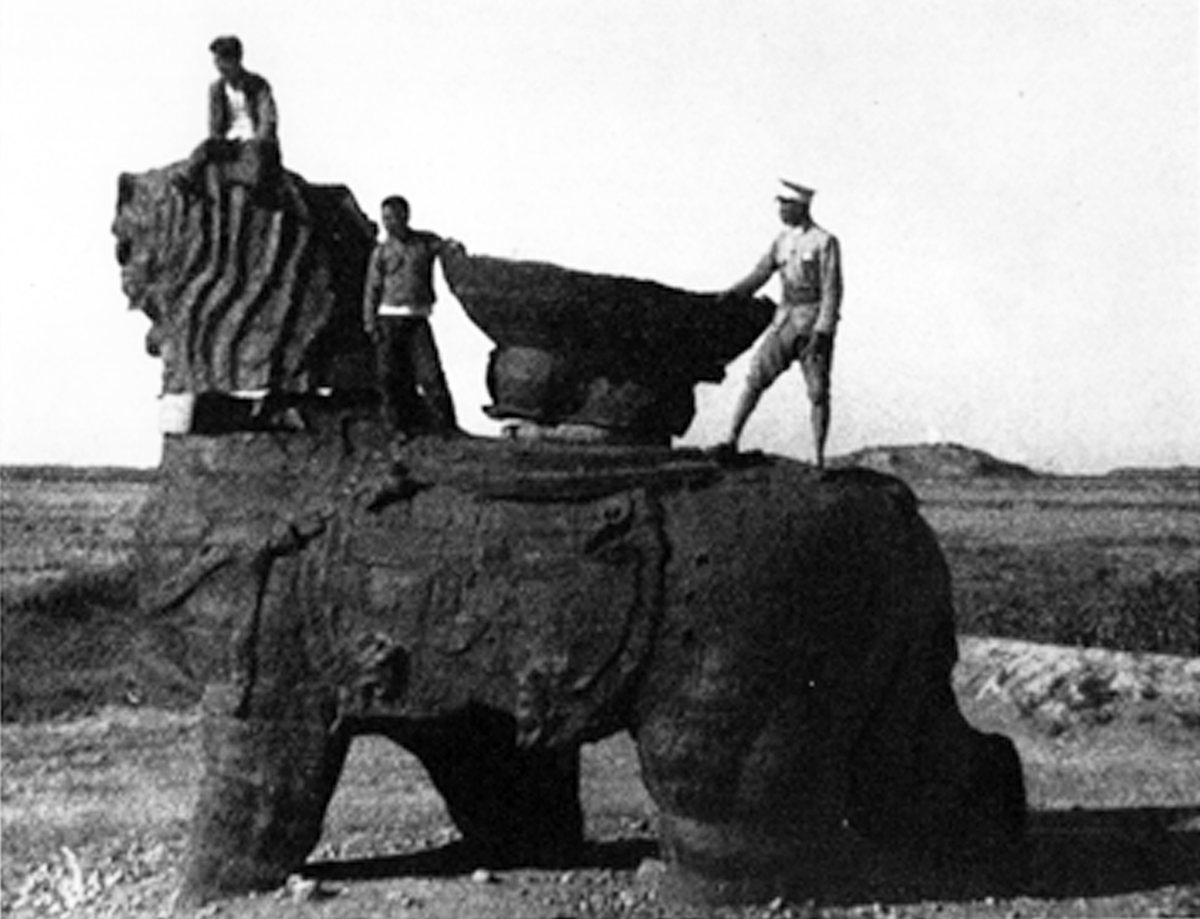
The Iron Lion in 1910, photographed by American engineer Thomas Read.

The Iron Lion of Cangzhou is 5.78 m (19 ft) high, 6.5 m (21 ft 4 in) long, 3.17 m (10 ft 5 in) wide, and has an estimated weight of 40 tonnes (44 tons). (Note: Size and mass of the sculpture according to Du, other sources state different values.) According to Donald B. Wagner, it is 5.4 m high, 5.35 m long, 3 m wide, and weighs 50 tonnes. On its back, it carries a basin-shaped lotus throne with a maximum diameter of about 2 m (6 ft 7 in) and a height of 70 cm (28 in). Presumably, the iron lion was originally displayed inside a Buddhist temple and carried a bronze statue of the bodhisattva Manjusri on the lotus seat. The bodhisattva may have been removed as early as the anti-Buddhist campaigns of Emperor Shizong (r. 954–959), or at some other date, presumably because of the high value of the bronze.

The iron lion has long been a cultural icon in Cangzhou. According to legend, the Lion appeared from heaven and roared at an evil dragon which was causing floods, ending them. The sculpture was lauded by a local poet, Ji Ruiqi, in the Qing period.

The iron lion remains an object of pride in Cangzhou: the city is referred to as the "Lion City" and a local beer (Cangzhou Lion Beer) is named after the sculpture. In 2011, a cast replica of the sculpture was made, 1.3 times the size of the original statue and weighing 120 tons. The replica stands in Cangzhou's Shicheng Park. Another (less exact) replica of the lion stands in Shijiazhuang's Water Park.

== Casting ==
The iron lion was cast using a piece-moulding technique in a single mould. In this technique, which has also been used in ancient Chinese bronze-casting, a clay model of the sculpture is made and covered with a new layer of clay after drying. This outer layer of clay is then cut into pieces and removed before it dries completely. In the next step, material is taken off the surface of the inner clay model in order to provide room for pouring the iron between the outer and inner mould. Hence, "seams" visible on the cast do not represent boundaries between separate iron pieces, but are impressions of the seams between the pieces of the outer mould. Casting did proceed in several stages between which the iron already poured into the mould did cool down. As a result, fault lines were introduced into the cast at regular intervals which mark the filling height of the mould at successive casting stages. These fault lines were bridged by the craftsmen carrying out the cast with pieces of wrought iron which were plunged into the solidifying surface of the iron from the previous pour and then covered in the next pour. Traces of these bridging pegs as well as those of wrought iron spacers used to separate the outer mould from the core can still be found in the sculpture.

== Conservation ==
Over the years, the iron lion sculpture has sustained various kinds of damage. By 1603, its tail had been lost. In 1803, a storm toppled the statue resulting in damage to its snout and belly. In 1886, it was re-erected with stones and bricks on the orders of a local magistrate. When American engineer Thomas Read inspected the statue in 1910 (see photograph), the statue had partially sunken into the ground, and the casting had broken into four pieces, with the lower jaw having dropped to the ground and since disappeared.

Since 1957, the sculpture has undergone five major restoration projects, four of which backfired and worsened the condition of the lion. In 1957, a small pavilion was built around it to protect it from the elements, and the ground under the lion's feet was dug out. The statue was reinforced using steel, with the guidance of Soviet conservators. In 1961, it was listed as a national key cultural relic. After conservators determined that the 1957 pavilion was worsening corrosion due to condensation inside the structure, it was removed in 1982. In 1984, the iron lion was remounted on a stone pedestal. Its legs were filled with a sulfate compound. Probably due to these interventions, cracks began to appear in the sculpture. In 1994, conservators reinforced the inside of the lion with steel tubes and rubber pads. After cracking continued unabated, most of the sulfate compound was removed during restoration work carried out in 2000. In 2021, a massive roof was built over the statue to protect it from the elements, as part of a new archaeological park surrounding the lion.
