= Liaodi Pagoda =

Historic pagoda in Hebei Province, China

Coordinates: 38°30′37″N 114°59′48″E

- Traditional Chinese: 料敵塔
- Simplified Chinese: 料敌塔
Transcriptions
Standard Mandarin
- Hanyu Pinyin: Liàodí Tǎ
- Wade–Giles: Liao^{4}-ti^{2} T'a^{3}
- IPA: [ljâʊ.tǐ tʰà]
Yue: Cantonese
- Yale Romanization: Liuh-dihk Taap
- Jyutping: Liu6-Dik6 Taap3
- IPA: [liw˨.tɪk̚˨ tʰap̚˧]

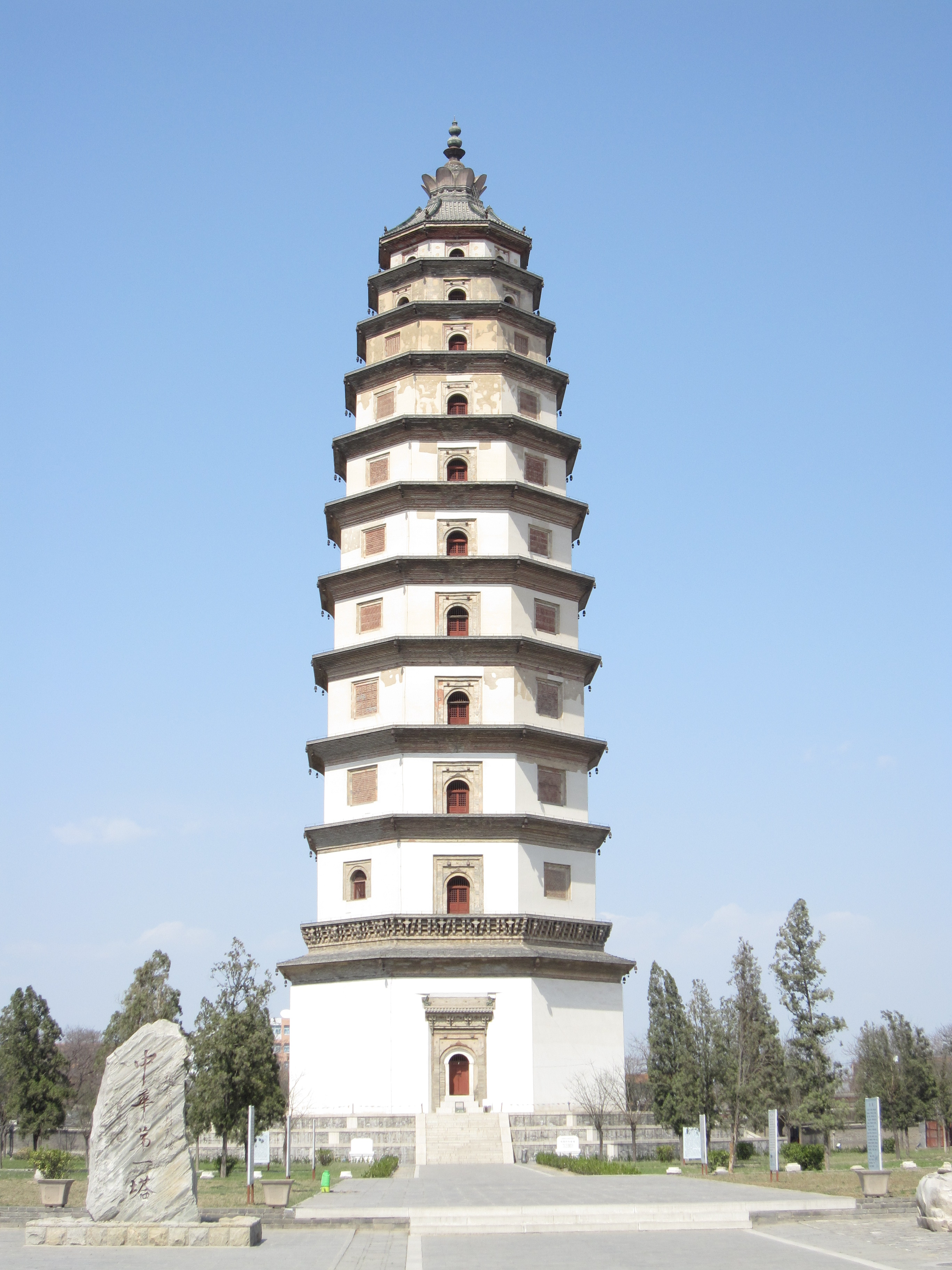
Liaodi Pagoda

The Liaodi Pagoda (Chinese: 料敌塔; pinyin: Liàodí Tǎ) of Kaiyuan Monastery, Dingzhou, Hebei Province, China is the tallest existing pre-modern Chinese pagoda and tallest brick pagoda in the world, built in the 11th century during the Song dynasty (960–1279 CE). The pagoda stands at a height of 84 meters (276 ft), resting on a large platform with an octagonal base. Upon completion in 1055, the Liaodi Pagoda surpassed the height of China's previously tallest pagoda still standing, the central pagoda of the Three Pagodas, which stands at 69.13 m (230 ft). The tallest pagoda in pre-modern Chinese history was a 100-meter (330 ft)-tall wooden pagoda tower in Chang'an built in 611 by Emperor Yang of Sui, yet this structure no longer stands. The Liaodi Pagoda is considered one of the Four Treasures of Hebei.

== History ==
Construction on this stone and brick pagoda began in the year 1001 AD during the reign of Emperor Zhenzong of Song, and was completed in 1055 AD during the reign of Emperor Renzong of Song. Emperor Zhenzong intended to have Buddhist scriptures gathered by the Chinese monk Huineng from India stored at the pagoda's site. Due to its location at a strategic military location, the height of the pagoda made it useful as a watchtower, which could be used to spot enemy movements coming from the northern Liao dynasty headed by the Song's Khitan rivals. Initially, the pagoda was called the Kaiyuan Pagoda, but as a result of its military use it became known as the 'Liaodi' pagoda, literally meaning 'foreseeing the enemy's intentions.'

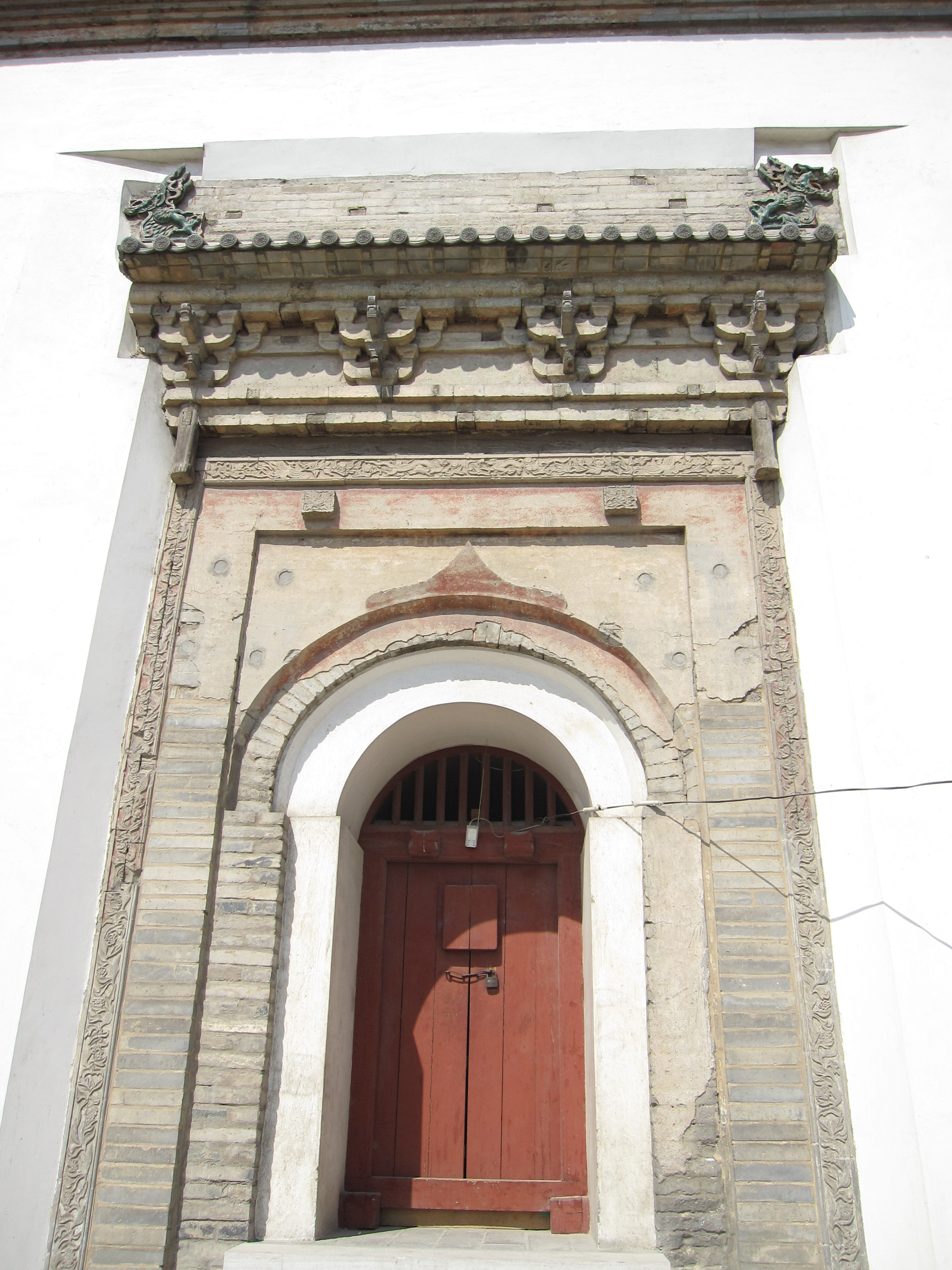
A closeup of a door at the Liaodi Pagoda of Kaiyuan Temple in Dingzhou, China.

Another pagoda of similar height and design is the Chongwen Pagoda of Shaanxi Province. Completed in 1605 during the Ming dynasty, the Chongwen Pagoda stands at a height of 79 m (259 ft), making it the second tallest pagoda built in pre-modern China.

== Features ==
Each floor of the Liaodi Pagoda features gradually-tiered stone eaves, doors and windows (with false windows on four sides of the octagonal structure) while the first floor has an encircling balcony. A split section of the pagoda's walls are open so that the tower's interior may be viewed, along with the actual thickness of the walls. At the top of its steeple, the pagoda features a crowning spire made of bronze and iron. In the interior, a large staircase with landings for each floor winds from the bottom all the way up to the top floor. Brick brackets are used to support the landings on each floor, while from the eighth story up there are no brackets supporting the vaulted ceiling. Within the pagoda is a large pillar in the shape of another pagoda, as seen from the inside and as viewed from the cut section. The painted murals and stone steles with Chinese calligraphy in the pagoda are dated to the Song period when the pagoda was built.

== See also ==
- Chinese architecture
- Architecture of the Song dynasty
- History of architecture
- List of tallest structures built before the 20th century
- Porcelain Tower of Nanjing, a now destroyed pagoda that was 260 ft tall
- Tianning Temple (Changzhou), contains China's largest pagoda, albeit modern (completed in 2007)
