= Huijiquzhengfu station =

Metro station in Zhengzhou, China

Huijiquzhengfu 惠济区政府
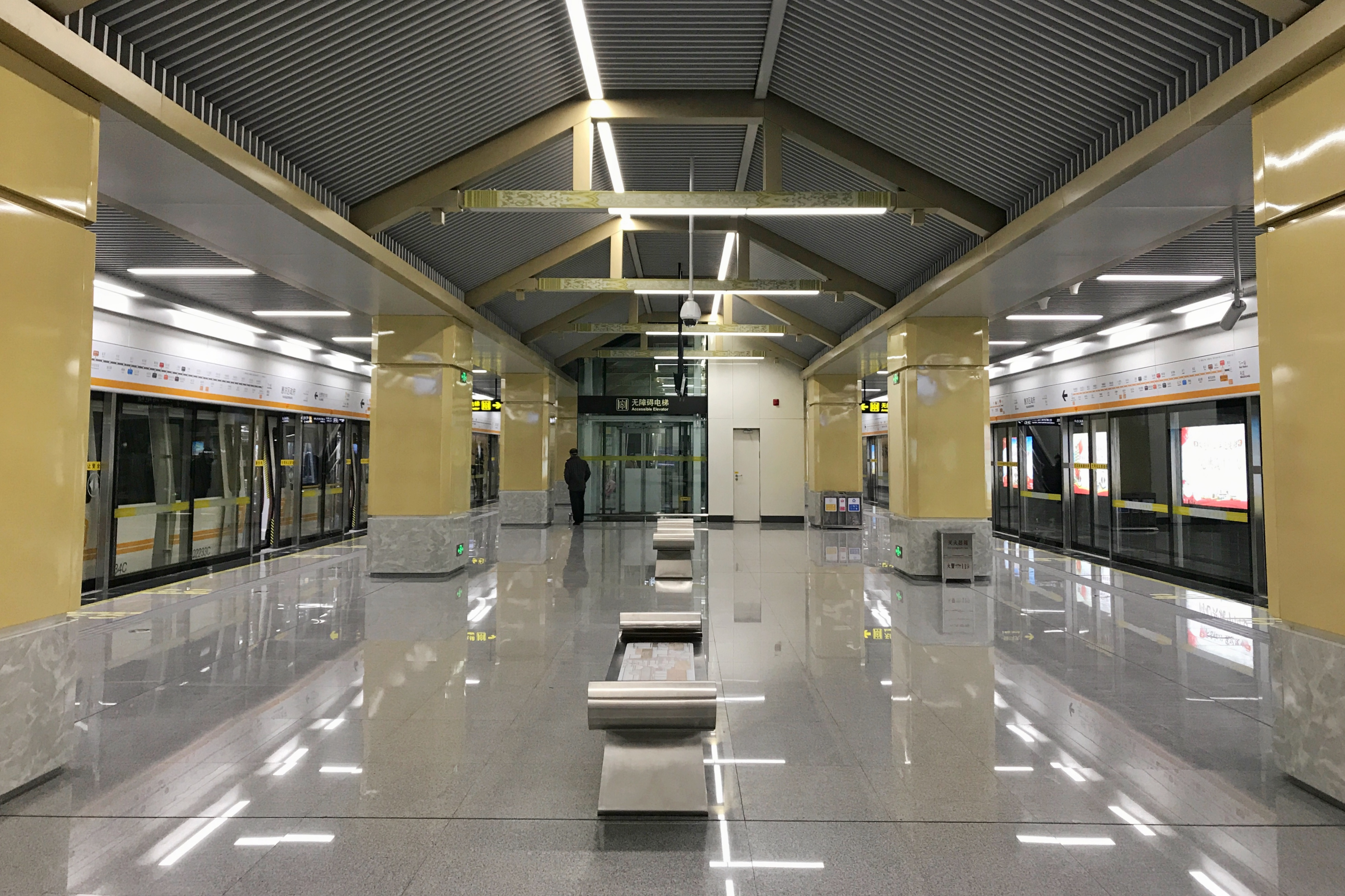

General information
- Location: Intersection of Kaiyuan Road and Tianhe Road; Huiji District, Zhengzhou; China
- Coordinates: 34.8671°N 113.6067°E
- System: Zhengzhou Metro rapid transit station
- Operator: Zhengzhou Metro
- Line: Line 2
- Platforms: 2 (1 island platform)
- Bus routes: Yijiangnan Route 1, Route 92, Zhengzhou BRT Route B52, G78

Construction
- Structure type: Underground

History
- Opened: 28 December 2019

Services
Preceding station	Zhengzhou Metro	Following station
Jiahe Terminus	Line 2	Maozhuang towards Zhengzhou Hangkonggang Railway Station
Location
- Location within Zhengzhou

Huijiquzhengfu (Chinese: 惠济区政府) is a metro station of Zhengzhou Metro Line 2. The station opened on 28 December 2019, together with the Phase II of Line 2.

== Station layout ==
Huijiquzhengfu station currently serves Line 2. The main station structure is located underground on the western side of the intersection of Kaiyuan Road and Tianhe Road, oriented east-west along Kaiyuan Road.

The main structural works for a Line 3 interchange were also constructed beneath Tianhe Road. However, as the Line 3 northern extension remains under the initial stages of planning, these facilities have not been open to the public.

1F	Ground	Exits
B1F	Concourse	Customer service centre, ticket machines, security check, ticket gates, station control room
B2F	Equipment level	Station equipment
B3F		← Line 2 towards Jiahe (Terminus)
B3F	Island platform, doors will open on the left
B3F		Line 2 towards Nansihuan (Maozhuang) →

=== Main concourse and facilities ===
The main station concourse is located on level B1, and includes a customer service centre, ticket machines, and security screening facilities. Paid and unpaid areas are separated by fare gates and railings. This station is fully accessible, with barrier-free elevators, escalators and stairs.

There is a nursing room located near the passageway close to Exit E.

=== Entrances and exits ===
Exit	Location	Connecting transport
	Kaiyuan Road (S)	Zhengzhou Bus Kaiyuan Road/Tianhe Road: Route / Destinations / Notes; B52 / Tianshan Road → Nongke Road/Jingsan Road; Yijiangnan 1 / Yijiangnan (Zhongyuan Film City) → Yincai Street/Wenhua Road; 91 / Zhengzhou Railway Station Beigangwan → Maozhuang
	Kaiyuan Road (N)	Zhengzhou Bus Kaiyuan Road/Tianhe Road: Route / Destinations / Notes; Yijiangnan 1 / Yijiangnan (Zhongyuan Film City) → Yincai Street/Wenhua Road
	Tianhe Road	Zhengzhou Bus Tianhe Road/Kaiyuan Road: Route / Destinations / Notes; G78 / Senlinhu → Hanghai Road/Jinse Gangwan
Note： Exit has an accessible elevator | Exit has a restroom

== Station architecture ==
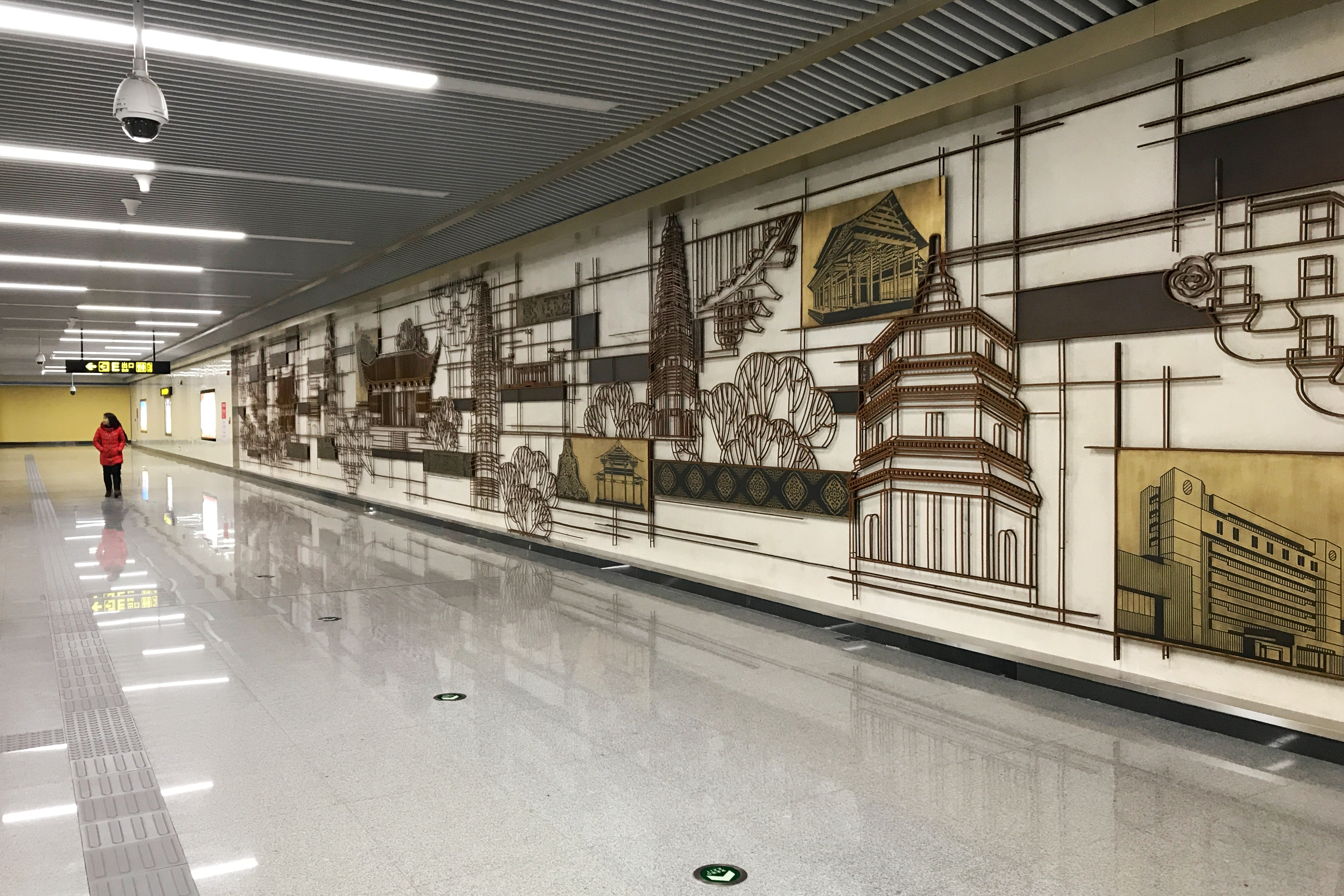
'Hongtu Huagou'

The station, like many others built as part of Phase II of Line 2, adopts a traditional Chinese theme. Its ceiling design incorporates elements inspired by chuíhuā zhù (垂花柱), a decorative feature of traditional Chinese architecture.

The main concourse features a cultural wall named "Hongtu Huagou", which depicts surviving Song dynasty landmarks in Henan, such as the Po and Iron Pagodas. It references Yingzao Fashi, a Song dynasty architectural treatise by Li Jie, as well as scenery from the nearby Gushuyuan ('Ancient Tree Garden').

== See also ==
- Zhengzhou Metro
- Zhengzhou
- Huiji District
- Urban rail transit in China
- List of Zhengzhou Metro stations
