= Maozhuang station =

Metro station in Zhengzhou, China

Maozhuang 毛庄
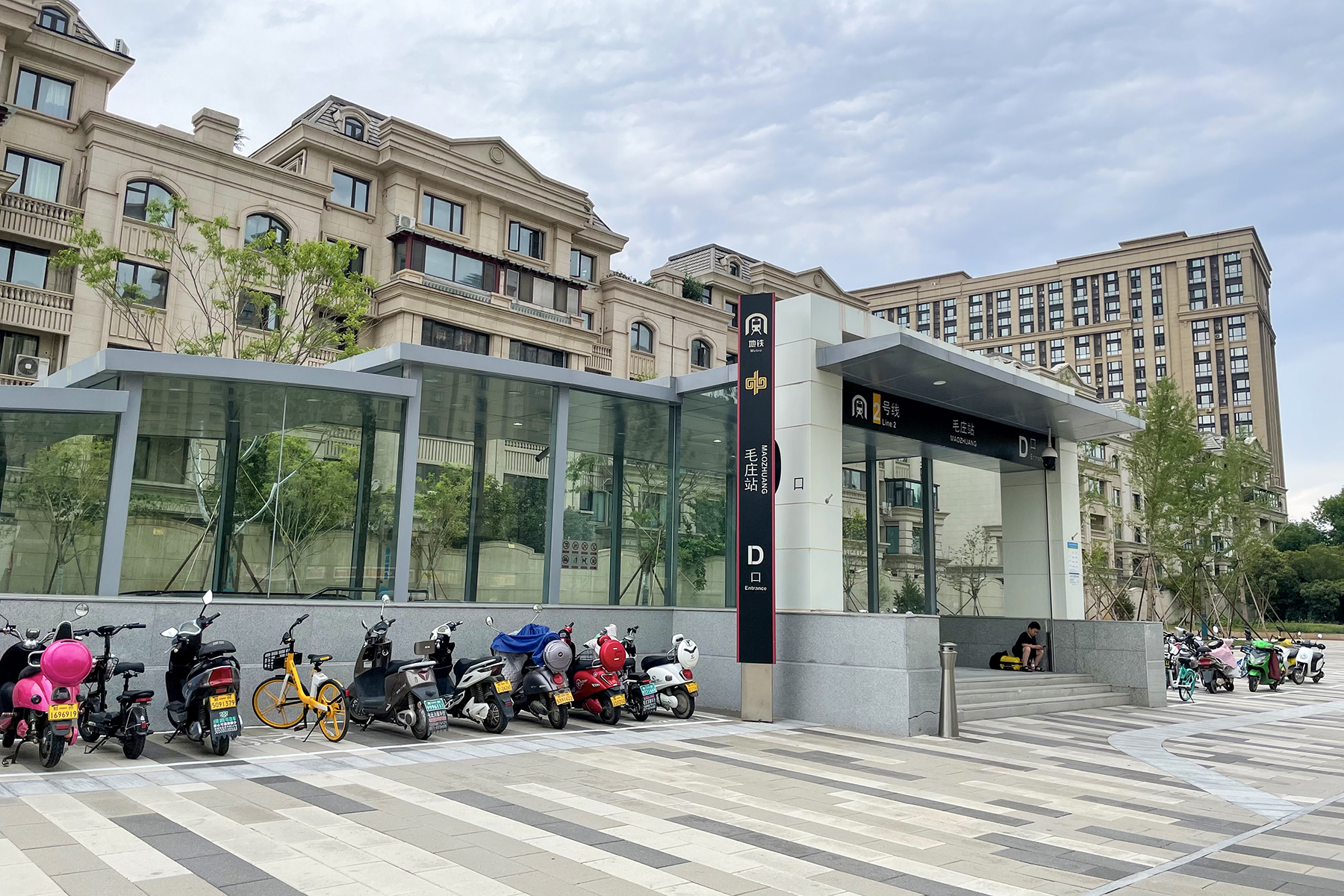

General information
- Location: Intersection of Kaiyuan Road and Jinbei North Road; Huiji District, Zhengzhou; China
- Coordinates: 34.867619°N 113.6202°E
- System: Zhengzhou Metro rapid transit station
- Operator: Zhengzhou Metro
- Line: Line 2
- Platforms: 2 (1 island platform)
- Bus routes: Zhengzhou BRT Route B52, 723, Yijiangnan Route 1, Y26, S183, S156, S191

Construction
- Structure type: Underground

Other information
- Station code: 0217

History
- Opened: 28 December 2019

Services
Preceding station	Zhengzhou Metro	Following station
Huijiquzhengfu towards Jiahe	Line 2	Huanghe Yingbinguan towards Zhengzhou Hangkonggang Railway Station
Location
- Location within Zhengzhou

Maozhuang (Chinese: 毛庄) is a metro station of Zhengzhou Metro Line 2, located at the intersection of Kaiyuan Road and Jinbei North Road in Huiji District, Zhengzhou. The station opened on 28 December 2019.

During construction, the station was known as Jinhe Road (Chinese: 金河路), with the final station name, Maozhuang, being formally adopted on 27 September 2019.

== Station history ==
In early 2014, the National Development and Reform Commission of the People's Republic of China approved the Zhengzhou Urban Rail Transit Near-Term Construction Plan (2014-2020), with the second phase of Line 2 being approved for construction.

A station was planned on the intersection of Kaiyuan Road and Guocheng Road, with the latter being renamed to Jinbei North Road.

Construction of JInhe Road station began on 6 December 2016, with the first section of the station being concreted on 27 July 2017.

== Station layout ==
Maozhuang station currently serves Line 2, opening as part of the Phase II extension. The main station structure is oriented in an east-west direction along Kaiyuan Road, with a two-story underground station.

1F	Ground	Exits
B1F	Concourse	Customer service centre, ticket machines, security check, ticket gates, station control room
B2F		← Line 2 towards Jiahe (Huijizhengfuqu)
B2F	Island platform, doors will open on the left
B2F		Line 2 towards Nansihuan/Chengjiao line through services to Zhengzhou Hangkonggang railway station (Huanghe Yingbinguan) →

=== Main concourse and facilities ===
The main station concourse is located on level B1, and includes a customer service centre, ticket machines, and security screening facilities. Paid and unpaid areas are separated by fare gates and railings. This station is fully accessible, with barrier-free elevators, escalators and stairs.

There is a nursing room located near Exit C.

=== Entrances and exits ===
Exit	Location	Connecting transport
	Kaiyuan Road（S）	Zhengzhou Bus Kaiyuan Road/Jinbei North Road: Route / Destinations / Notes; 723 / Heyuzhou → Wenhua Road/Yingcai Street; Yijiangnan 1 / Yijiangnan (Zhongyuan Film City) → Yincai Street/Wenhua Road; B52 / Tianshan Road → Nongke Road/Jingsan Road; Y26 / Maozhuang Vegetable Wholesale Market → Huayuan Road/Liuzhuang
	Kaiyuan Road (S)	Zhengzhou Bus： Jinbei Road/Kaiyuan Road: Route / Destinations / Notes; S183 / Chaoxing Road/Changliu Road → Dongzhao; S156 / Huayuan Road/Sanquan Road → Xingyun Road
	Kaiyuan Road (N)	Zhengzhou Bus Kaiyuan Road/Jinbei North Road: Route / Destinations / Notes; 723 / Heyuzhou → Wenhua Road/Yingcai Street; B52 / Tianshan Road → Nongke Road/Jingsan Road; Yijiangnan 1 / Yijiangnan (Zhongyuan Film City) → Yincai Street/Wenhua Road
	Kaiyuan Road (N)	Zhengzhou Bus Kaiyuan Road/Jinbei North Road: Route / Destinations / Notes; S191 / Jinbei Road/Kaiyuan Road → Huayuankou Village; S156 / Huayuan Road/Sanquan Road → Xingyun Road; S183 / Chaoxing Road/Changliu Road → Dongzhao; Y26 / Maozhuang Vegetable Wholesale Market → Huayuan Road/Liuzhuang
Note： Exit has an accessible elevator | Exit has a restroom

== See also ==
- Line 2 (Zhengzhou Metro)
- Zhengzhou
- Huiji District
- Urban rail transit in China
- List of Zhengzhou Metro stations
