= Ancient Chinese wooden architecture =

Style of Chinese architecture

Chinese traditional architectural craftsmanship for timber-framed structures
- UNESCO Intangible Cultural Heritage
- Country: China
- Reference: 223

Inscription history
- Inscription: 2009
- UNESCO Cultural Heritage

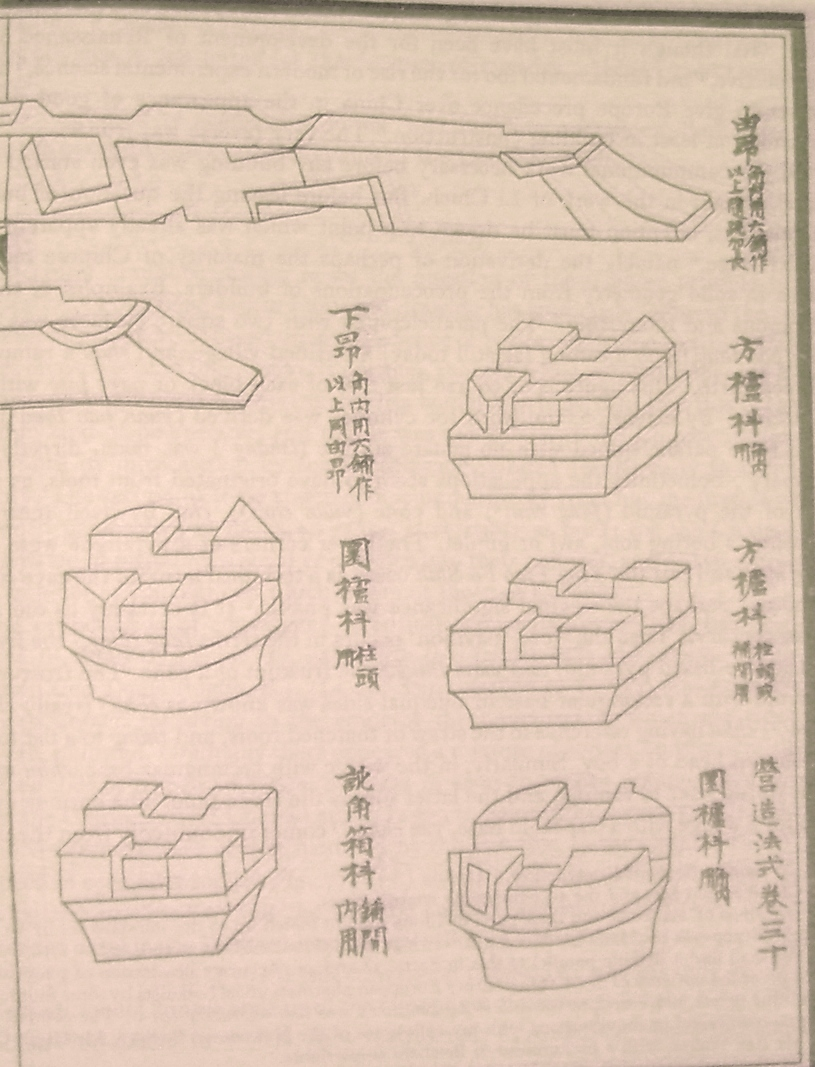
Diagram of bracket and cantilever arms from the building manual Yingzao Fashi (published in 1103) of the Song dynasty

Ancient Chinese wooden architecture is a style of Chinese architecture. In the West it has been studied less than other architectural styles. Although Chinese architectural history reaches far back in time, descriptions of Chinese architecture are often confined to the well known Forbidden City with little else explored by the West. Although common features of Chinese architecture have been unified into a vocabulary illustrating uniquely Chinese forms and methods, until recently data has not been available. Because of the lack of knowledge of the roots of Chinese architecture, the descriptions of its elements are often translated into Western terms and architectural theory, losing their unique Chinese meanings. A cause of this deficiency is that the two most important Chinese government architecture manuals, the Song dynasty Yingzao Fashi and Qing Architecture Standards have never been translated into any Western language.

== Historical records ==
Ancient Chinese architecture has numerous similar elements in part, because of the early Chinese method of standardizing and prescribing uniform features of structures. The standards are recorded in bureaucratic manuals and drawings that were passed down through generations and dynasties. These account for the similar architectural features persisting over thousands of years, starting with the earliest evidence of Chinese imperial urbanism, now available through excavations starting in the early 1980s. The plans include, for example, two-dimensional architectural drawings as early as the first millennium AD, and explain the strong tendency for the shared architectural features in Chinese architecture, that evolved through a complicated but unified evolutionary process over the millennia. Generations of builders and craftsmen recorded their work and the collectors who collated the information into building standards (for example Yingzao Fashi) and Qing Architecture Standards were widely available, in fact strictly mandated, and passed down. The recording of architectural practice and details facilitated a transmission throughout the subsequent generations of the unique system of construction that became a body of unique architectural characteristics.

More recently, the dependence on text for archaeological descriptions has yielded to the realization that archaeological excavations by the People's Republic of China provides better evidence of Chinese daily life and ceremonies from the Neolithic times to the more recent centuries. For example, the excavation of tombs has provided evidence to produce facsimiles of wooden building parts and yielded site plans several thousand years old. The recent excavation of the Prehistoric Beifudi site is an example.

Three components make up the foundation of ancient Chinese architecture: the foundation platform, the timber frame, and the decorative roof. In addition, the most fundamental feature is a four-sided rectangular enclosure, that is, structures with walls that are formed at right angles and oriented cardinally. The traditional Chinese belief in a square-shaped universe with the four world quarters is manifested physically in its architecture.

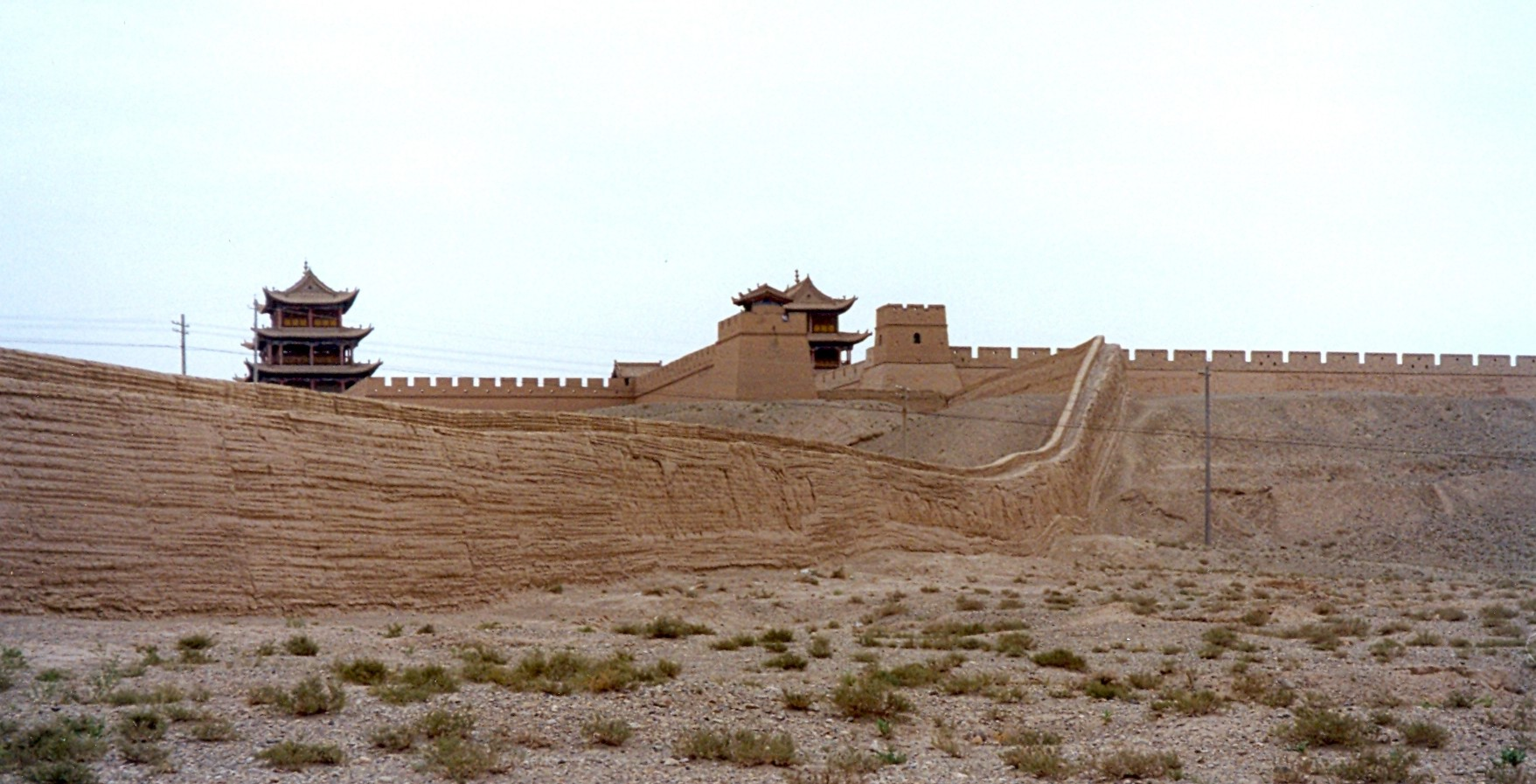
Rammed earth sections of the Great Wall of China

== Structural features ==
=== Foundation platform ===
By the middle Neolithic period, the use of rammed earth and unbaked mud bricks was prevalent. Hangtu (loess), the pounding of layers of earth to make walls, altars, and foundations remained an element of Chinese construction for the next several millennia. The Great Wall of China, built of Hangtu, was erected beginning in the first millennium BC. Sundried mud bricks and rammed mud walls were typically constructed within wood frames. Hard pounded earth floors were strengthened by heating.

=== Timber frame ===
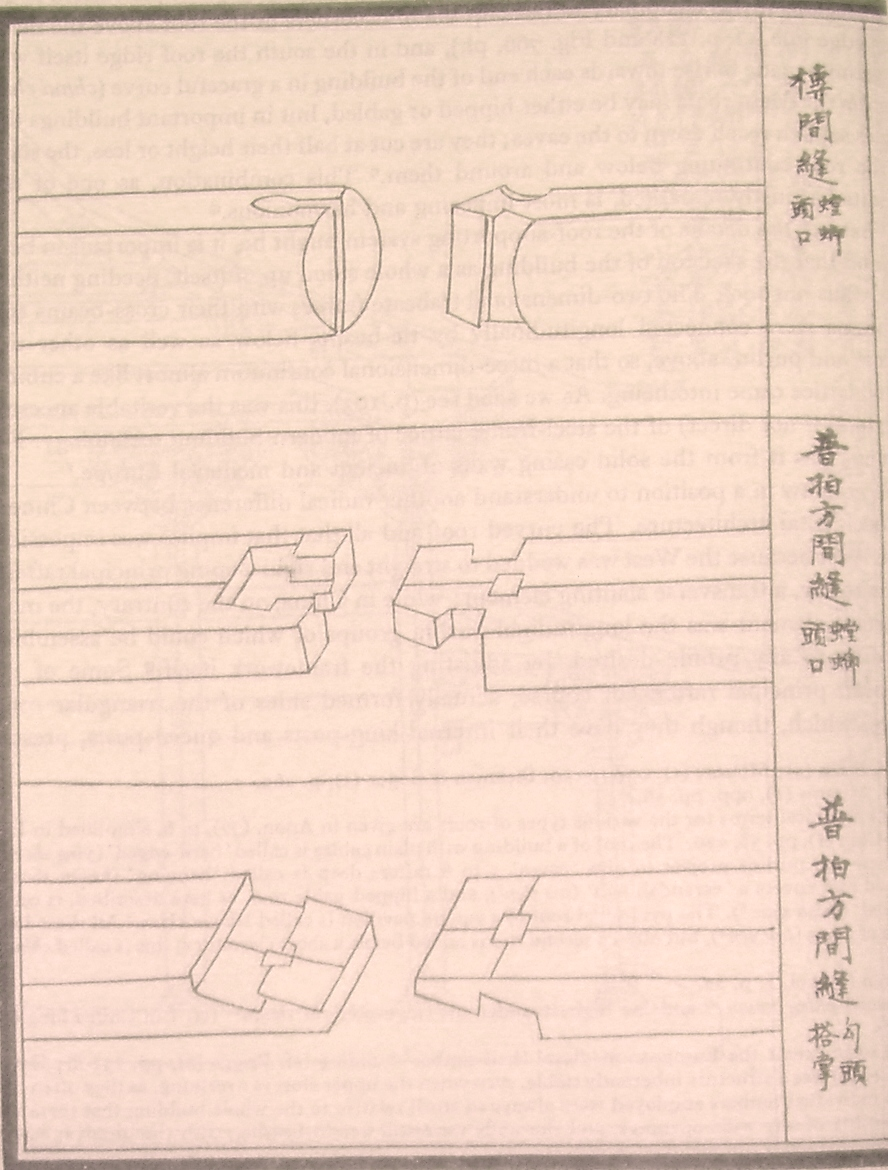
Sliding dovetail, lap dovetail and stepped bevel splice joints of tie beams and cross beams from the Yingzao Fashi, published in 1103 by the Song dynasty Chinese scholar-bureaucrat Li Jie (1065–1110).

A fundamental achievement of Chinese wooden architecture is the load-bearing timber frame, a network of interlocking wooden supports forming the skeleton of the building. This is considered China's major contribution to worldwide architectural technology. However, it is not known how the builders got the huge wooden support columns into position.

Unlike western architecture, in ancient Chinese wooden architecture, the wall only defined an enclosure, and did not form a load-bearing element. Buildings in China have been supported by wooden frames for as long as seven millennia. The emergence of the characteristic articulated wooden Chinese frame emerged during the Neolithic period. Seven thousand years ago mortise and tenon joinery was used to build wood-framed houses. (The oldest are at Hemudu site at Zhejiang). Over a thousand of these sites have been identified, usually with circular, square or oblong shaped buildings. During the Yangshao culture in the Middle Neolithic, circular and rectangular semisubterranean structures are found with wooden beams and columns. Wooden beams or earth supported the roofs which were most likely thatched. As the villages and towns grew they adhered to symmetrical shapes. Symmetry was also important in the layout of homes, altars, and villages.

Dougong is a unique structural element of interlocking wooden brackets, one of the most important elements in traditional Chinese architecture. It first appeared in buildings of the last centuries BC and evolved into a structural network that joined pillars and columns to the frame of the roof. Dougong was widely used in the Spring and Autumn period (770–476 BC) and developed into a complex set of interlocking parts by its peak in the Tang and Song periods. Since ancient times when the Chinese first began to use wood for building, joinery has been a major focus and craftsmen cut the wooden pieces to fit so perfectly that no glue or fasteners were necessary.

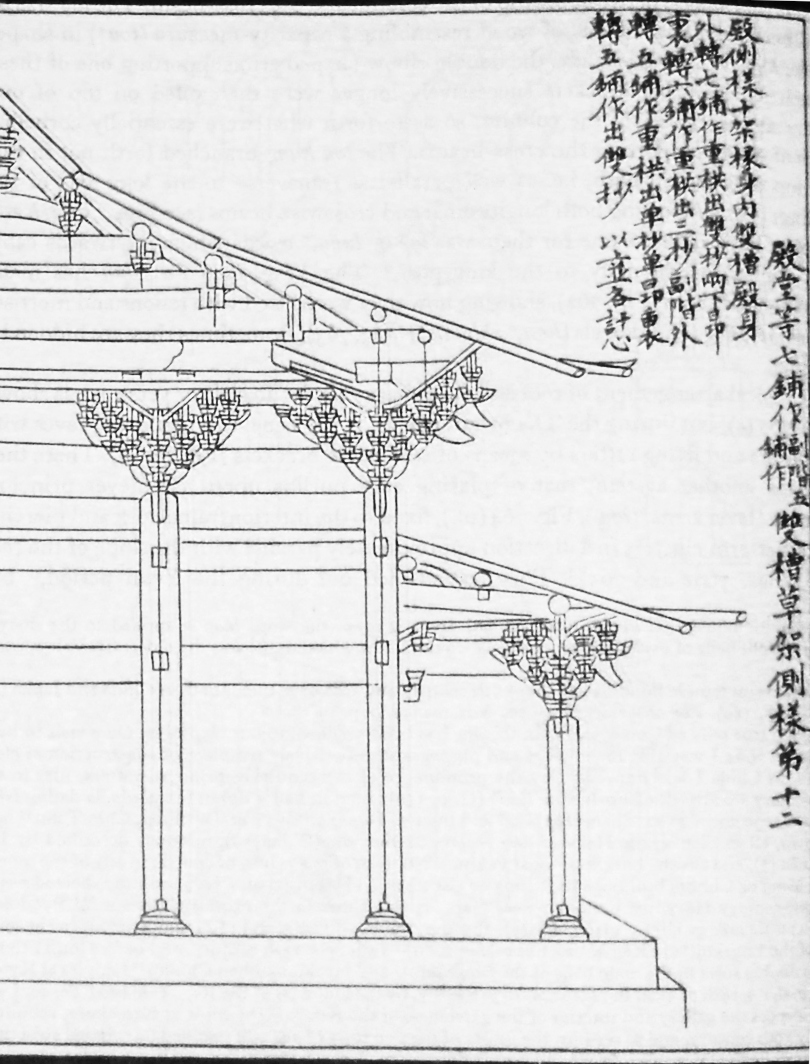
Diagram of three corbel wood bracket sets ("Dougong") from the building manual Yingzao Fashi

=== Roof and ceiling ===
In traditional Chinese architecture, every facet of a building was decorated using various materials and techniques. Simple ceiling ornamentations in ordinary buildings were made of wooden strips and covered with paper. More decorative was the lattice ceiling, constructed of woven wooden strips or sorghum stems fastened to the beams. Because of the intricacy of its ornamentation, elaborate cupolas were reserved for the ceilings of the most important structures, such as tombs and altars, although it is not clear what the spiritual beliefs of the early Chinese were, as altars appear to have served as burial sites. In traditional Chinese architecture, the layered pieces of the ceiling are held together by interlocking bracket sets (斗拱 dǒugǒng).

Elaborate wooden coffers (藻井 zǎojǐng) bordered by a round, square, or polygon frame with its brackets projecting inward and upward from its base were used around the 7th century. Deeply recessed panels shaped like a well (square at the base with a rounded top) were fitted into the ceiling's wooden framework. The center panel of the ceiling was decorated with water lilies or other water plants. The relationship of the name to water has been linked to an ancient fear that wooden buildings would be destroyed by fire and that water from the zǎojǐng would prevent or quell the fire's flames.

The tomb of Empress Dowager Wenming of the Northern Wei dynasty has a coffer in the flat-topped, vaulted ceiling in the back chamber of her tomb. The Baoguo Temple in Yuyao in Zhejiang has three cupolas in the ceiling, making it unique among surviving examples of Song architecture.

Sanqing Hall (Hall of the Three Purities) is the only Yuan-period structure with three cupolas in its ceiling.

== Notes ==
- Chinese Architecture
- Chinese Imperial Planning. Honolulu: University of Hawaii Press
- Chinese Architecture—The Origins of Chinese
- Chinese Architecture—The Three Kingdoms, Western and Eastern Jin, and Northern and Southern Dynasties.
- Chinese Architecture—The Lia, Song, Xi Xia, and Jin Dynasties
