= Huayuankou, Henan =

Huayuankou 花园口
- Town
- 花园口镇
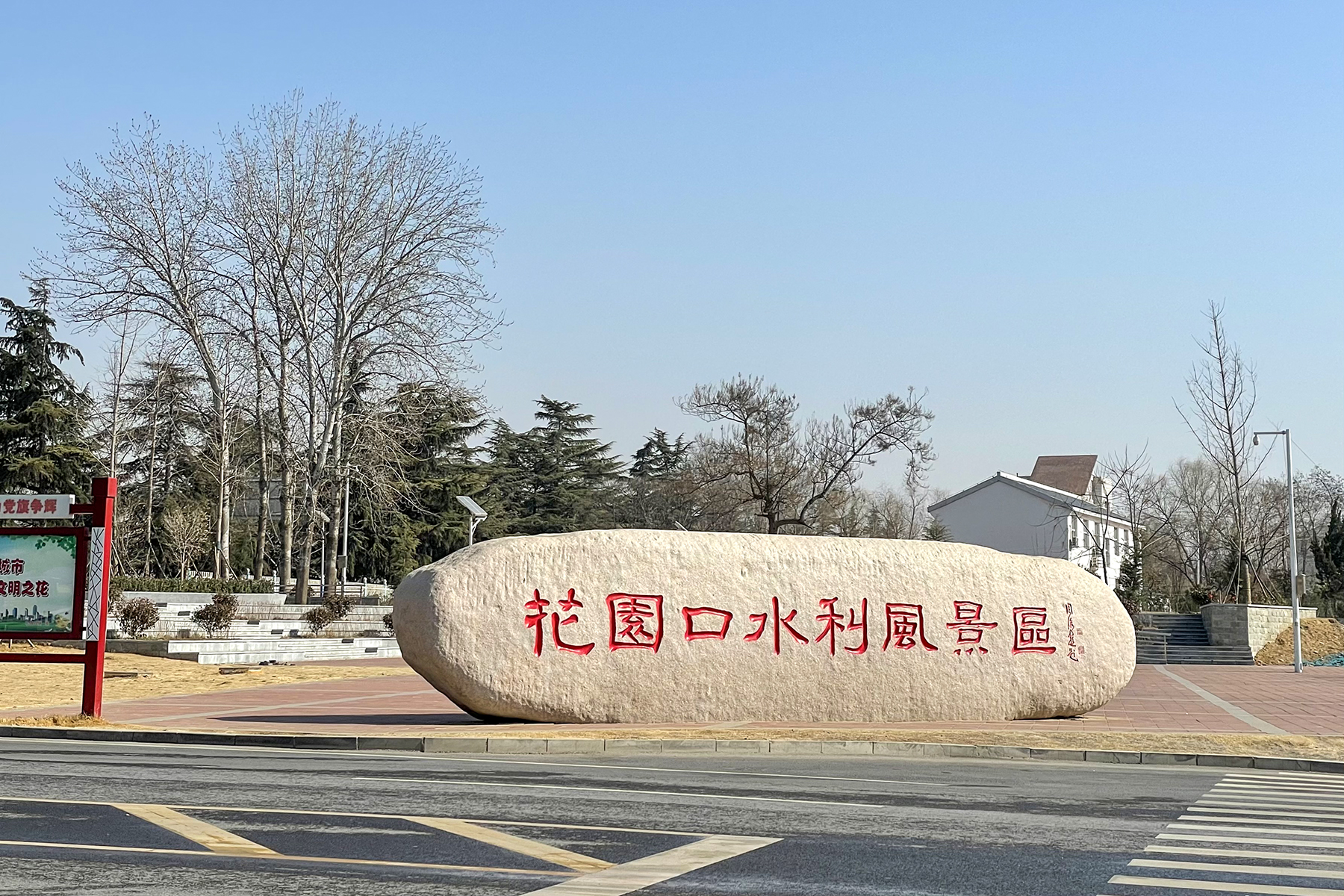
- Huayuankou Water Conservancy Scenic Area

- Location within Henan Location within China
- Coordinates: 34°52′37″N 113°40′22″E
- Country: China
- Province: Henan
- Prefecture-level city: Zhengzhou
- District: Huiji

Area
  - Total: 39 km^{2} (15 sq mi)

Population
  - Total: 15,000
  - Density: 380/km^{2} (1,000/sq mi)
- Time zone: UTC+8 (China Standard)
- Postal code: 450053
- Area code: 0371

Huayuankou (simplified Chinese: 花园口; traditional Chinese: 花園口; pinyin: Huāyúankǒu) is a town in Huiji District, used to be a ferry of the Yellow River in Zhengzhou, Henan, China.

It has an area of 39 square kilometers and a population of 15,000. Its name literally means "Garden ferry". As of 2018, it has 8 villages under its administration.

== 1938 Yellow River flood ==
In June 1938, during the Second Sino-Japanese War, the Nationalist troops under Chiang Kai-shek intentionally broke the levees of the Yellow River near Huayuankou to slow the advance of the Japanese army. Although several thousand Japanese troops were drowned, 12 million Chinese were affected, nearly 900,000 of them dying. Chiang was slow to provide disaster relief.

=== Reason for breaching the dike ===
As the Japanese had been reported to have taken the city of Kaifeng, many of the dikes near Zhengzhou were along the path the Japanese would take if they wanted to capture the city of Wuhan. This was the triggering idea for the Nationalist troops as they pictured the Yellow River being a military tool to stop the advancement of the Japanese. The plan of attack by Chiang and his subordinates was to breach the dikes that withheld the mass amount of water from pouring into the 500-square mile area of central China. However while this long-term idea was in full swing, Chiang's dilemma stood behind the thought of the many lives that stood past the dikes. This dilemma was thought of in two ways, the first being if he were to breach the dikes then he would be spreading death, wiping hundreds of thousands of people. The other thought was if he didn't break the dikes then Wuhan would collapse within days. In all a decision was needed quickly and eventually was made as Chiang gave the orders to General Wei Rulin to blow up a dike holding the Yellow River near Henan. As this order was put in place the first few attempts stood no match for the army between June 4 and 6 1938 as the structure was too durable. While the attempts failed left and right, "hour by hour, the Japanese were moving closer".
