= Laoyachen Subdistrict =

Laoyachen 老鸦陈
- Subdistrict

Chinese transcription(s)
  - Characters: 老鸦陈
  - Pinyin: Lǎoyāchén
- Location within Henan Location within China
- Coordinates: 34°49′43.98″N 113°37′11.16″E
- Country: China
- Province: Henan
- Prefecture: Zhengzhou
- District: Huiji

Area
  - Total: 16.75 km^{2} (6.47 sq mi)

Population
  - Total: 18,735
  - Density: 1,119/km^{2} (2,897/sq mi)
- Time zone: UTC+8 (China Standard)
- Postal code: 450053
- Area code: 0371

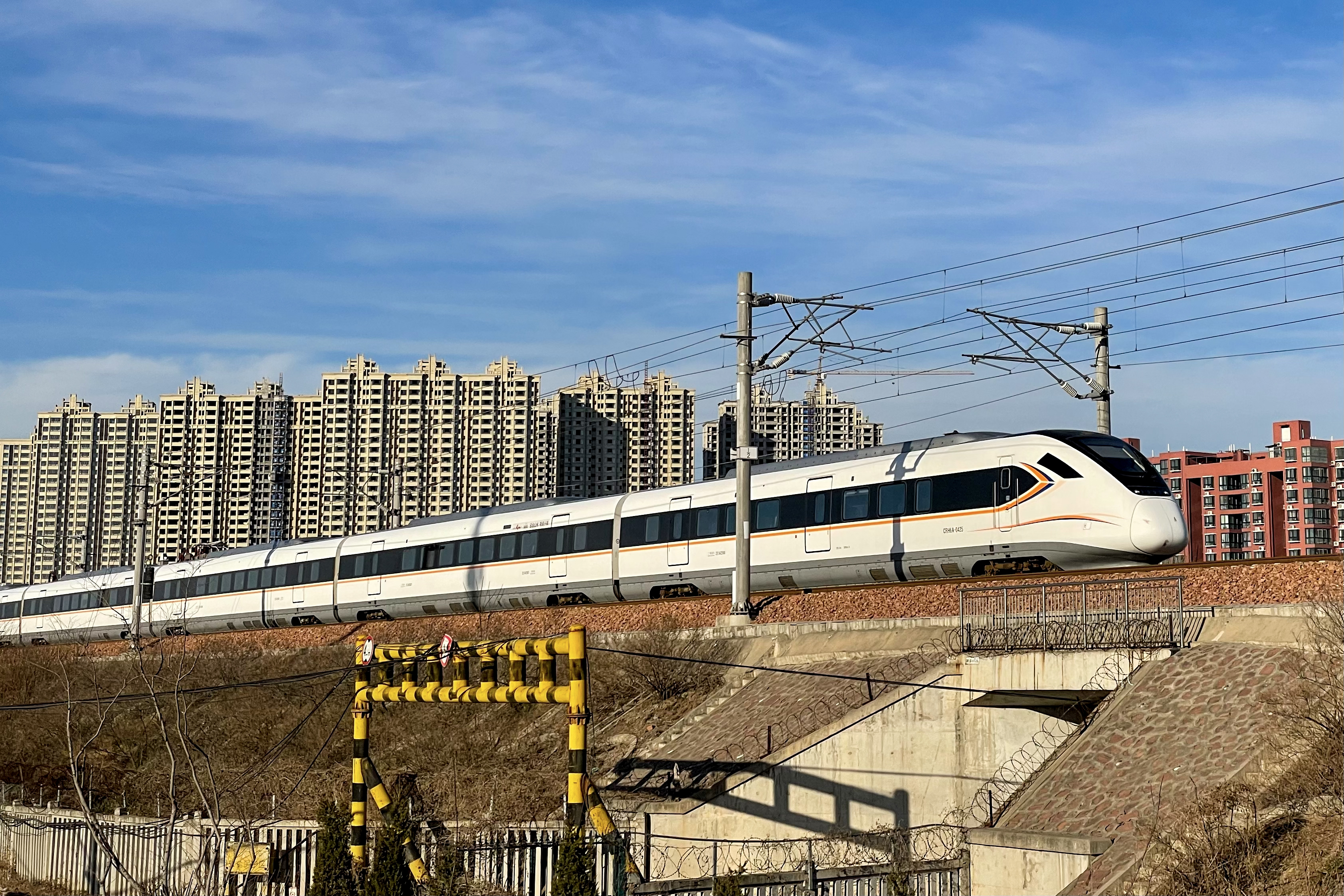
Train heading towards Nanyangzhai

Laoyachen (Chinese: 老鸦陈; pinyin: Lǎoyāchén) is a subdistrict, formerly town, of Huiji District in Zhengzhou, Henan, China.

It has an area of 16.75 square kilometers and a population of 18,735.

Demolition of Laoyachen Village, Zhengzhou's largest, began in December 2013, as part of the city's massive urban renewal program. According to a resident, households that relocated voluntarily before then were not given new homes, but "were promised 7,200 yuan (US$1,096) annually paid to each family member over the following three years on top of an additional annual 5,000 yuan (US$761) in living expenses." Protests by residents unwilling to move on those terms disrupted demolition into 2015. Local authorities eventually revised their compensation offer. As of September 2017, one of the few buildings still standing in the village is Laoyachen Central Primary School, which will be preserved and built around.
