= Li Jie (Song dynasty) =

Chinese architect and writer (1065–1110)

Li Jie (李誡; 1065–1110) was an ancient Chinese architect and writer of the Northern Song dynasty. He wrote the Yingzao Fashi, a technical treatise on architecture and craftsmanship.
