= Huiji, Zhengzhou =

Huiji 惠济区
- District
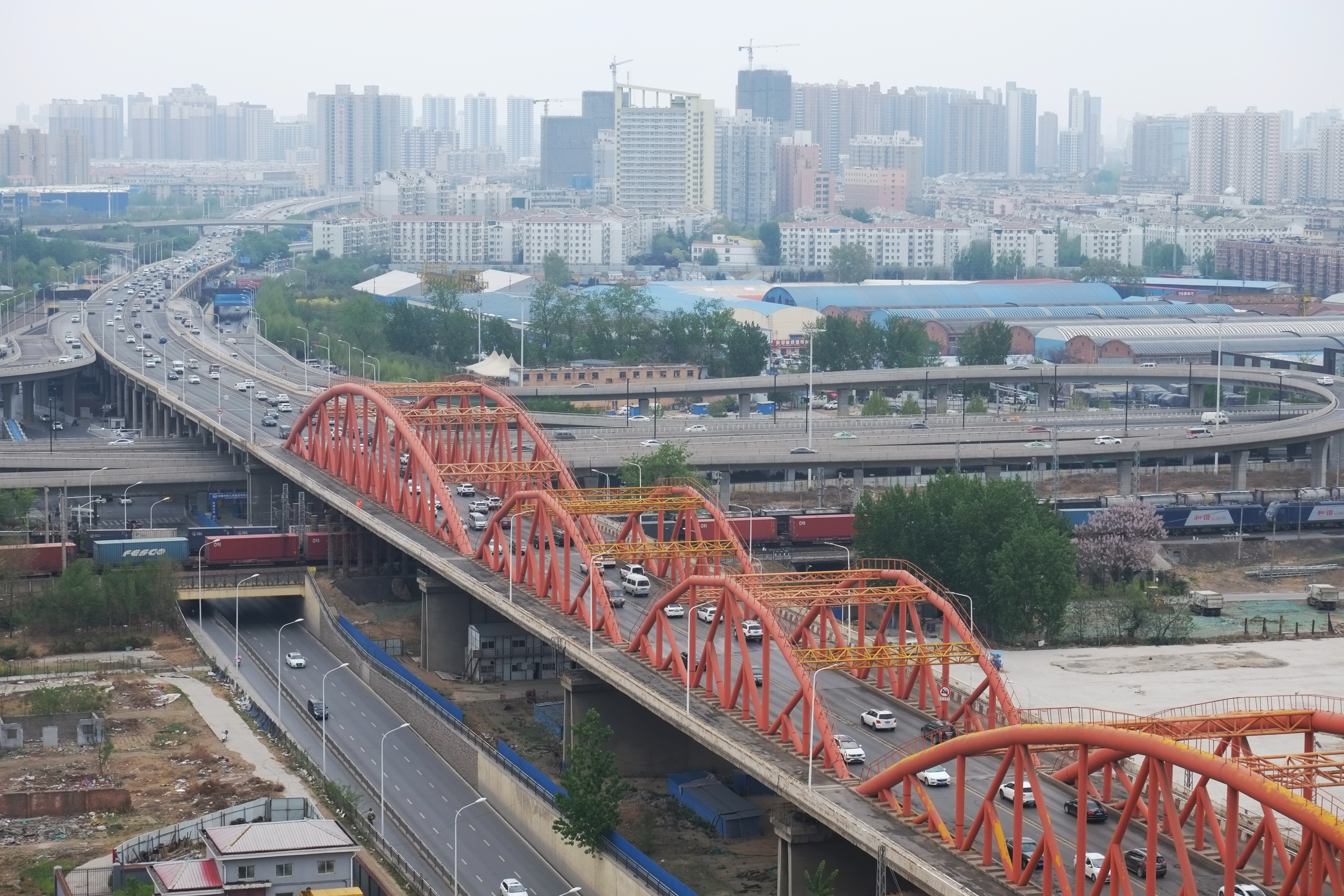

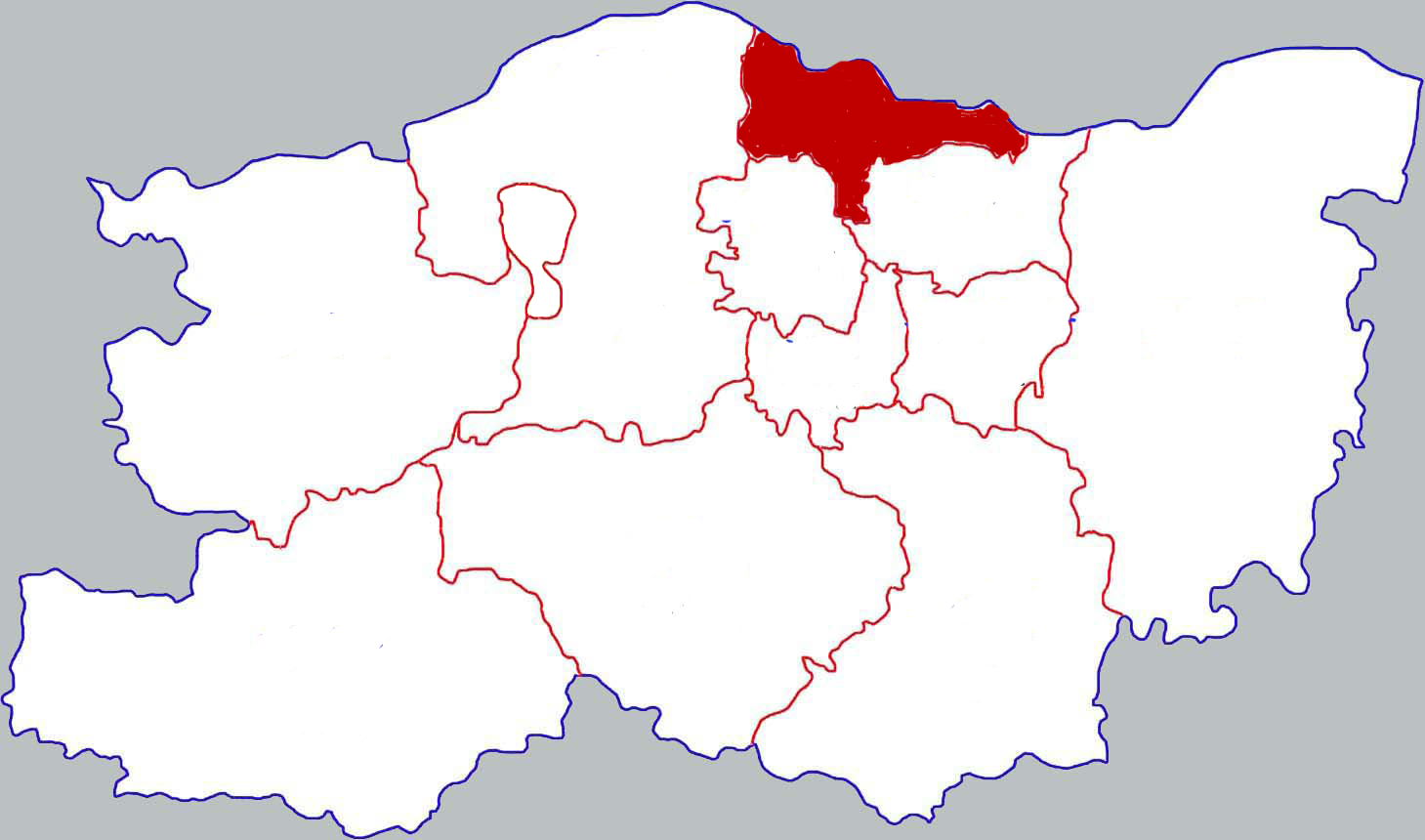
- Location in Zhengzhou

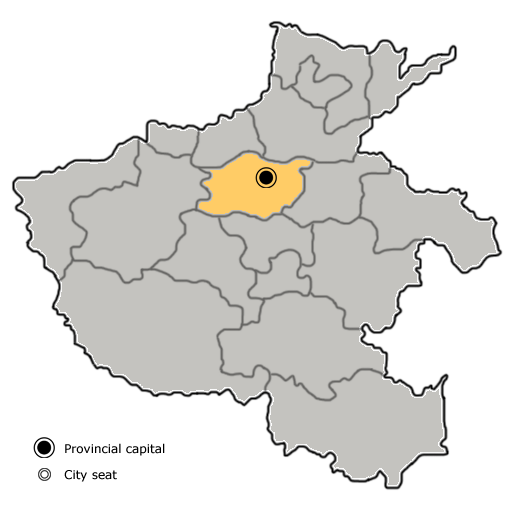
- Zhengzhou in Henan
- Coordinates: 34°51′57.03″N 113°36′46.47″E
- Country: People's Republic of China
- Province: Henan
- Prefecture-level city: Zhengzhou

Area
  - Total: 206 km^{2} (80 sq mi)

Population (2019)
  - Total: 303,500
  - Density: 1,470/km^{2} (3,820/sq mi)
- Time zone: UTC+8 (China Standard)
- Postal code: 450053
- Area code: 0371
- Website: www.huiji.gov.cn

Huiji District (惠济区; Hùijì Qū), previously Mangshan District (邙山区; Mángshān Qū), is one of 6 urban districts of the prefecture-level city of Zhengzhou, the capital of Henan Province, South Central China.

Located south of the Yellow River and north of Zhongyuan and Jinshui, much of Huiji lies outside Zhengzhou's urban area and is overall still an agricultural area, though many upper-class villas and townhouse complex are located here due to its relatively pristine environment. It has an area of and a population of 232.8 km^{2} (89.9 sq mi) and a population of 269,561, making it Zhengzhou's least densely populated district.

There are many tourist attractions located just south of the Yellow River, including Mount Mang, Huayuankou, Fujing Ecological Garden, Dahe village, and the Yellow River Wetland Protected Area, as well as the proposed Zhengzhou Wildlife Park.

== Administrative divisions ==
Huiji has six subdistricts and two towns:

- Subdistricts:
  - Xincheng (新城街道)
  - Liuzhai (刘寨街道)
  - Laoyachen (老鸦陈街道)
  - Changxinglu (长兴路街道)
  - Yingbinlu (迎宾路街道)
  - Dahelu (大河路街道)
- Towns:
  - Guxing (古荥镇)
  - Huayuankou (花园口镇)
