= Yingzao Fashi =

Architecture and craftsmanship written by the ancient Chinese author Li Jie

- Traditional Chinese: 營造法式
- Simplified Chinese: 营造法式
- Literal meaning: "Treatise on Architectural Methods or State Building Standards"
Transcriptions
Standard Mandarin
- Hanyu Pinyin: Yíngzào fǎshì
- IPA: [ǐŋtsâʊ fàŋʂî]

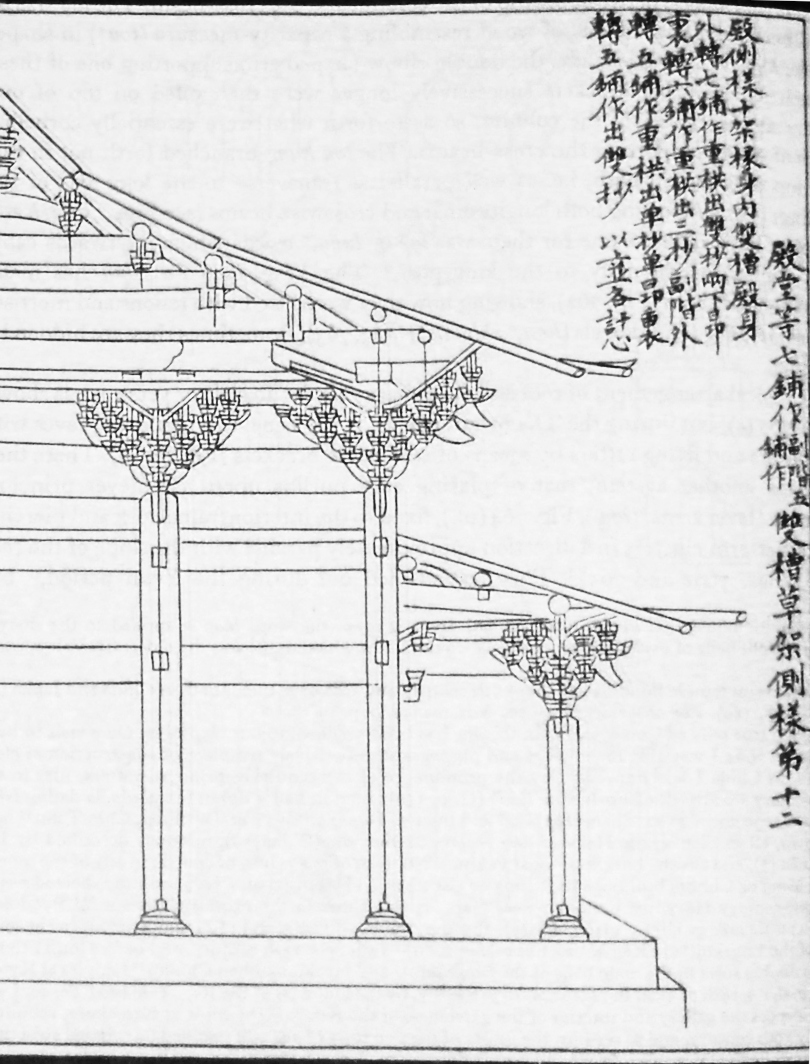
Bracket arm clusters containing cantilevers, Yingzao Fashi

The Yingzao Fashi (Chinese: 營造法式; pinyin: yíngzàofǎshì; lit. 'Treatise on Architectural Methods or State Building Standards') is a technical treatise on architecture and craftsmanship written by the ancient Chinese author Li Jie (李誡; 1065–1110), the Directorate of Buildings and Construction during the mid Song Dynasty of China. He revised many older treatises on architecture from 1097 to 1100. By 1100, he had completed his own architectural work, which he presented to Emperor Zhezong of Song. The emperor's successor, Emperor Huizong of Song, had the book published in 1103 to provide architectural standards for builders, architects, literate craftsmen, and the engineering agencies of the central government. Li Jie was then made the Director of Palace Buildings. Thereafter, Li helped oversee the construction of administrative offices, palace apartments, gates and gate-towers, the ancestral temple of the Song Dynasty, along with numerous Buddhist temples.

In 1145, a second edition of Li's book was published by Wang Huan. Between 1222-1233, a third printing was published. This edition, published in Pingjiang (now Suzhou, Jiangsu), was later handcopied into the Yongle Encyclopedia and Siku Quanshu. In addition, a number of handcopied editions were made for private libraries. One of these handcopies of the Pingjiang edition was rediscovered in 1919 and printed as facsimile in 1920.

== The treatise ==
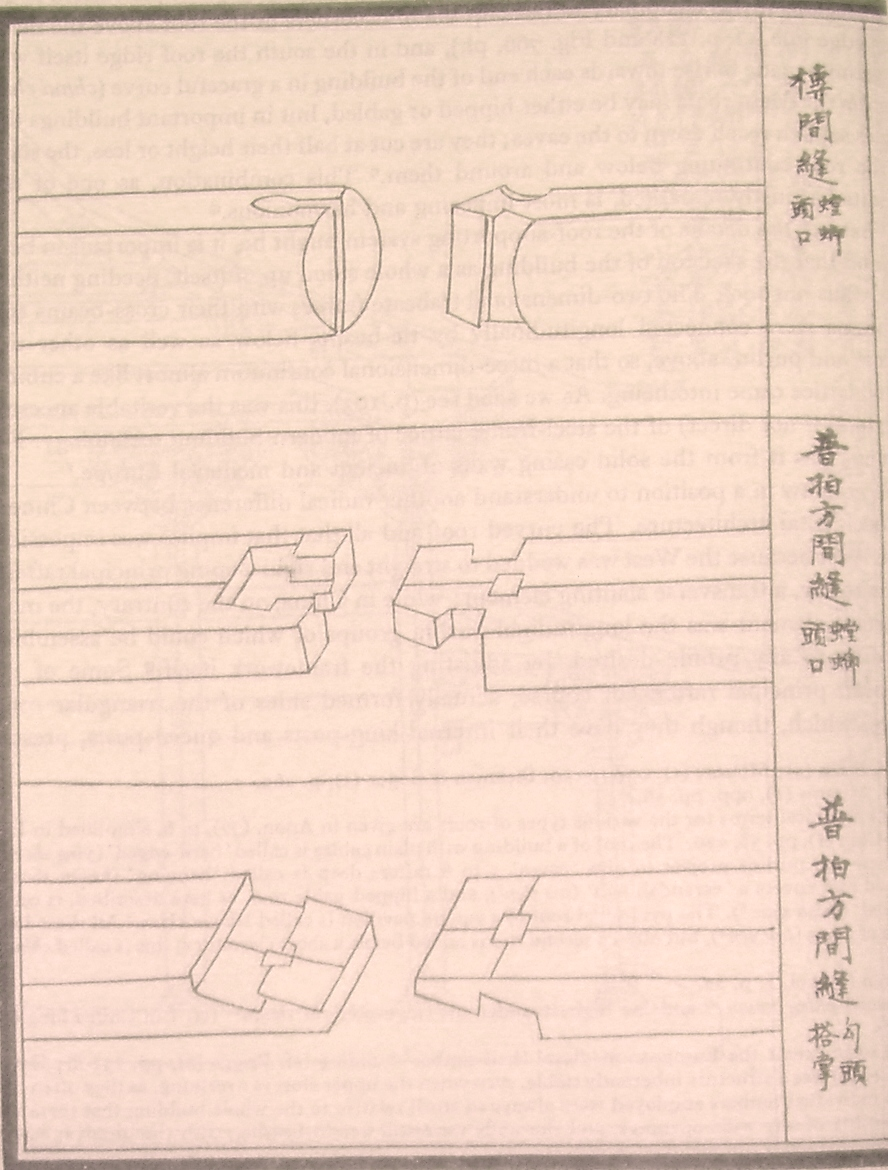
Tenon and mortice work of tie beams and cross beams, Yingzao Fashi

Some of Li's book used material from preexisting architectural writings, but most of it is documentation of the inherited traditions of craftsmen and architects passed down by word of mouth. Li's book provides a glossary of technical terms that includes mathematical formulae. He incorporated topography in his estimations for buildings on various types of sites. He also estimated the monetary costs of hiring laborers of different skill levels and types of expertise in crafts. His estimates take a day's work as their basis and include the materials needed, taking into account the season in which the work was done.

Li's work incorporates building rules and regulations, accounting information, standards for materials used in construction, and the classification of various crafts. The 34 chapters in the book specify in detail the units of measurement, the construction of moats and fortifications, and standards for stonework as well as for greater and lesser woodwork. It includes the specifications (and illustrations) for constructing bracketing units with inclined arms and joints for columns and beams, as well as directions for wood carving, turning and drilling, sawing, bamboo work, tiling, wall building, painting and decoration, and the formulas for decorative paints, glazes and various coatings. Included are the mixing proportions for mortars in masonry, brickwork and glazed tile. The book provides hand-drawn illustrations of all the practices and standards. He outlined structural carpentry in great detail, providing standard dimensional measurements for all the components. For instance, Li developed a standard 8-rank grading system for different sizes of timber elements. The system was known as the cai-fen system of units and could be applied to buildings.

Although others were written and compiled beforehand, Li's technical manual on Chinese architecture has survived intact and in its entirety.

== Gallery ==
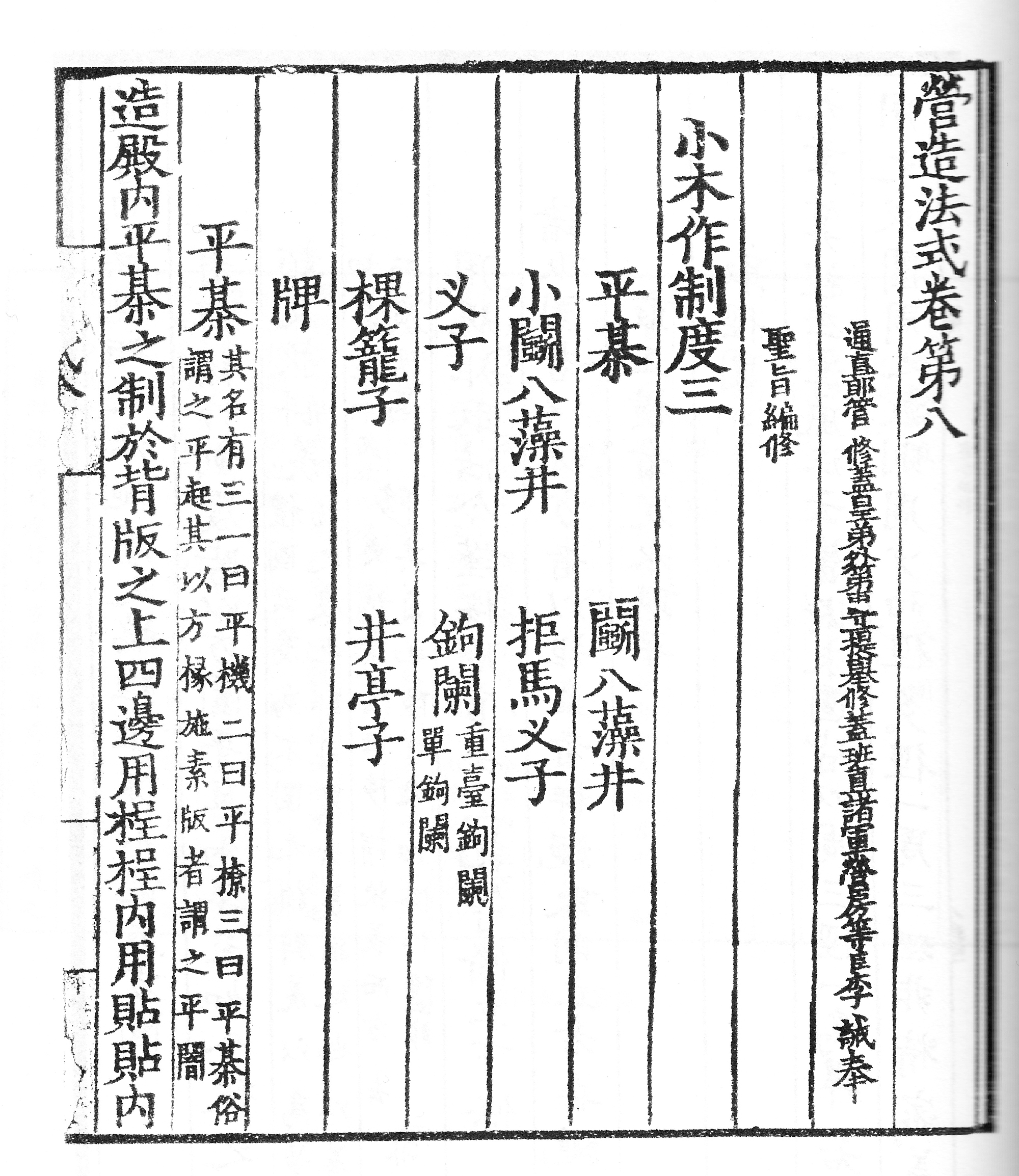
A page from 1145 Song dynasty edition of Yingzao Fashi, vol 8

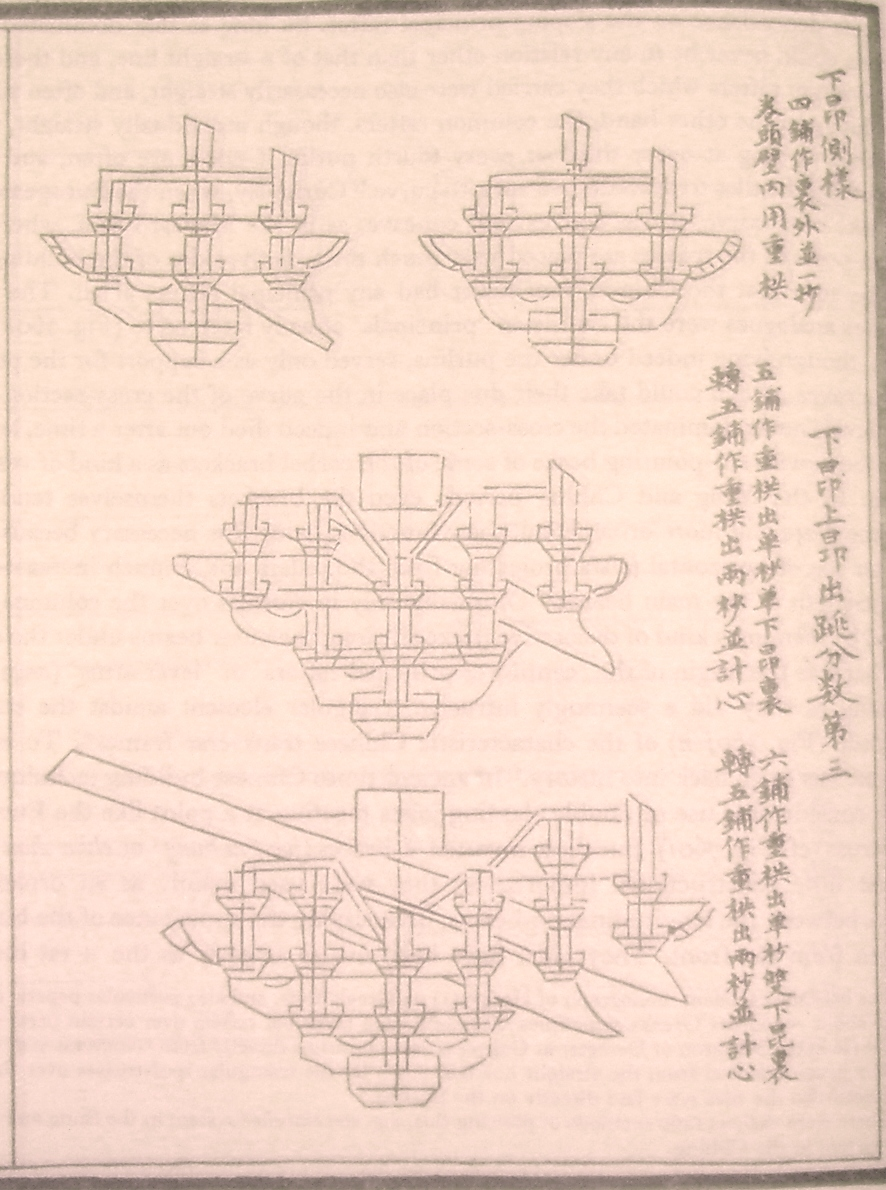
Bracket arm clusters containing cantilevers, Yingzao Fashi (1103)

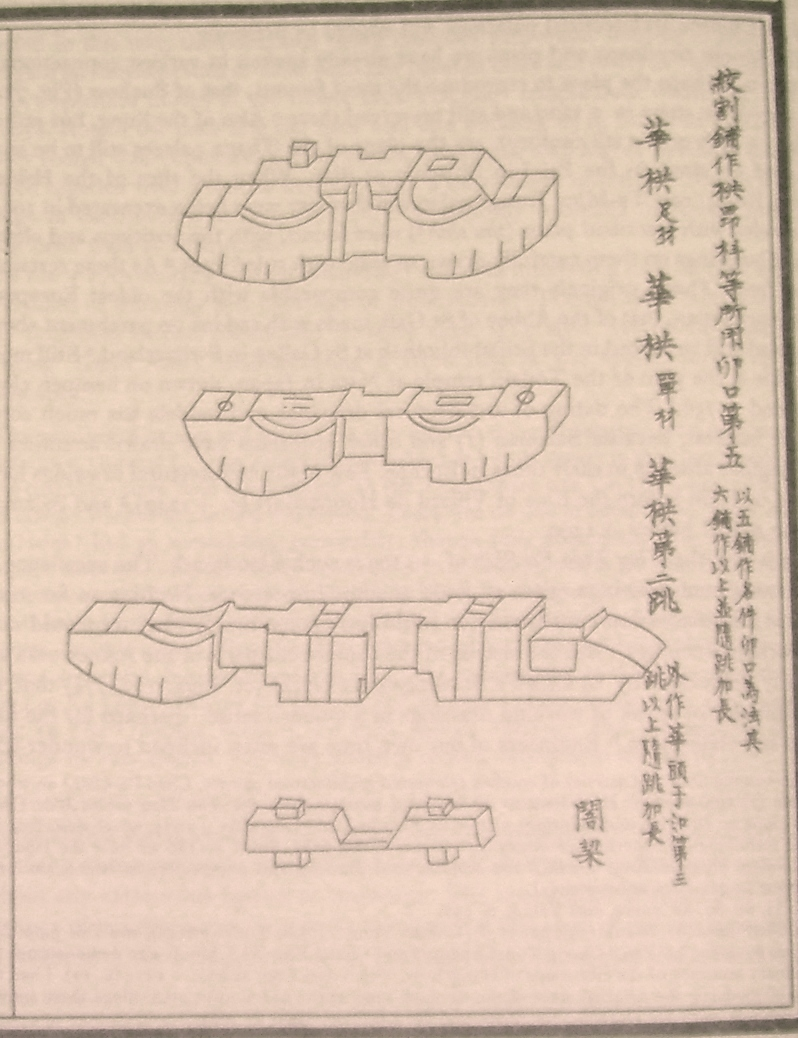
Transverse corbel brackets, Yingzao Fashi (1103)

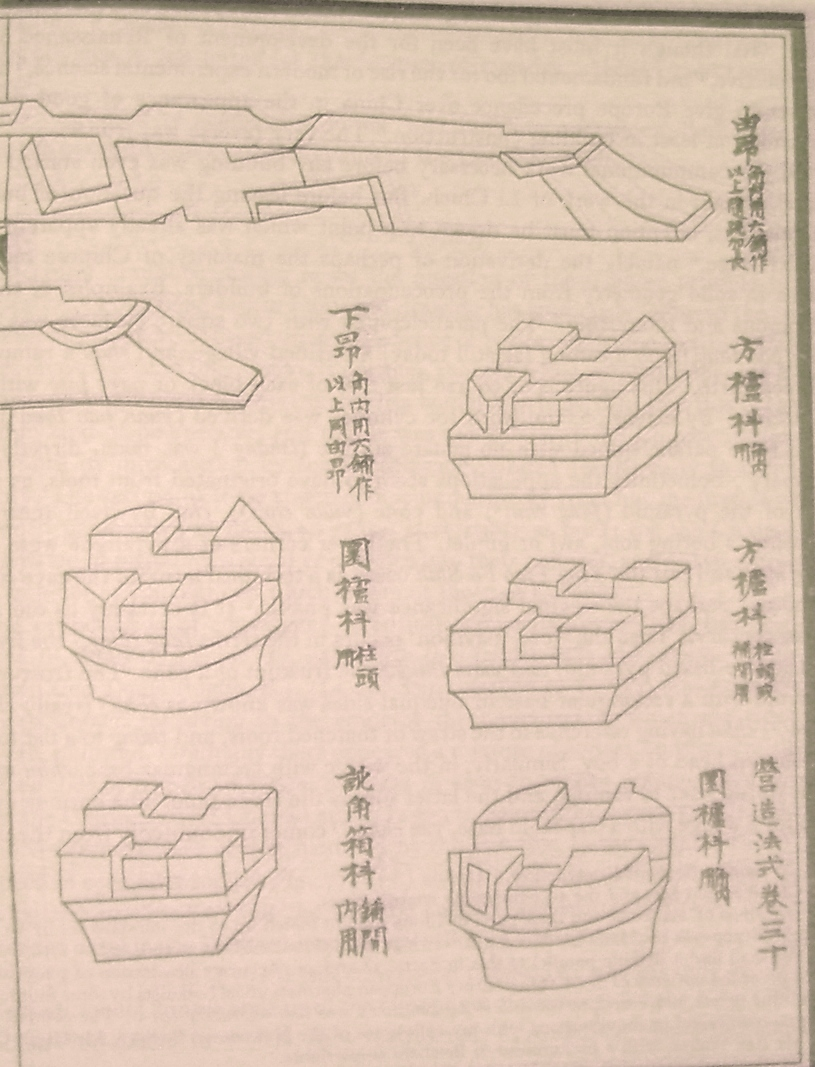
Bracket and cantilever arms, Yingzao Fashi (1103)

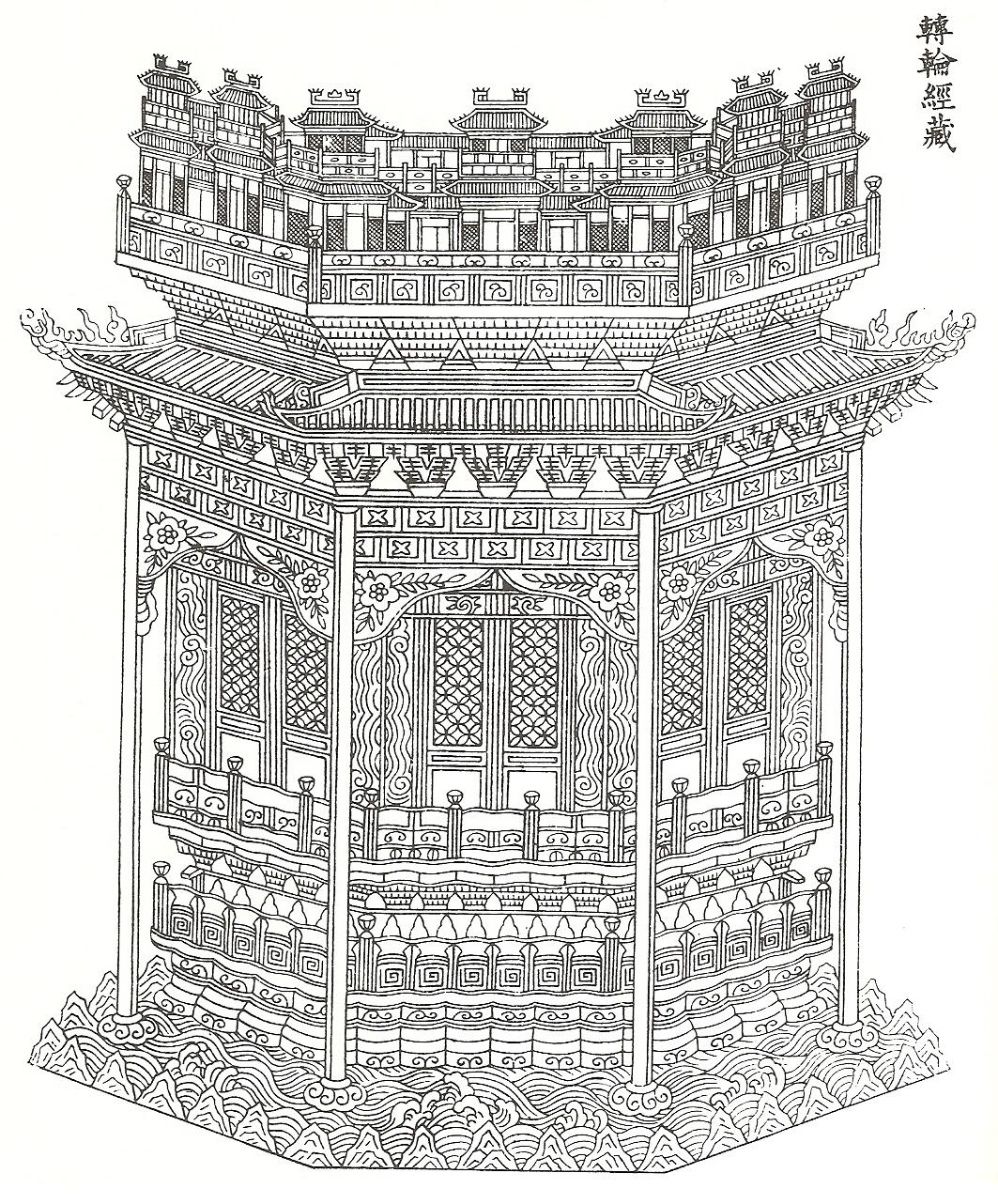
Revolving-Buddhist Sutra Case, Yingzao Fashi (1103)

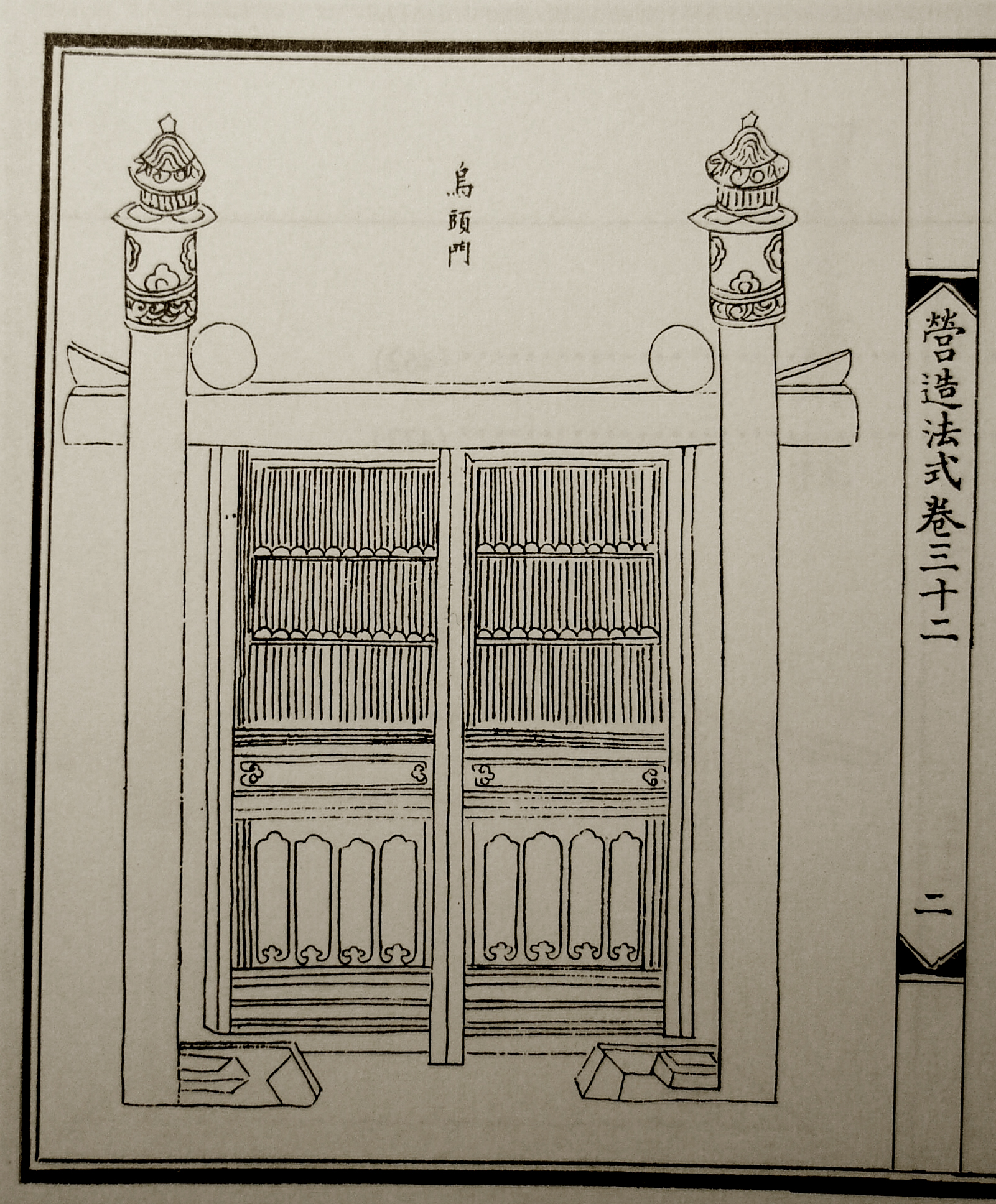
Timber frame paifang in Yingzao Fashi

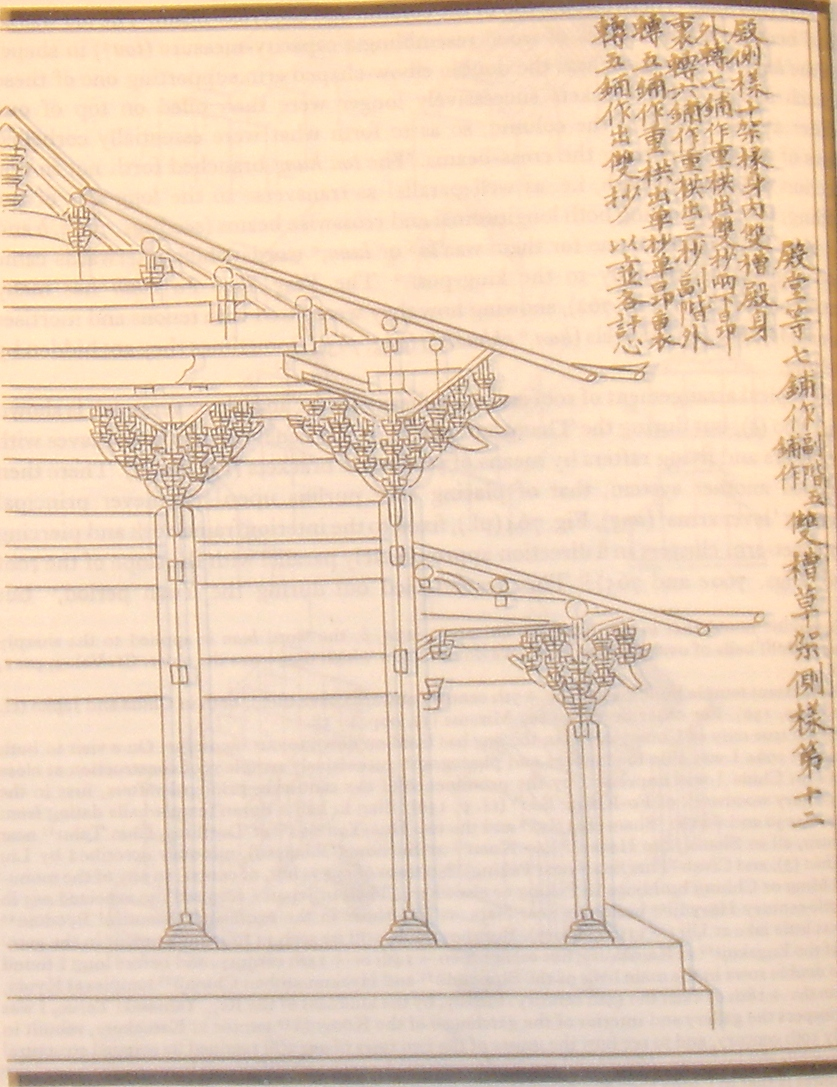
Support structure

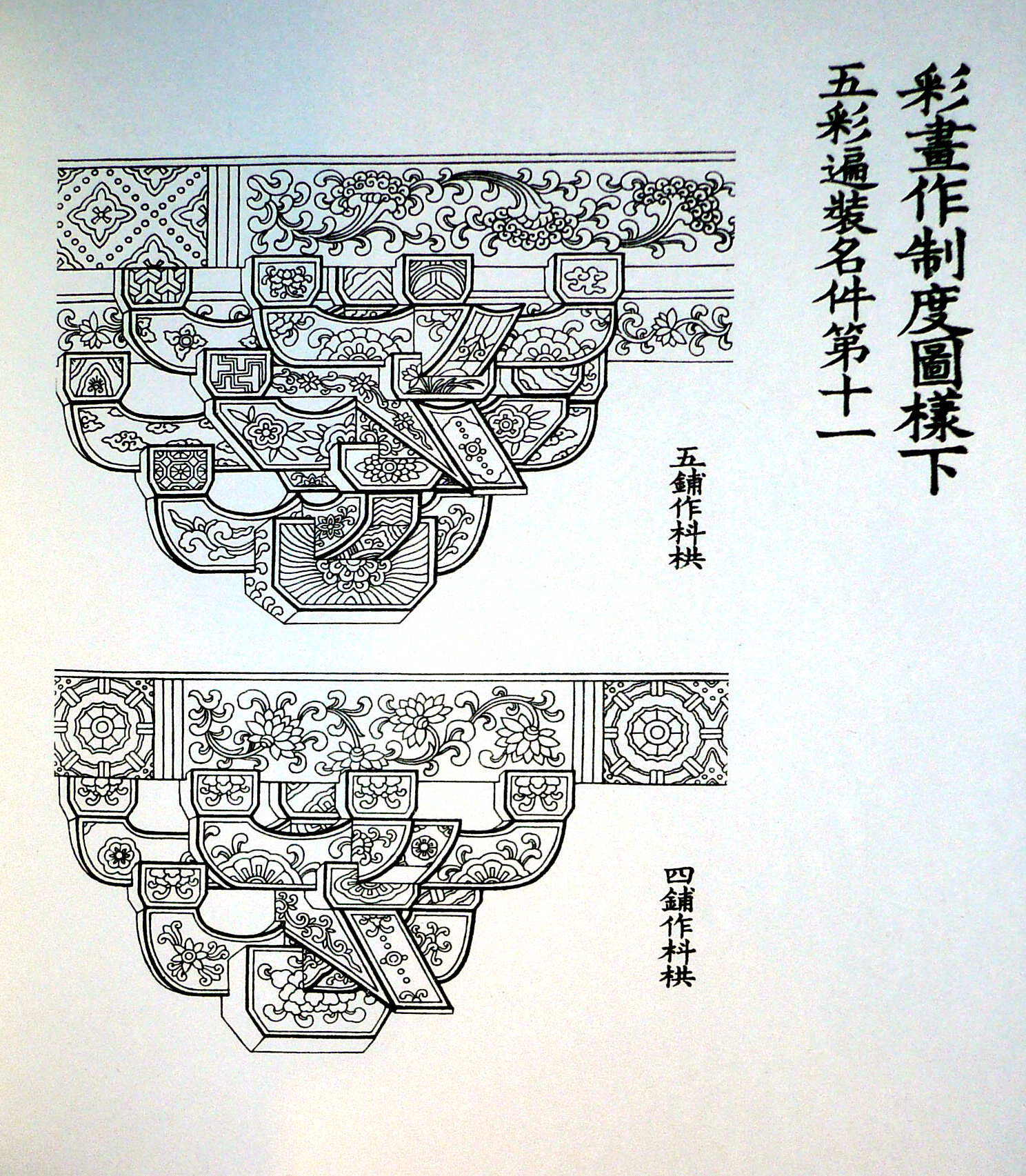
"Wucai Caihua" (Five Coloured Painting)-decorations guide.

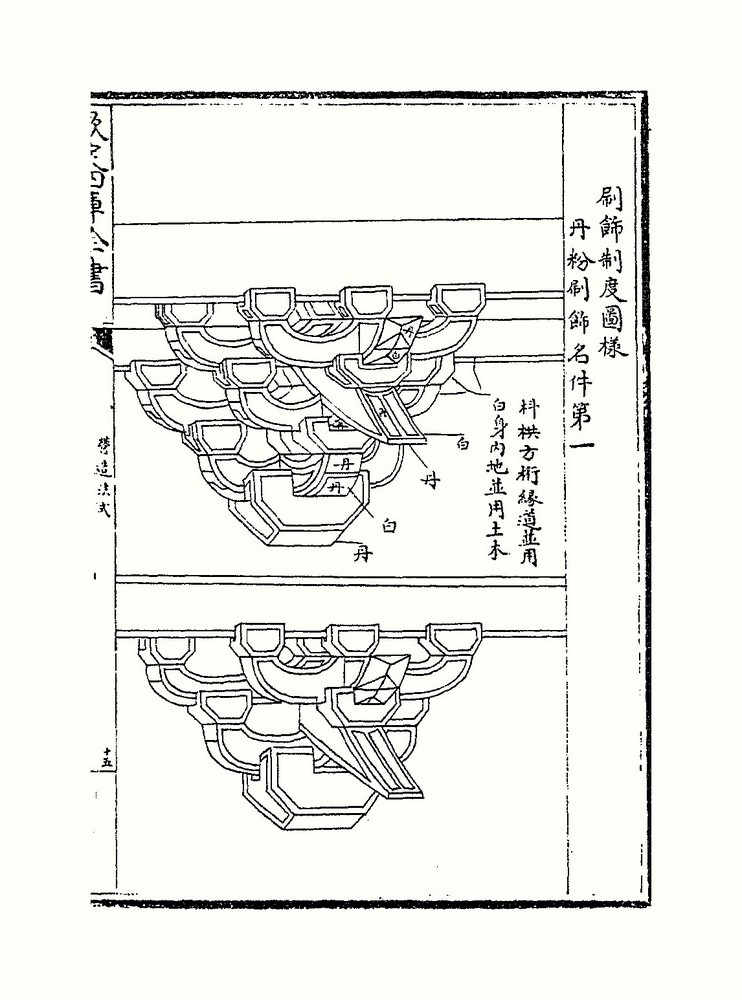
"Danfen Caihua" (Red and White)-decorations guide.

== See also ==
- Full text of the Yingzao Fashi (without illustrations) on Chinese Wikisource: Yingzao Fashi
- Architecture of the Song Dynasty
- Technology of the Song Dynasty
- De architectura
