= China Railway DJF1 =

Electric multiple unit of China Railway

DJF1 "Zhongyuan Star"
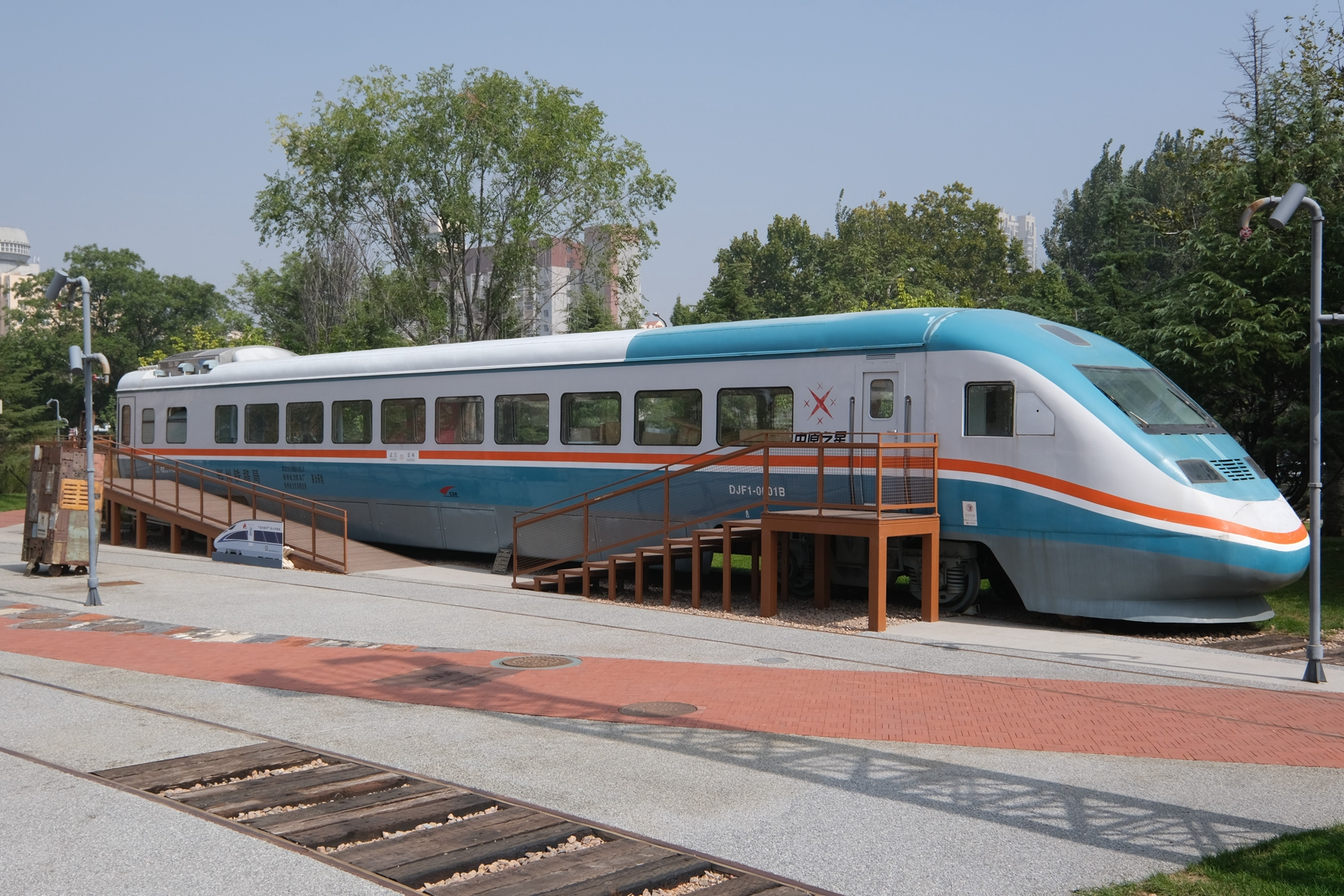
- DJF1 driving trailer carriage now preserved in Sifang locomotive and rolling stock factory
- In service: 2001-2005
- Manufacturer: Zhuzhou Electric Locomotive
- Designers: Zhuzhou Electric Locomotive, CRRC Zhuzhou Institute, Qingdao Sifang, Zhengzhou bureau
- Assembly: Zhuzhou, China
- Constructed: 2001, 2002
- Entered service: 2001
- Refurbished: 2002
- Number built: 1 set (8M6T)
- Number in service: 0
- Number preserved: 2 driving motor, 2 motor
- Predecessor: KDZ1A "Chuncheng"
- Successor: DJF2 "Xianfeng"
- Capacity: 1392
- Operator: China Railway

Specifications
- Car length: 27 m (88 ft 7 in) (control car); 25.5 m (83 ft 8 in) (other cars)
- Width: 3,204 mm (10 ft 6.1 in)
- Height: 3,950 mm (13 ft 0 in)
- Wheel diameter: 915 mm (3.002 ft) (new)
- Maximum speed: 178 km/h (111 mph) (test maximum)
- Axle load: 16 tonnes (16 long tons; 18 short tons)
- Traction system: IGBT-VVVF
- Traction motors: JD-112
- Power output: 200 kW
- Tractive effort: 3200 kW (6 car layout); 6400 kW (14 car layout)
- Transmission: AC–DC–AC
- Acceleration: 1.44 km/(h⋅s) (0.89 mph/s)
- Power supply: 25 kV AC
- Bogies: DDB-1, DTB-2
- Braking systems: Regenerative braking, air brake
- Track gauge: 1,435 mm (4 ft 8 1/2 in)

The DJF_{1} "Zhongyuan Star" was an electric multiple unit of China Railway. It only operated in service for less than five years, before it was removed from service due to its various flaws and high maintenance costs. The train was initially built as a six car set, and subsequently lengthened to a fourteen car set. The two driving motors and the middle two motor cars have been preserved, with the other carriages being scrapped.

== History ==
=== Research ===
From the late 1990s onwards, with the progression of the multiple rounds of railway speed-ups, in order to fulfill passenger rail demands, various locomotive factories in China built a number of diesel and electric multiple units for Nanchang, Harbin, Shanghai, Kunming and Guangzhou bureaus. A similar event happened on 3 July 2000, with Zhengzhou bureau signing an agreement for cooperation with Zhuzhou Locomotive, Zhuzhou Institute and Qingdao Sifang, to jointly develop an EMU with a top speed of 160 km/h (99 mph) and using AC transmission for a total cost of CN¥36,000,000. On 18 June 2001, the Ministry of Railways and CSR held a conference on the design of alternating current, power separated EMUs, during which the design of the DJF_{1} was also approved.

This new EMU was officially named the DJF_{1}, where "D", "J" and "F" respectively describes the characteristics of the train: D for "电力动车组" (EMU), J for "交流传动" (AC) and F for "动力分散" (power separated).

=== Operational tests ===
On 21 September 2001, the DJF_{1}, now named the "Zhongyuan Star" was rolled out in a ribbon cutting ceremony, along with the China Railway DJ2 "Olympic Star" electric locomotive at Zhuzhou Electric Locomotive, with the deputy minister for railways, Cai Qinghua, Hunan Province deputy governor Zheng Maoqing and the manager and deputy manager of Zhengzhou bureau, Feng Lingyun and Xu Yifa in attendance. After being rolled out, the DJF_{1} was transported to the China Academy of Railway Beijing ring railway for operational and safety tests, which it passed successfully. On 19 October 2001, it departed Beijing for Zhengzhou. Under the guidance of the ministry, Zhuzhou Electric Locomotive and Zhengzhou bureau, the DJF_{1} began publicly testing on the Jingguang railway from 23 October between Zhengzhou—Xuchang—Xiaoshangqiao—Wuchang; However, problems relating to control logic appeared not long after entering the line for testing. After a period of diagnosis, the problem was solved on the morning of the 24th. The public tests were completed on 26 October, during which it had travelled a total of 2,815 km (1,749 mi), reaching a maximum speed of 178 km/h (111 mph). To fulfill the maintenance demands of the set, a 560 metre long ditch was exclusively built for the use of the DJF_{1} at Zhengzhou bureau, Zhengzhou sector.

On 4 November 2001, the General Secretary and President Jiang Zemin, with the accompaniment of minister for railways Fu Zhihuan, and Shijiazhuan Electric sector inspected the DJ2 and the DJF_{1}.

=== Operation ===
On 18 November 2001, the DJF_{1} was put into operation to with service T491/492, with T491 departing Zhengzhou every morning at 7:28, arriving at Wuchang at 13:37; then returning with service T492 at 14:54 and arriving back at Zhengzhou at 21:10, with stops at Xiaogan, Xinyang, Zhumadian, Luohe and Xuchang, shrinking the journey time by 3 hours. On 28 December, Zhengzhou bureau changed the timetable by adding service T501/502 from Zhengzhou to Hankou to be operated by the DJF_{1} and stopping only one stop, at Xinyang, with service T501 departing every day at 07:43 from Zhengzhou and arriving at Hankou at 12:59; T502 would depart Hankou at 15:50, returning to Zhengzhou at 21:10, taking 5 hours and 20 minutes for the journey, reducing the original travel time by 45 minutes. As the DJF_{1} was switched to the new service, T491/492 started using double deck 25K carriages again.

The DJF_{1} was originally built as a six car set with a capacity of 548 people with a single price for any distance. This was set at CN¥119 for soft seat and CN¥76 for hard seat. Due to the large passenger demand but insufficient seats, service T501/502 was never profitable. Even with each seat being occupied, the service lost an average of CN¥30,000 per day, due to costs from electricity. To increase the carrying capacity and thus operating efficiency, Zhengzhou bureau signed a contract in 2002 with Zhuzhou Electric Loocmotive, Zhuzhou Institute and Sifang for expanding the six car set into a fourteen car set, increasing maximum capacity to 1398 people. For this, the DJF_{1} was removed from service from 11 May 2002, departing for modifications at Qingdao. This was completed, and then transferred to Zhuzhou on 8 July for fitting out and testing. Other features fitted were at the request of Zhengzhou bureau, such as vacuum toilets, emergency air conditioning electrical supply and LCD televisions. The entire set was returned to Zhengzhou on 8 September, and passed various tests, re-enterting service on 28 September in time for Golden Week holidays.

However, the train still had an inconsistent performance. Various faults would occur; the components that had the most faults were the traction transformers, auxiliary inverters, auxiliary power supply and microcomputer controls. The set failed often in service, which not only affected the on-time running of services, but also led to passenger frustration and damage to the reputation of the railway bureau. Some breakdowns were severe enough that the set could not continue on its on. On 5 September 2004, while operating T502 from Wuchang to Zhengzhou, a fault occurred as the seat was near Xiaogang, where an axle in carriage ten became jammed. After passengers were moved to other carriages, traction unit three (carriages 8 to 10) were removed, and the set continued on with eleven cars to Zhengzhou.

By November 2005, the DJF_{1} had run over 1,800,000 km (1,118,468 mi), transporting over 1,900,000 passengers. It was replaced in service from June 2006, with T501/502 being instead assigned to 25K double deck carriages, while the DJF_{1} being stored at Zhengzhou. It was returned to Qingdao Sifang in June 2007, where it became a spare parts donor, and was progressively dismantled. With the old factory buildings at Sifang being dismantled, ten of the carriages were also dismantled, except for the four motor cars, which have since then been stored at the China Railway Museum.

== Technical features ==
=== Overall structure ===
The DJF_{1} was designed as a power separated EMU, with two motors and a trailer forming a traction unit. The train has the ability to be rearranged, and could be expanded with demand. Initially, in its six car form, it consisted two traction units, with a total tractive effort of 3200 kW. With the expansion of it into a fourteen car set with four traction units, the tractive effort was increased to 6400 kW. Operation can be conducted with just one raised pantograph, with a high voltage cable linking all cars to distribute power.

The carriage body was built with a drum shape, and the thin wall structure was supported with a welded frame, built with mostly aluminium, ABS and polycarbonates, with an emphasis on lighter materials. Each carriage was connected with a tightlock coupler, and the control cars had a streamlined design built of fibreglass, while skirts under each carriage smooth airflow. Only the two driving motors are soft seat carriages in a two by two reclinable layout; the hard seat carriages were in a two by three seat layout. All carriages had a luggage room, conductor's room, tea boilers, toilets and locally manufactured plug doors.

=== Transmission ===
The DJF_{1} had an AC—DC—AC transmission, with every traction unit having a primary transformer in the trailer between the two motors. The two motor carriages are fitted with inverters and traction motors.

The DJF_{1} used mostly domestically built parts, developed by Zhuzhou Institute. The AC transmission used has three components: PMW inverter, DC return and IGBT controls rated at 3300V/1200A, which dissipates heat with a heat sink and air cooling. The JD112 traction motors are three-phase, asynchronous motor with a rated output of 200 kW.

Auxiliary electronics are split into two independent units for seven carriages each, with centralised rectifiers but individual inverters, providing 600V DC to each carriage, which is passed through an inverter to become two-phase 220 V AC.

=== Control system ===
The DJF_{1} used a microcomputer control based on the Adtranz "MICAS-S2", using the TCN standard. The controls are separated into three lines, the set control, the carriage control and control cable. Each traction unit has a single connector for the cables.

=== Bogie ===
The DJF_{1} used two different types of bogies, the DDB-1 for motors and DTB-2 for trailers. These two bogies feature a different structure, though they were both developed using existing Sifang designs, while incorporating foreign designs for a bolsterless bogie. The bogies had two stage suspension, with the carriage resting on air cushioned springs of the second stage suspension, which in turn is on the springs of the first stage suspension.

Carriage number	1	2	3	4	5	6	7	8	9	10	11	12	13	14
Carriage registration	DJF1-0001A RZ_{25DD} 110964	YZ_{25DT} 348274	YZ_{25DD} 348272	YZ_{25DT} 349110	YZ_{25DD} 349106	YZ_{25DT} 349111	YZ_{25DD} 349107	YZ_{25DD} 349108	YZ_{25DT} 349112	YZ_{25DD} 349109	YZ_{25DT} 349113	YZ_{25DD} 348273	YZ_{25DT} 348275	DJF1-0001B RZ_{25DD} 110965
Type	soft seat	hard seat												soft seat
Traction	●● ●●	〇〇 〇〇	●● ●●	〇〇 〇〇	●● ●●	〇〇 〇〇	●● ●●		〇〇 〇〇	●● ●●	〇〇 〇〇	●● ●●	〇〇 〇〇	●● ●●
Traction	①				②			③				④		
Traction	Mc	Tp	M	T	M	T	M		T	M	T	M	Tp	Mc
Equipment	driver's cabin traction motors	pantographs traction converters	air compressors traction motors		traction motors	primary transformer	air compressors traction motors		primary transformer	traction motors		air compressors traction motors	pantographs traction converters	driver's cabin traction motors
Occupancy	68	98	108	102	108	102	108		102	108	102	108	98	68
Notes				additional cars built in 2002										

== See also ==
- DDJ1 "Great White Shark"
- DJJ1 "Blue Arrow"
- China Star
