= Yang Xinhai =

Chinese serial killer (1968–2004)

- 杨新海
- Yang during his interrogation, 2003
- Born: 17 July 1968; Yangtaozhuang, Zhengyang County, Zhumadian, Henan, China
- Died: 14 February 2004 (aged 35); Luohe, Henan, China
- Cause of death: Execution by shooting
- Other names: Yang Zhiya (杨枝牙); Yang Liu (杨柳)
- Convictions: Murder (67 counts); Rape (23 counts)
- Penalty: Death

Details
- Victims: 67
- Span of crimes: 19 September 2000 – 8 August 2003
- Country: China
- States: Anhui; Hebei; Henan; Shandong
- Date apprehended: 3 November 2003

Yang Xinhai (Chinese: 杨新海; pinyin: Yáng Xīnhǎi; 17 July 1968 – 14 February 2004) was a Chinese serial killer, serial rapist, and mass murderer who confessed to committing 67 murders and 23 rapes between 2000 and 2003. He was sentenced to death and executed. He is the most prolific known serial killer in China since the establishment of the People's Republic of China in 1949. The South China Morning Post dubbed Yang the "Monster Killer".

== Biography ==
Yang was born in Yangtaozhuang village in Zhengyang County, Henan, the fourth of six children to a farming family. The Yang family were amongst the poorest in the village, often having to forage for wild vegetables and living in a shack consisting of a living area, kitchen, and cow stall. In his childhood, Yang was known for his drawing skills and was regarded as a good student who won several school awards, but was also noted to be a loner with no friends. He attended Runanbu Junior High School, where he neglected his education and eventually dropped out in 1985, running away from home to work in construction. Yang had left a letter claiming he had been accepted into a boarding school, and though the deception was eventually uncovered, Yang visited his hometown three times between 1985 and 1992, after which he never returned again.

== Crimes ==
While working as a migrant worker, Yang took numerous manual labor jobs across North and East China. He was regularly not paid his agreed wages, and in one instance, Yang stole a metal tray from a restaurant he worked at in Xi'an, leading to his first criminal conviction for theft in 1988, for which he served a labor camp sentence. In 1991, Yang was again sentenced to labor camp for theft in Shijiazhuang.

After his second release, Yang led a small gang of beggars who committed several thefts, burglaries, and assaults. In 1996, while in Zhumadian, Yang was convicted of attempted rape after the victim fought him off and bit off part of his tongue. He was released in 1999.

Yang's killings took place between 2000 and 2003 in the provinces of Anhui, Hebei, Henan, and Shandong. At night, he would enter his victims' homes and kill all of the occupants—mainly farmers—with axes, hammers, and shovels, sometimes killing entire families. Each time he wore new clothes and large shoes.

== Arrest, trial, and execution ==
Yang was arrested on 3 November 2003 while staying in Cangzhou. Police had been called around midnight after someone spotted a suspicious person at the railway station. Two police officers spotted Yang loitering outside of a nearby primary school in Xinhua District, and upon approaching him, Yang fled towards the train tracks. He was caught at a culvert and arrested after attempting to stab the officers with a folding knife.

Police took him in for questioning, where Yang admitted to his prior criminal history. By the following morning, interrogators found that he was wanted for murder in four provinces. His DNA was matched to the most recent murders in Shijiazhuang, which were being investigated by the Ministry of Public Security.

Yang was sentenced to death by the Luohe City Intermediate People's Court, Henan, on 1 February 2004. At the time of his sentencing, official Chinese media believed he had carried out China's longest and grisliest killing spree. Yang was executed on 14 February 2004 by shooting and he was cremated.

=== Motive ===
According to some media reports at the time of his arrest, Yang's motive for the killings was revenge against society as a result of a breakup. Yang had made a wedding promise with his childhood girlfriend, but upon returning to the village in 1992, he found that she was going to marry a different man. Later media reports claimed that his enjoyment of robbery, rape, and murder was the motive.

While Yang never formally provided a motive, he was quoted as saying:

"When I killed people, I had a desire. This inspired me to kill more. I don't care whether they deserve to live or not. It is none of my concern ... I have no desire to be part of society. Society is not my concern."

== Chronology of murders ==
- 19 September 2000, Guozhuang Village, Beijiao Township, Chuanhui District, Zhoukou, Henan, 2 murders
- 1 October 2000, Chunshuzhuang, Xiaoying Village, Wangdian Town, Yingzhou District, Fuyang, Anhui, 3 murders, 1 rape
- 15 August 2001, Fangcheliu Village, Juling Township, Linying County, Luohe, Henan, 3 murders, 1 rape
- Autumn 2001, Kanglou Township, Xihua County, Zhoukou, Henan, 2 murders
- Winter 2001, a village southeast of the county town of Ye County, Pingdingshan, Henan, 2 murders
- 27 January 2002, Tongxu County, Kaifeng, Henan, 3 murders, 1 rape
- 30 June 2002, Chaigang Township, Fugou County, Zhoukou, Henan, 4 murders, 1 rape
- 28 July 2002, Dengzhou, Nanyang, Henan, 4 murders, 2 rapes
- 22 October 2002, Zhaihu Village, Songji Township, Xiping County, Zhumadian, Henan, 2 murders, 1 rape, 1 seriously injured
- 8 November 2002, Gaoli Village, Shaodian Township, Shangcai County, Zhumadian, Henan, 4 murders, 2 rapes, 1 seriously injured
- 16 November 2002, Liuzhuang Village, Zhangshi Town, Weishi County, Kaifeng, Henan, 2 murders, 1 rape
- 19 November 2002, Shiguai Village, Wangmeng Township, Linying County, Luohe, Henan, 2 murders
- 1 December 2002, Yanwan Village, Wangpiliu Town, Luyi County, Zhoukou, Henan, 2 murders, 1 rape, 1 seriously injured
- 6 December 2002, Liuzhuang Village, Renhe Township, Xiping County, Zhumadian, Henan, 5 murders, 1 rape
- 13 December 2002, Sijia Village, Malan Township, Yanling County, Xuchang, Henan, 2 murders
- 15 December 2002, Xiaolizhuang, Miaocha Town, Linquan County, Fuyang, Anhui, 3 murders, 1 rape
- 5 February 2003, Kuzhuang Township, Xiangcheng County, Xuchang, Henan, 3 murders, 1 rape, 1 seriously injured
- 18 February 2003, Chiying Township, Xihua County, Zhoukou, Henan, 4 murders, 2 rapes
- 23 March 2003, Chengguan Town, Minquan County, Shangqiu, Henan, 4 murders, 1 rape
- 2 April 2003, Sanlizhai Village, Taoyuan Town, Cao County, Heze, Shandong, 2 murders
- 5 August 2003, Lidao Village, Xingtai, Hebei, 3 murders
- 8 August 2003, Dongliangxiang Village, Qiaoxi District, Shijiazhuang, Hebei, 5 murders

Totals: 26 incidents, 67 murders (66 listed), 23 rapes (17 listed), 10 intentional serious injuries (4 listed)

== Aftermath ==
Nine days after Yang's arrest, another serial killer, Huang Yong, was arrested. As both men were migrant workers from Zhumadian, there was media interest in the link between historical poverty and recently increased crime rates in south Henan.

== See also ==
- List of serial killers in China
- List of serial killers by number of victims
