= Xiping =

Xiping may refer to:

== Locations in China ==
=== Henan ===
- Xiping County, a county in Henan
  - Xiping railway station, a station in the county
- Xiping, Xixia County (西坪), a town in Xixia County, Henan

=== Elsewhere ===
- Xiping, Shanxi (西坪), a town in Datong County, Shanxi
- Xiping, Fujian (西坪), a town in Anxi County, Fujian
- Xiping, Guizhou (西坪), a town in Zunyi, Guizhou
- Xiping Township (西屏乡), a township in Jiangyou, Sichuan
- Xiping Subdistrict, Qujing (西平街道), a subdistrict in Zhanyi District, Qujing, Yunnan
- Xiping Subdistrict, Songyang County (西屏街道), a subdistrict in Songyang County, Zhejiang
- Xiping Station, a metro station in Dongguan, Guangdong
- Xiping, Datong Hui and Tu Autonomous County, Qinghai

== Historical eras ==
- Xiping (熹平, 172–178), era name used by Emperor Ling of Han
- Xiping (熙平, 516–518), era name used by Emperor Xiaoming of Northern Wei

== People ==
- Fang Xiping, Chinese politician
- Zhu Xiping, Chinese mathematician
