= Luohe–Fuyang railway =

Railway line in China

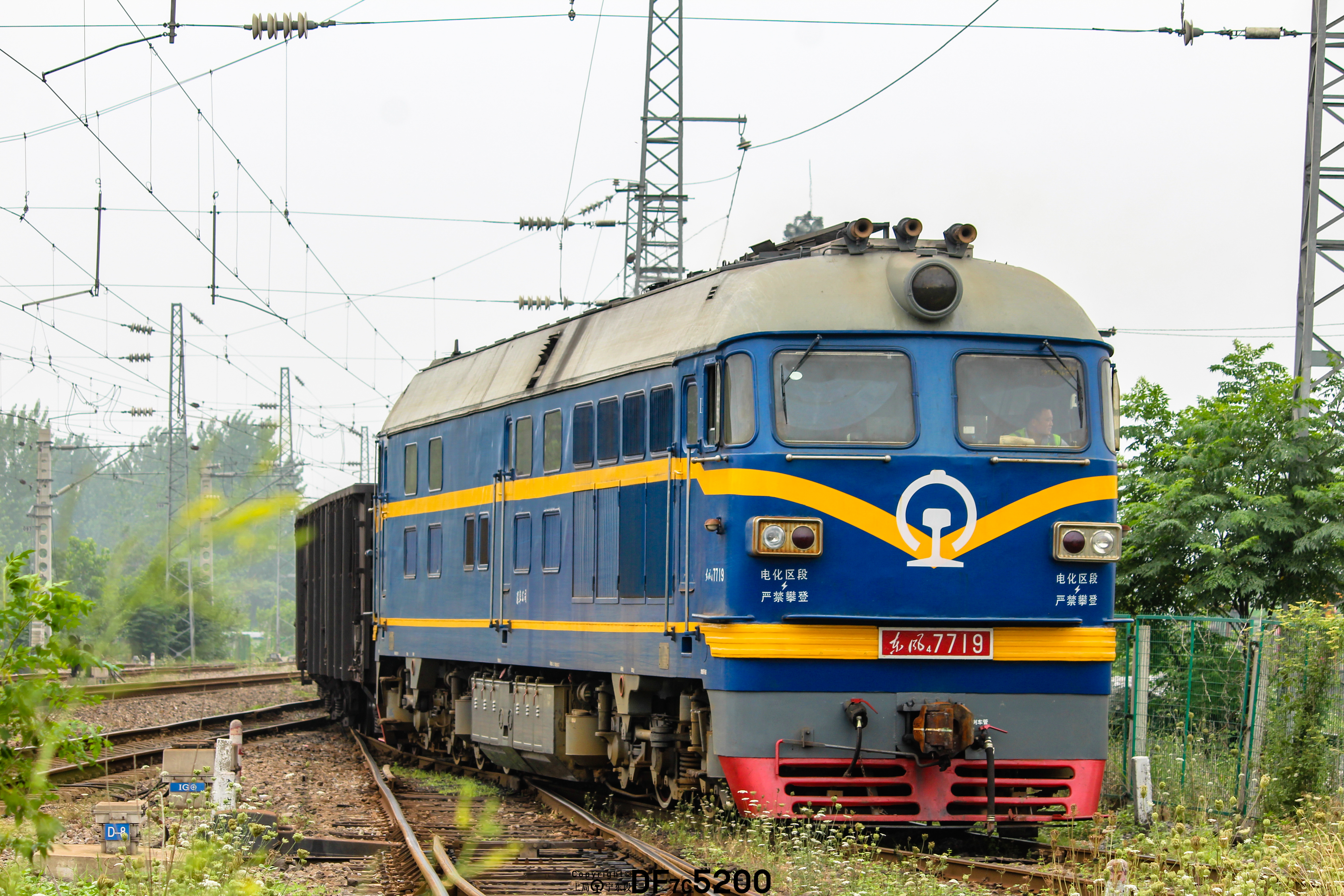
Dongfeng 4B diesel locomotive used on the Luohe-Fuyang Railway, Fuyang West Station, 2018.

The Luohe–Fuyang railway (Chinese: 漯阜铁路) is a railway line in China.

The line opened in stages and was fully opened on 30 October 1990.

== Connections ==
- Luohe: Beijing–Guangzhou railway, Luohe–Baofeng railway
- Fuyang: Beijing–Kowloon railway, Qinglongshan–Fuyang railway, Fuyang–Lu'an railway, Fuyang-Huainan railway
