= Lin Ying =

Lin Ying or Linying may refer to

== People ==
- Lin Ying (badminton) (born 1963), Chinese badminton player
- Maya Lin (born 1959), or Lin Ying, American architectural designer
- Linying (singer-songwriter) (born 1994), Singaporean singer-songwriter

== Other ==
- Linying County
- Linying railway station
