= Madian =

Madian may refer to these places:

== Towns ==
China

- Madian, Anhui (马店), in Huoqiu County, Anhui
- Madian, Hebei (马店), in Anping County, Hebei
- Madian, Henan (马店), in Luoning County, Henan
- Madian, Shandong (麻店), in Huimin County, Shandong

India

- Madian, Birbhum, in West Bengal

== Neighborhoods ==
- Madian, Beijing (马甸), in Haidian District, Beijing

== See also ==
- Midian, a place and name of a people mentioned in the Bible and Quran, believed to be in northwest Arabia
