= Suiping railway station =

Railway station in Xiping County, Zhumadian, Henan, China

Suiping 遂平

General information
- Location: Xiping County, Zhumadian, Henan; China
- Coordinates: 33°08′45″N 114°01′49″E
- Operator: CR Wuhan
- Line: Beijing–Guangzhou railway
- Distance: Beijing–Guangzhou railway: 845 kilometres (525 mi) from Beijing West; 1,451 kilometres (902 mi) from Guangzhou
- Platforms: 3 (1 side platform and 1 island platform)
- Tracks: 6

Other information
- Station code: 20852 (TMIS code); SON (telegraph code); SPI (Pinyin code)
- Classification: Class 3 station (三等站)

History
- Opened: 1903; 123 years ago

Services
Preceding station	China Railway	Following station
Xiping towards Beijing West	Beijing–Guangzhou railway	Zhumadian towards Guangzhou
Location
- Location within Henan Location within China

Suiping railway station (Chinese: 遂平站) is a station on Beijing–Guangzhou railway in Suiping County, Zhumadian, Henan.

== History ==
The station was established in 1903.
