= Huoqiu County =

Huoqiu 霍邱县 Hwokiu
- County
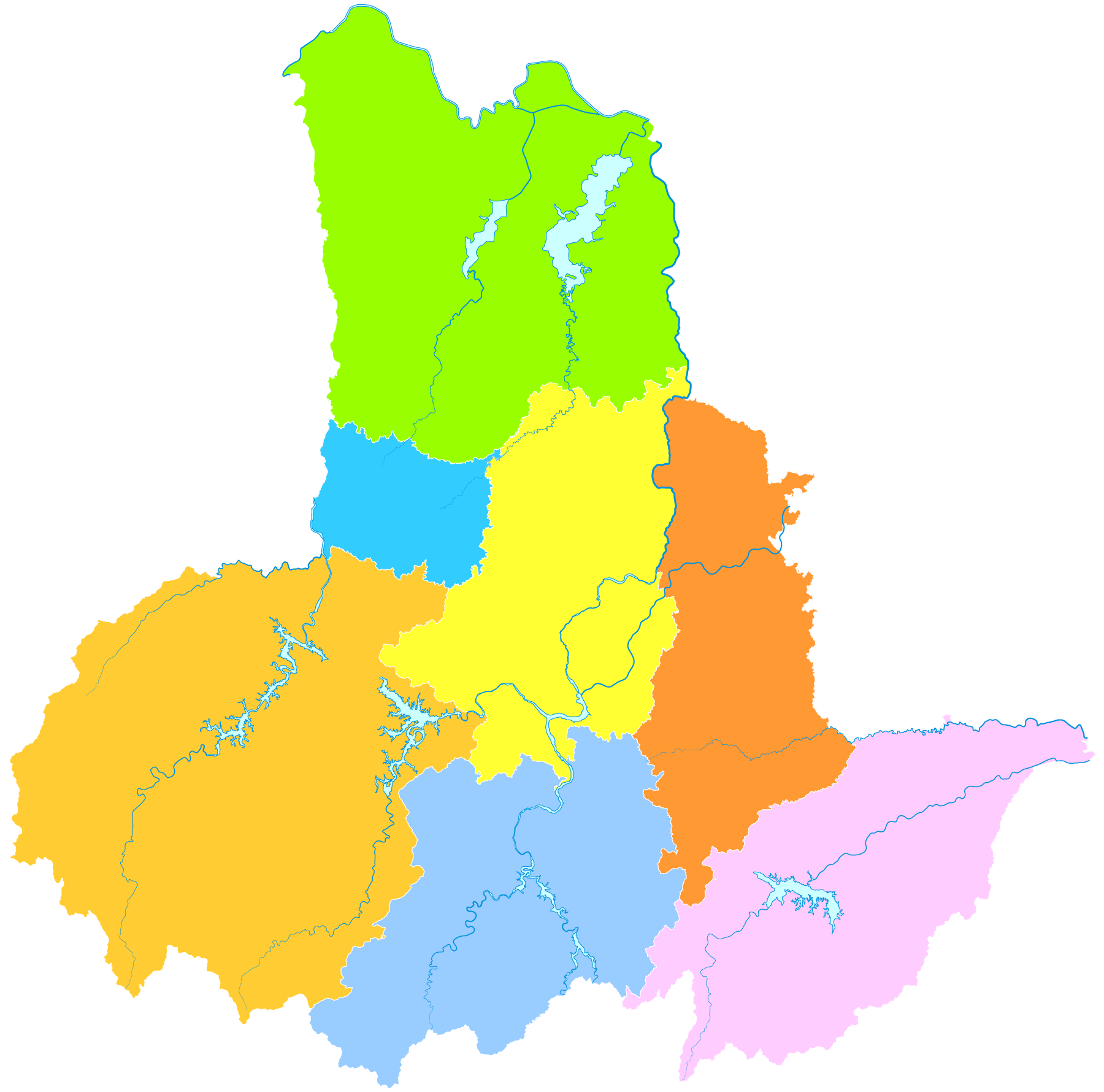
- Huoqiu is the northernmost division in this map of Lu'an

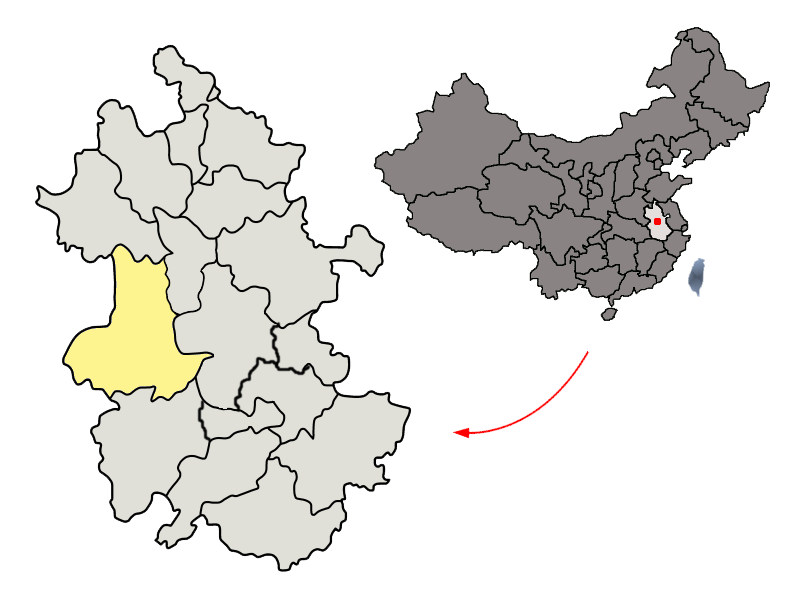
- Lu'an in Anhui
- Coordinates: 32°21′11″N 116°16′41″E
- Country: People's Republic of China
- Province: Anhui
- Prefecture-level city: Lu'an

Area
  - Total: 3,239 km^{2} (1,251 sq mi)

Population (2018)
  - Total: 1,198,000
  - Density: 369.9/km^{2} (958.0/sq mi)
- Time zone: UTC+8 (China Standard)
- Postal code: 237400

Huoqiu County (simplified Chinese: 霍邱县; traditional Chinese: 霍邱縣; pinyin: Huòqiū Xiàn) is a county in the west of Anhui Province, People's Republic of China, under the jurisdiction of Lu'an City and bordering Henan province to the west. It has a population of 1,640,000 and an area of 3,483 square kilometres (1,345 sq mi). The government of Huoqiu County is located in Chengguan Town.

Huoqiu County has jurisdiction over 19 towns and 10 townships.

== Administrative divisions ==
In the present, Huoqiu County has 22 towns and 11 townships.

22 Towns

- Chengguan (城关镇)
- Yaoli (姚李镇)
- Hongji (洪集镇)
- Caomiao (曹庙镇)
- Zhongxingji (众兴集镇)
- Xiadian (夏店镇)
- Wulong (乌龙镇)
- Huhu (户胡镇)
- Longtan (龙潭镇)
- Shidian (石店镇)
- Fengjing (冯井镇)
- Linshui (临水镇)
- Gaotang (高塘镇)
- Chalu (岔路镇)
- Xindian (新店镇)
- Mengji (孟集镇)
- Huayuan (花园镇)
- Zhouji (周集镇)
- Madian (马店镇)
- Changji (长集镇)
- Hekou (河口镇)
- Yeji (叶集镇)

11 Townships

- Songdian (宋店乡)
- Sanliu (三流乡)
- Chengxihu (城西湖乡)
- Linhuaigang (临淮岗乡)
- Shaogang (邵岗乡)
- Bailian (白莲乡)
- Fanqiao (范桥乡)
- Wangdailiu (王截流乡)
- Panji (潘集乡)
- Pengta (彭塔乡)
- Fengling (冯瓴乡)

== Climate ==
Climate data for Huoqiu, elevation 28 m (92 ft), (1991–2020 normals, extremes 1981–present)
Month	Jan	Feb	Mar	Apr	May	Jun	Jul	Aug	Sep	Oct	Nov	Dec	Year
Record high °C (°F)	21.2 (70.2)	28.8 (83.8)	36.3 (97.3)	34.7 (94.5)	36.8 (98.2)	37.6 (99.7)	38.5 (101.3)	38.9 (102.0)	38.8 (101.8)	33.6 (92.5)	29.7 (85.5)	23.6 (74.5)	38.9 (102.0)
Mean daily maximum °C (°F)	6.9 (44.4)	9.8 (49.6)	15.1 (59.2)	21.9 (71.4)	27.1 (80.8)	29.9 (85.8)	32.3 (90.1)	31.2 (88.2)	27.5 (81.5)	22.8 (73.0)	15.9 (60.6)	9.2 (48.6)	20.8 (69.4)
Daily mean °C (°F)	2.6 (36.7)	5.4 (41.7)	10.1 (50.2)	16.7 (62.1)	22.0 (71.6)	25.7 (78.3)	28.3 (82.9)	27.2 (81.0)	23.0 (73.4)	17.8 (64.0)	10.9 (51.6)	4.8 (40.6)	16.2 (61.2)
Mean daily minimum °C (°F)	−0.6 (30.9)	2.0 (35.6)	6.1 (43.0)	12.2 (54.0)	17.6 (63.7)	22.1 (71.8)	25.1 (77.2)	24.1 (75.4)	19.5 (67.1)	13.9 (57.0)	7.1 (44.8)	1.4 (34.5)	12.5 (54.6)
Record low °C (°F)	−12.0 (10.4)	−11.2 (11.8)	−3.6 (25.5)	0.0 (32.0)	7.1 (44.8)	12.5 (54.5)	17.2 (63.0)	15.5 (59.9)	10.0 (50.0)	2.6 (36.7)	−5.3 (22.5)	−11.4 (11.5)	−12.0 (10.4)
Average precipitation mm (inches)	34.9 (1.37)	39.5 (1.56)	66.5 (2.62)	71.1 (2.80)	85.4 (3.36)	168.4 (6.63)	209.5 (8.25)	133.0 (5.24)	78.8 (3.10)	59.0 (2.32)	53.0 (2.09)	26.7 (1.05)	1,025.8 (40.39)
Average precipitation days (≥ 0.1 mm)	7.6	8.4	9.0	8.6	9.9	9.9	11.8	11.2	8.8	7.7	7.9	6.2	107
Average snowy days	4.3	2.6	1.0	0	0	0	0	0	0	0	0.6	1.3	9.8
Average relative humidity (%)	74	73	71	70	71	76	81	82	79	73	73	72	75
Mean monthly sunshine hours	125.2	125.1	162.7	189.4	201.5	186.3	208.6	196.8	167.3	163.4	148.4	137.6	2,012.3
Percentage possible sunshine	39	40	44	48	47	44	48	48	46	47	47	44	45
Source: China Meteorological Administration

== Transportation ==
Huoqiu County has one passenger railway station, Huoqiu, on the Fuyang–Lu'an railway.

== Economy ==
Around a third of foie gras produced worldwide, or 5,000 tonnes, originates from the five million Landes geese raised in Huoqiu.
