= LHE =

LHE may refer to:

- LHE, the IATA code for Allama Iqbal International Airport, Punjab, Pakistan
- LHE, the Pinyin code for Luohe railway station, Henan, China
- LHE, the ScotRail station code for Loch Eil Outward Bound railway station, Highland, Scotland
