= Lu'an railway station =

Railway station in Lu'an, Anhui

Lu'an 六安
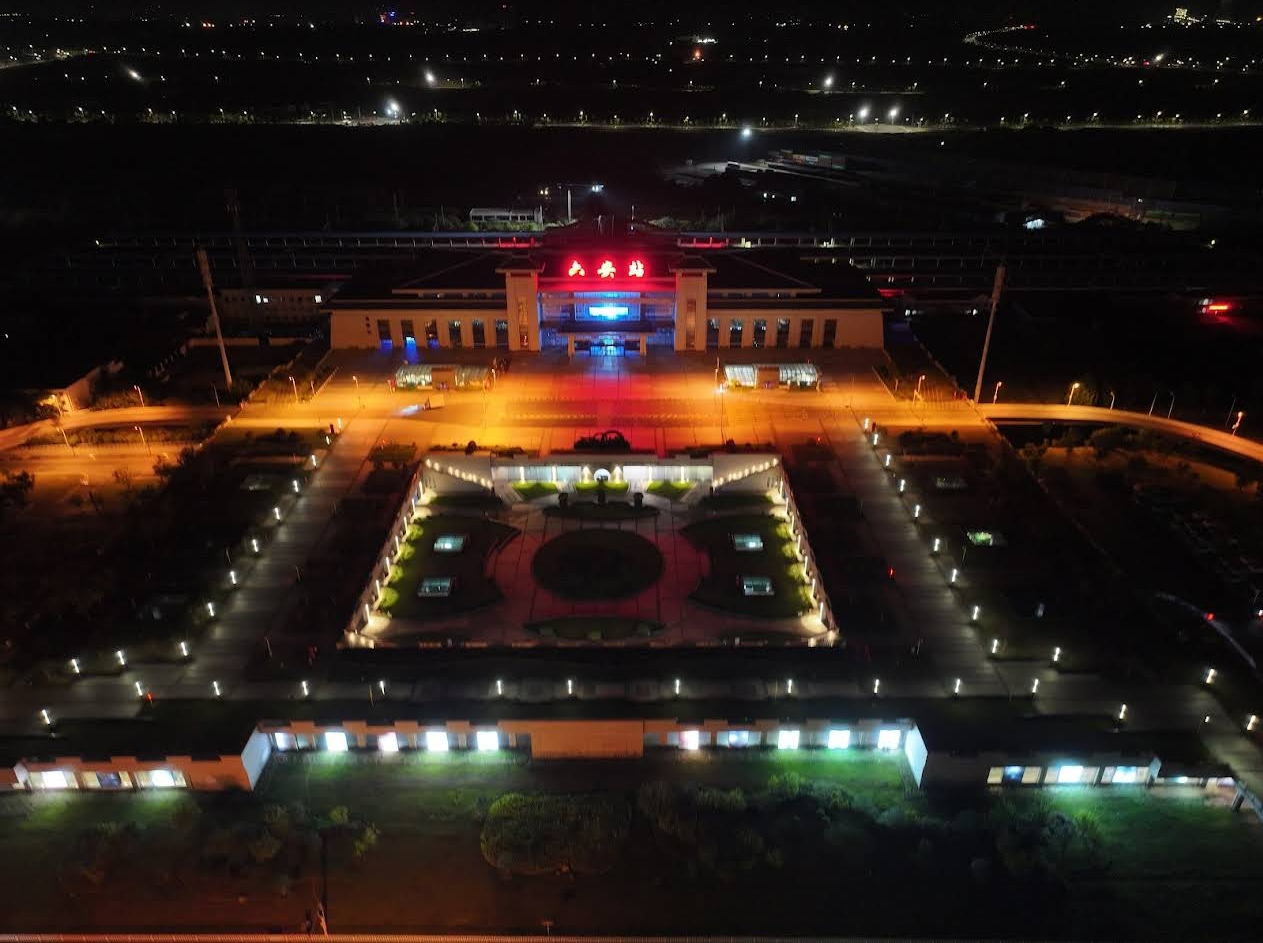

General information
- Location: Lu'an, Anhui; China
- Coordinates: 31°42′59.58″N 116°29′41.27″E
- Line(s): Hefei–Wuhan railway; Nanjing–Xi'an railway; Fuyang–Lu'an railway; Lu'an–Anqing high-speed railway (under construction)

History
- Opened: 2004
Location

Lu'an railway station (Chinese: 六安站) is located in the south of National Highway 312, Yu'an District, Lu'an City, Anhui Province, China. It was opened in 2004 and underwent expansion and renovation completed in 2018. It is a second-class station for both passenger and freight transport, administered by China Railway Shanghai Group. The station is served by the Ningxi Railway, Hewu Railway, and Fuli Railway.

== History ==
The station opened in 2004. Construction on a new, larger station building began on 10 September 2016. On 16 August 2018, the refurbished station was opened.

Preceding station	China Railway	Following station
Hefei towards Nanjing	Nanjing–Xi'an railway	Gushi towards Xi'an
Huoqiu towards Fuyang	Fuyang–Lu'an railway	Terminus
Preceding station	China Railway High-speed	Following station
Hefei South Terminus	Hefei–Wuhan railway	Jinzhai towards Hankou
