= FYH =

FYH may refer to:

- FYH, ICAO airline code for Thai airline Flyhy Cargo Airlines
- FYH, telegraph code for Fuyang railway station (Anhui), China
- FYH, song in 2013 album Three Kings (TGT album)
