= China Railway KDZ1 =

KDZ1
- Stock type: DYZ1
- Manufacturer: Changchun Railway Vehicles
- Designer: Changchun Railway Vehicles, CRRC Zhuzhou Institute, China Academy of Railway Sciences
- Assembly: Changchun, China
- Constructed: 1983-1988
- Number built: 1
- Successor: KDZ1A
- Formation: Tc-M-M-Tc
- Operators: China Railway

Specifications
- Car length: 25.500 m (83 ft 7.9 in)
- Width: 3,105 mm (10 ft 2.2 in)
- Height: 4,100 mm (13 ft 5 in)
- Maximum speed: 140 km/h (87 mph)
- Track gauge: 1,435 mm (4 ft 8 1/2 in)

The KDZ1 is the first electrical multiple unit built in China. It is an experimental alternating current electrical multiple unit, developed by Changchun Railway Vehicles, CRRC Zhuzhou Institute and China Academy of Railway Sciences in 1978 and completed in 1988, though it never saw passenger service, with it being stored after it completed its initial tests.

== Development ==
At the end of the 1970s, research had somewhat restarted after the interruption caused by the cultural revolution, with it restarted by the March 1978 National Science Congress. In accordance to the ten-year plan for railway science and technology development created by the Ministry of Railways, Changchun Railway Vehicles, CRRC Zhuzhou Institute and China Academy of Railway Sciences cooperated to create an electric multiple unit, to fulfil the needs for high-speed intercity transport, and strengthen passenger transport capacity. In May 1978, the ministry held the first conference on cooperation for developing an electrical multiple unit, requesting a train capable of moving at 160 km/h (99 mph) to be completed by the end of 1978, to allow studies the design of a bogie for high-speed trains.。

In December 1978, the railway academy, Beijing bureau, Nanjing Puzhen and Changchun Railway Vehicles completed studies on the effect of higher speeds on various bogies by hauling four Type 22 carriages with a NY5 on the Jingguang railway from Shijiazhuang to Baoding at speeds of up to 165 km/h (103 mph), becoming the highest speed achieved at the time.

In 1983, the research on the electric multiple unit was coming close to being complete, and the train entered initial production. After around a ten-year development period, the first electric multiple unit built in China was completed in September 1988, and registered as the KDZ1, a four car unit with two trailers and two motors and a design speed of 140 km/h (87.0 mph). It entered testing on the Beijing ring railway from March 1989, first in static tests then powered tests; on 7 July 1989, it achieved its maximum speed at 141 km/h (87.6 mph). On 8 August 1989, the Premier, Li Peng and various other officials visited the Beijing ring railway, and had a test ride on the KDZ1, amongst other new railway carriages.

After completing the tests, KDZ1 was planned to be transferred to Zhengzhou bureau, Baoji sector and to be used on the Longhai railway between Xian and Baoji, but due to technical reasons and the lack of preparation, this was not achieved. The train was instead transferred back to Changchun Railway Vehicles, where it has been stored since. Although it never entered service, it provided experience in development of electric multiple units, which would be used in the following KDZ1A.

== Technical specification ==
=== Overall structure ===
The KDZ1 is a four car multiple unit, with two driving trailers on either end and two motor cars in the middle. A pair of driving trailer and a motor forms a traction unit, and the train can be controlled from either end. The roof of the driving trailer is fitted with a pantograph and the circuit breakers; the bottom of the car carries the primary transformers, Gate turn-off thyristor and other various electrical control equipment; the motor cars carry the smoothing reactors, static converters and the auxiliary electrical cabinet. The roof of the motor carries the resistors for dynamic braking. Carriages are mainly built of aluminium alloys and various other weight saving materials and the carriages are connected with tightlock coupers. All four carriages were hard seat cars in a two by three layout, with the driving carriages having a lower capacity at 88 people, compared to 103 in the motor cars.

=== Set composition ===
| Position | 1 | 2 | 3 | 4 |
| Registration | DYZ_{1} 0001 | DYZ_{1} 0002 | DYZ_{1} 0003 | DYZ_{1} 0004 |
| Type | 'electric' hard seat | | | |
| Traction | 〇〇 〇〇 trailer | ●● ●● motor | | 〇〇 〇〇 trailer |
| Traction unit | ① | | ② | |
| Occupancy | 88 | 103 | 103 | 88 |
| Notes | driver's cabin pantograph | | | driver's cabin pantograph |

== See also ==
- Dongfeng DMU - first generation DMU
- Juche-class EMU - first generation EMU developed in similar era and with similar maximum speed
