= China Railway KDZ1A =

KDZ1A "Chuncheng"
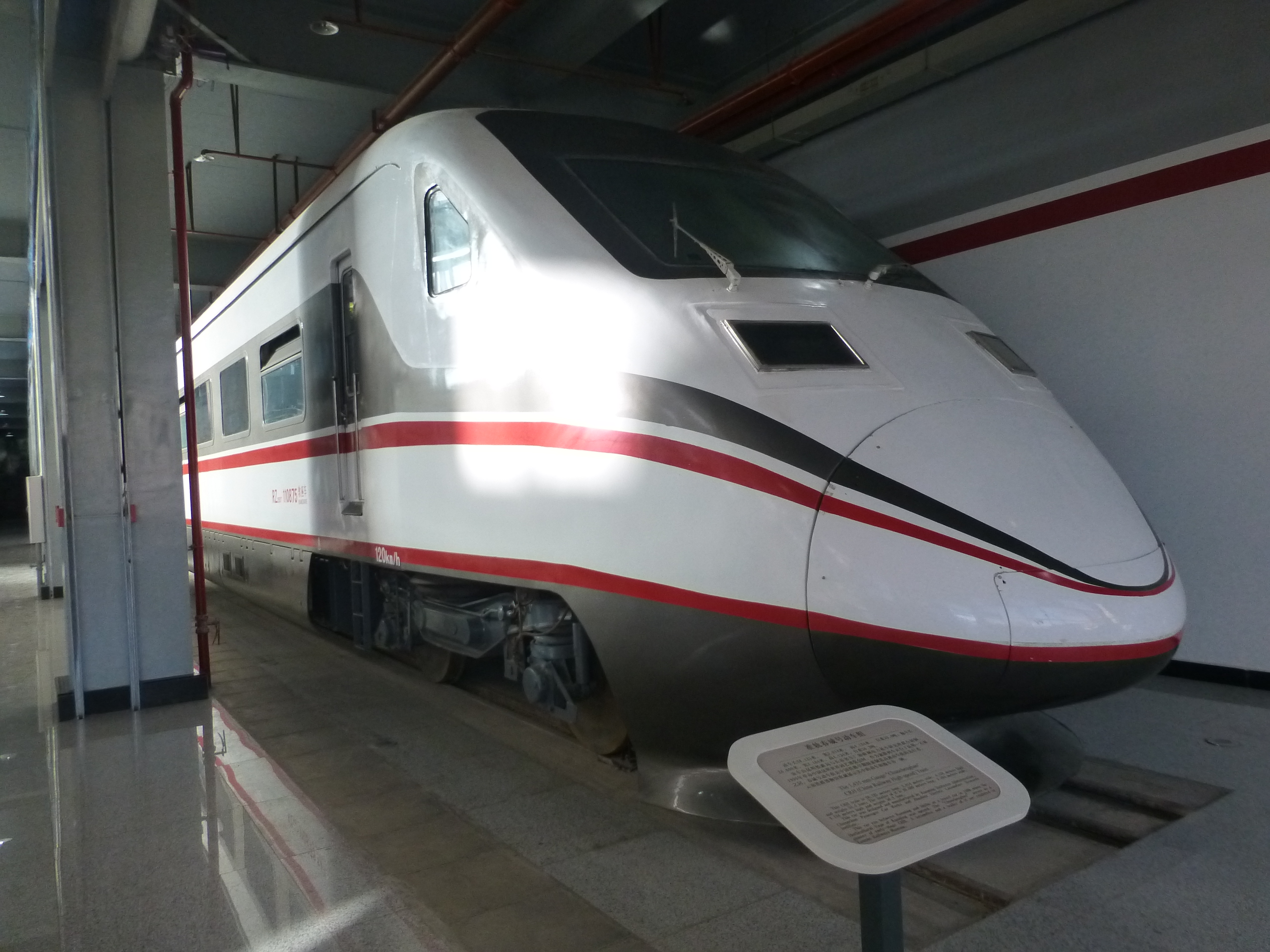
- One of the driving trailer carriages, now preserved in the Yunnan Railway Museum
- In service: 1999-2009
- Manufacturer: Changchun Railway Vehicles
- Designer: Changchun Railway Vehicles, Zhuzhou Institute, Zhuzhou Electric Locomotive
- Assembly: Changchun, China
- Constructed: 1999
- Number built: 1 set
- Number in service: 0
- Number preserved: 1 motor, 1 trailer
- Predecessor: KDZ1
- Successor: DJF1
- Formation: Tc-M-T-M-M-Tc
- Capacity: 600
- Operators: Kunming bureau

Specifications
- Car length: 25.77 m (84 ft 7 in) (driving trailer); 25.5 m (83 ft 8 in) (other cars)
- Width: 3,105 mm (10 ft 2.2 in)
- Height: 4,134 mm (13 ft 6.8 in)
- Maximum speed: 132 km/h (82 mph) (tests)
- Traction motors: DS-112A
- Tractive effort: 2160 kW
- Transmission: AC–DC
- Power supply: single phase 25 kV AC
- Bogies: CW-200

The KDZ1A "Chuncheng" was an early attempt at building an electric multiple unit in China with the participation of Changchun Railway Vehicles, Zhuzhou Institute and Kunming railway bureau. Development was completed in 1999 in time for the Kunming World Horticultural Exposition. As its predecessor, the KDZ1 never operated commercially, the KDZ1A became the first Chinese EMU to be in revenue service, although it was in service for only 10 years before being withdrawn.

== Development history ==
=== Development ===
In 1988, the first Chinese EMU, the KDZ1 was completed at Changchun Railway Vehicles. It had a maximum operating speed of 140 km/h (87 mph), but due to immature technologies, it never entered service. The interest in EMUs arose again towards the end of the 1990s, with the catalyst being the 1999 World Horticultural Exposition, where it was realised that there was a need for short distance transport from Kunming to other nearby cities. For this, Kunming bureau invested CN¥16,800,000 to construct an EMU, signing a contract on 7 August 1998 with Changchun Railway Vehicles and Zhuzhou Institute. The new model was named the KDZ1A, to represent the fact that it was supposed to be a further development on the KDZ1. The exterior and interior design was done by Changchun Railway vehicles, while Zhuzhou Electric Locomotive designed the electrical systems.

The KDZ1A was rolled out in March 1999, and sent to Beijing ring railway for tests, where it reached a maximum speed of 132 km/h (82 mph). The tests were completed on 11 April, and it was formally assigned to Kunming bureau.

=== Operation ===
On 16 April 1999, days before the opening of the exposition, the KDZ1A participated in a ribbon cutting ceremony at Kunming station, and subsequently departed on service K439/440 from Kunming to Shiling, and thus becoming the first commercially operated EMU in China, but was also the first streamlined EMU built. As the KDZ1A took only eight months from design to completion with a short testing period, its commercial service revealed numerous flaws, mostly relating to the electrical, transmission and ventilation systems that were only solved after the problems were identified in passenger service.

During the period of the Horticultural Exposition, there was a great demand for the service, and every trip ran at maximum occupancy. However, after the exposition ended, demand sharply decreased, with only 30 or 40 passengers per trip. As a result of the decline, service K439/440 was cancelled and the KDZ1A stopped operating. It subsequently ran other services from Kunming to Xuanwei and from 2006, services 5651/2/3/4 from Kunming to Chuxiong.

In April 2007, the section Zhanyi to Kunming on the Hukun railway was completed after duplication, and to use the extra capacity provided, Kunming bureau added more services within its area. The KDZ1A was put to use on the line from 1 June 2007, running between Kunming and Qujing on services T901/2 and T903/4, taking 106 minutes for the trip. However, due to limitations imposed by the neutral sections of the rail line, the KDZ1A was reduced to a four car formation with two motors and two trailers, lowering capacity to 372 people. This was solved in August 2007, after modifications to the electrical systems permitted the operation of it as a six car set.

From 2009 onwards, the KDZ1A was withdrawn and stored at Guangtong sector, while a spare driving trailer was stored at Kunming sector. Since then, a driving trailer and a motor has been on display at the Hunan Railway Museum, while the other five cars including the spare driving trailer are still stored.

== Technical specifications ==
=== Overall structure ===
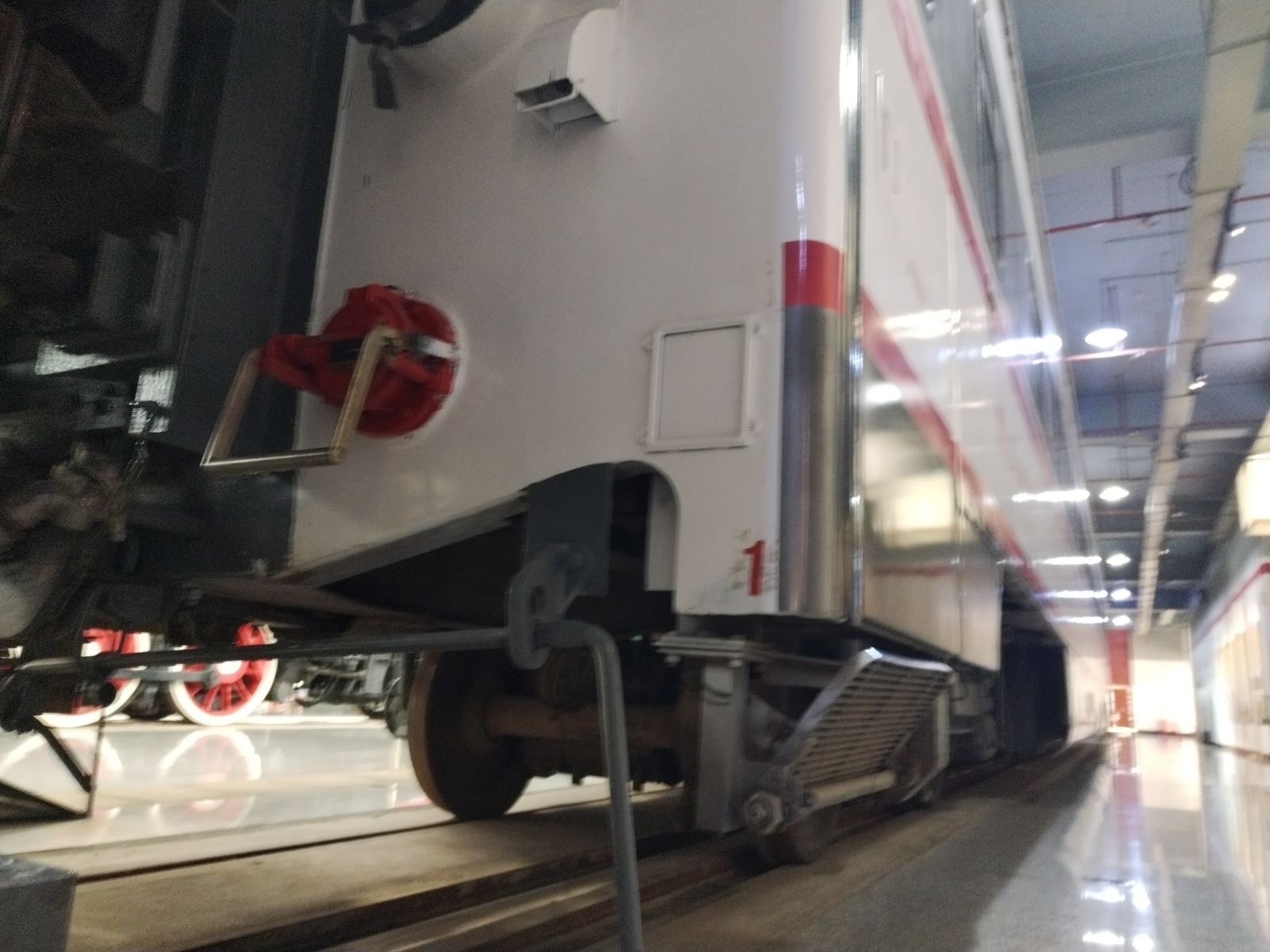
KDZ1A Boogey shot

The KDZ1A is a six car EMU, with three trailers and three motor carriages. Each pair of motor carriage and trailer forms a traction unit, and the whole train has a traction output of 2160 kW. Various equipment placed on the roof include the pantograph, primary circuit breaker, lightning protection devices and resistors for dynamic braking, while the bottom of the carriage has the primary transformers, primary rectifiers and secondary inverters. The motor car in the second traction unit carries the flat wave inductor and secondary inverters. After the modifications to allow it to run on the upgraded Hukun railway, the pantograph on the second traction unit was removed, while an additional 25 kV cable was added between the carriages, to allow all three traction units to be fed from one pantograph.

The carriages are of a sparless steel design, connected to each by a size 15 coupler. To improve airflow, skirts are installed under carriages. It has a full capacity of 600 people, consisting two soft seat carriages arranged in two by two arrangement, with a capacity of 64 and four hard seat carriages in a two by three layout and a capacity 116 people. The set uses a Japanese NABCO controller, to allow for simultaneous air and dynamic braking.

The KDZ1A weights 381 tons in total, while the axle weight of the motor cars are equal or less than 18 tons.

=== Transmission ===
The KDZ1A has an AC–DC transmission, where the single phase 25 kV AC from the overhead line passes through the primary transformer then a thyristor rectifier, which then passes to the four traction motors within the same traction unit. The traction motors are model DS-112A DC motor with a continuous output of 180 kW.

=== Control systems ===
The control system of the KDZ1A is based on that of the SS8, with every traction unit having a cabinet for microcomputers. Microcomputers control the electrical transmission, such as the traction, braking, anti-slip but also train heating. The driver's console has a TFT display, which can provide error diagnosis. However, as domestic technology was immature and a train communication network had yet to be developed, the train used a modified version of the program of the articulated SS4B, using a RS-485 standard train control line to communicate between traction units. However, control information was not actually transmitted over the cable, only the status of the train was. This was a problematic design, as on the SS4B, the RS-485 cable connected two locomotives that were next to each other, while the cable for the KDZ1A had to span the entire train, leading to it suffering from electromagnetic interference.

=== Bogie ===
Each carriage had two bogies, which were the Changchun Railway Vehicles model CW-200 bolsterless high-speed bogie. It is a welded bogie, in the shape of the letter H. First stage suspension are springs with hydraulic shock absorber, with horizontal dampers and anti-roll bars fitted between the carriage body and the bogie. Motorised bogies are fitted with shoe brakes and parking brakes, while trailers use disc brakes. Both types are fitted with electronic anti-slip systems.

=== Set composition ===
Carriage number	1	2	3	4	5	6
Type	RZ_{25DT}	YZ_{25DD}	YZ_{25DT}	YZ_{25DD}		RZ_{25DT}
Type	soft seat	hard seat				soft seat
Traction configuration	〇〇 〇〇 trailer	●● ●● motor	〇〇 〇〇 trailer	●● ●● motor		〇〇 〇〇 trailer
Traction unit	①		②		③	
Occupancy	64	116				64
Notes	driver's cabin pantograph		pantograph			driver's cabin pantograph

== See also ==
- KDZ1 - predecessor, first EMU built in China
- DDJ1 - first power concentrated EMU built in China
