= ZDN =

ZDN may refer to:

- ZDN, the Beijing–Guangzhou railway station code for Zhumadian railway station, Henan, China
- ZDN, the Ministry of Railways station code for Zahedan railway station, Iran
