= Huoqiu railway station =

Railway station in Lu'an, Anhui

Huoqiu 霍邱

General information
- Location: Huoqiu County, Lu'an, Anhui; China
- Coordinates: 32°3′22.11″N 116°8′14.72″E
- Line(s): Fuyang–Lu'an railway
- Platforms: 2

History
- Opened: 6 July 2014

Huoqiu railway station (Chinese: 霍邱站) is a railway station in Huoqiu County, Lu'an, Anhui, China. It is an intermediate station on the Fuyang–Lu'an railway. It opened on 2 July 2014.

Preceding station	China Railway	Following station
Fuyang Terminus	Fuyang–Lu'an railway	Lu'an Terminus
