= Huayuan railway station =

Railway station in Xiaogan, China

Huayuan Railway Station 花园站
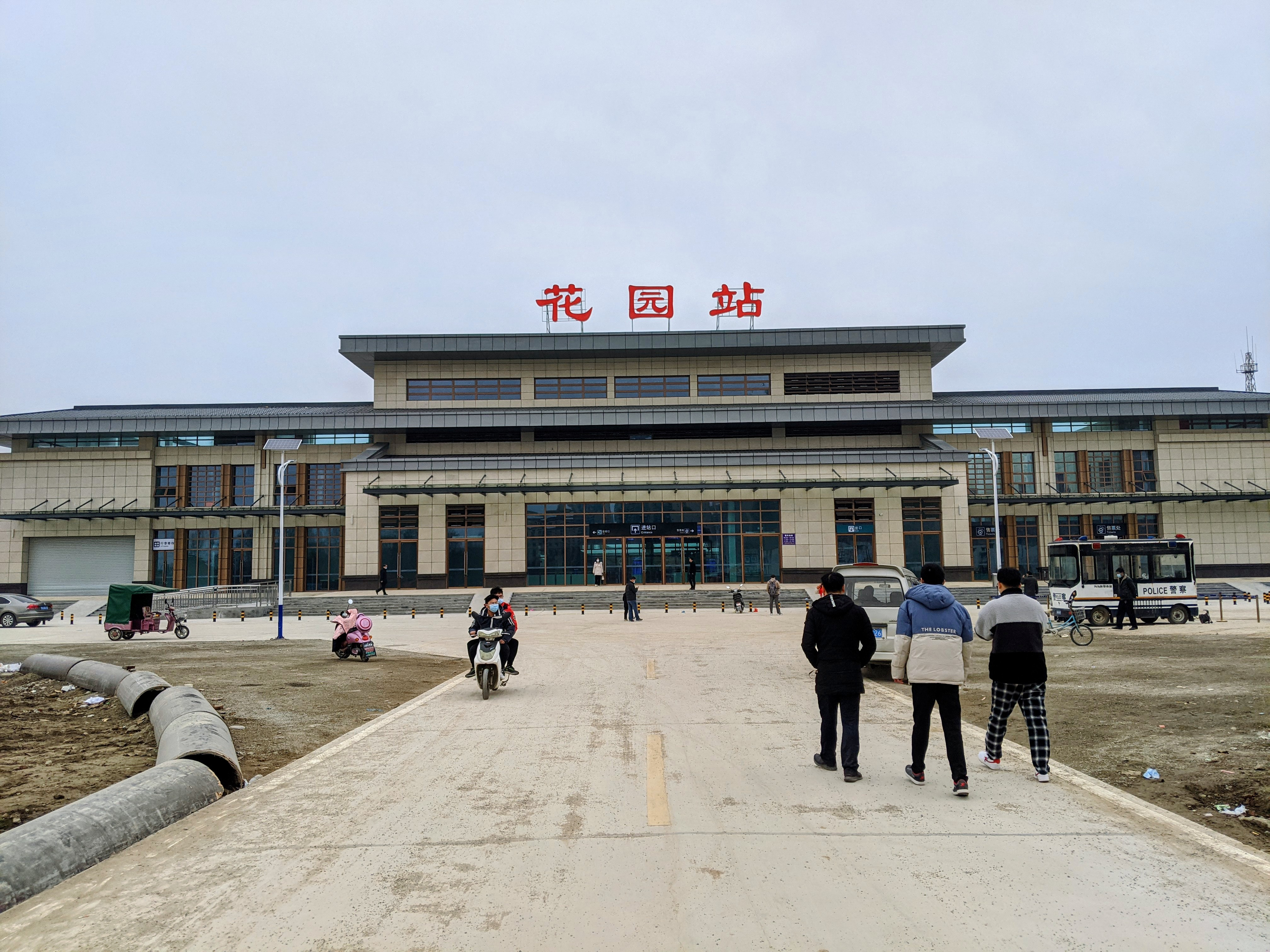
- Huayuan Railway Station (Feb 2021)

General information
- Location: Huayuan Town, Xiaochang County, Xiaogan, Hubei; China
- Coordinates: 31.2426868°N 113.9769684°E
- Operator: CR Wuhan
- Line: Beijing–Guangzhou railway
- Platforms: 3 (1 side platform and 1 island platforms)
- Tracks: 7

Construction
- Accessible: Yes

Other information
- Station code: 20981 (TMIS code); HUN (telegraph code); HYU (Pinyin code)
- Classification: Class 3 station (三等站)

History
- Opened: 1902; 124 years ago

Services
Preceding station	China Railway	Following station
Guangshui towards Beijing or Beijing West	Beijing–Guangzhou railway	Xiaogan towards Guangzhou
Location
- Location within Hubei Location within China

Huayuan railway station (Chinese: 花园站) is a station on Beijing–Guangzhou railway in Xiaochang County, Xiaogan, Hubei.

== History ==
The station was established in 1902.
