= Chalu, Anhui =

Chalu 岔路镇
- Town
- Location in China
- Coordinates: 32°8′21″N 116°12′52″E
- Country: People's Republic of China
- Province: Anhui
- Prefecture-level city: Lu'an
- County: Huoqiu County
- Time zone: UTC+8 (China Standard)

Chalu (Chinese: 岔路; pinyin: Chàlù) is a town under the administration of Huoqiu County, Anhui, China. As of 2020, it administers Chalu Residential Community and the following 11 villages:

- Chalu Village
- Wolongji Village (卧龙集村)
- Tiantang Village (天堂村)
- Caolou Village (草楼村)
- Xinglou Village (邢楼村)
- Zhoudian Village (周店村)
- Shuilou Village (水楼村)
- Hongcheng Village (洪城村)
- Gongtong Village (共同村)
- Yuanwei Village (元圩村)
- Lianhuasi Village (莲花寺村)
