= Lu'an–Anqing high-speed railway =

High-speed rail line in China

Lu'an–Anqing high-speed railway 六庆铁路

Overview
- Status: Under construction
- Termini: Lu'an; Anqing West

Service
- Operator: China Railway High-speed

Technical
- Line length: 168 km (104 mi)
- Track gauge: 1,435 mm (4 ft 8 1/2 in)
- Operating speed: 250 km/h (155 mph)

The Lu'an–Anqing high-speed railway is a high-speed rail line in China. It will be 168 kilometres (104 mi) long and have a top speed of 250 kilometres per hour (160 mph). Construction started on 30 December 2020.

== Stations ==
- Lu'an (connection with the Hefei–Wuhan railway and Nanjing–Xi'an railway)
- Huoshan
- Huangwei
- Yuexi
- Qianshan (formerly known as Qianshan South)
- Anqing West (connection with the Hefei–Anqing–Jiujiang high-speed railway)
