= Linying railway station =

Railway station in Luohe, China

Linying 临颍

General information
- Location: 117 Tiedong Road; Linying County, Luohe, Henan; China
- Coordinates: 33°48′29″N 113°54′51″E
- Operator: CR Zhengzhou
- Line: Beijing–Guangzhou railway
- Distance: Beijing–Guangzhou railway: 811 kilometres (504 mi) from Beijing West; 1,493 kilometres (928 mi) from Guangzhou
- Platforms: 3 (1 side platform and 1 island platform)
- Tracks: 6

Other information
- Station code: 20807 (TMIS code); LNF (telegraph code); LYI (Pinyin code)
- Classification: Class 3 station (三等站)

History
- Opened: 1904; 122 years ago

Services
Preceding station	China Railway	Following station
Xuchang towards Beijing West	Beijing–Guangzhou railway	Luohe towards Guangzhou
Location
- Location within Henan Location within China

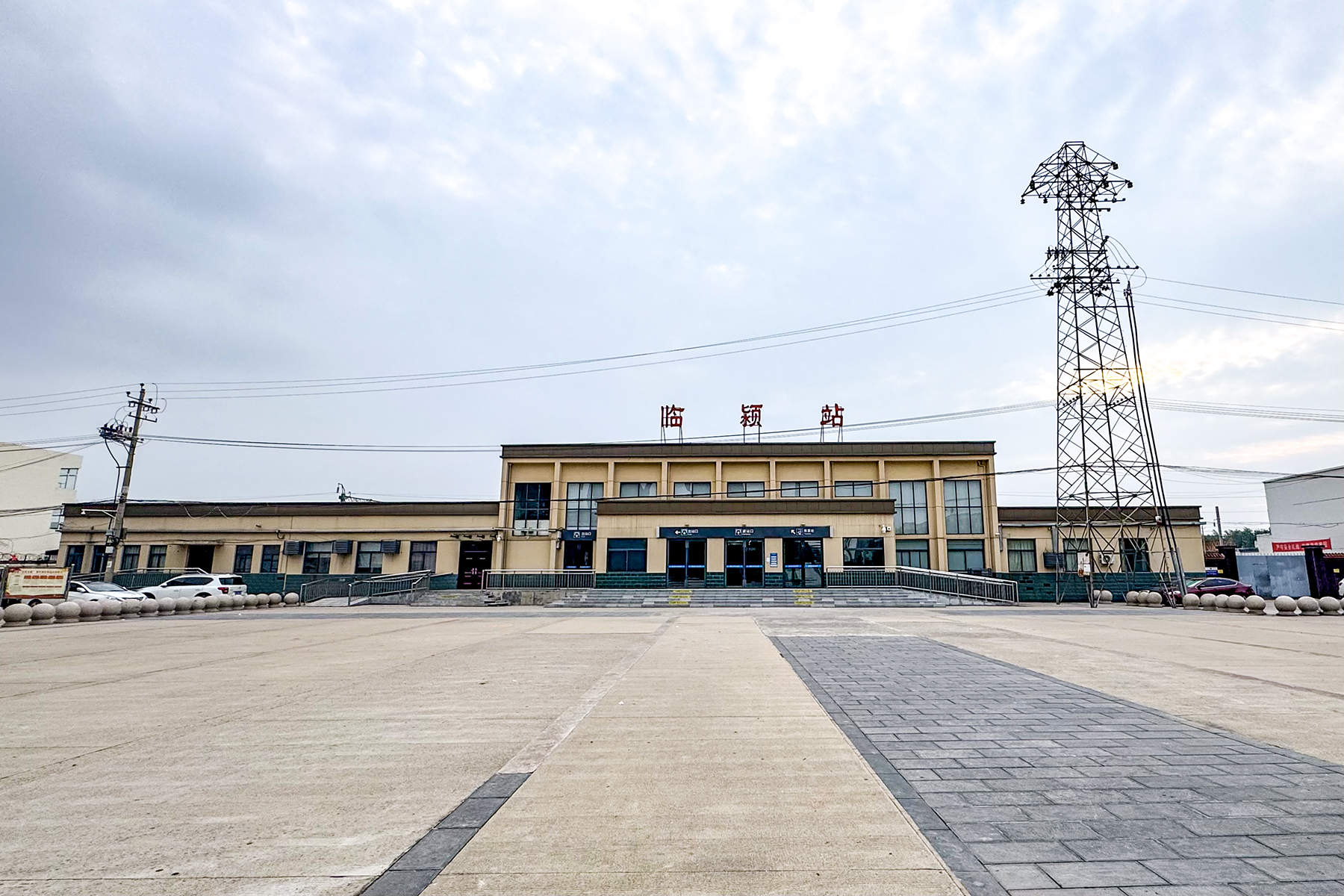

Linying railway station (Chinese: 临颍站) is a station on Beijing–Guangzhou railway in Linying County, Luohe, Henan.

== History ==
The station was established in 1904.
