= Changge railway station =

Railway station in Xuchang, China

Changge 长葛
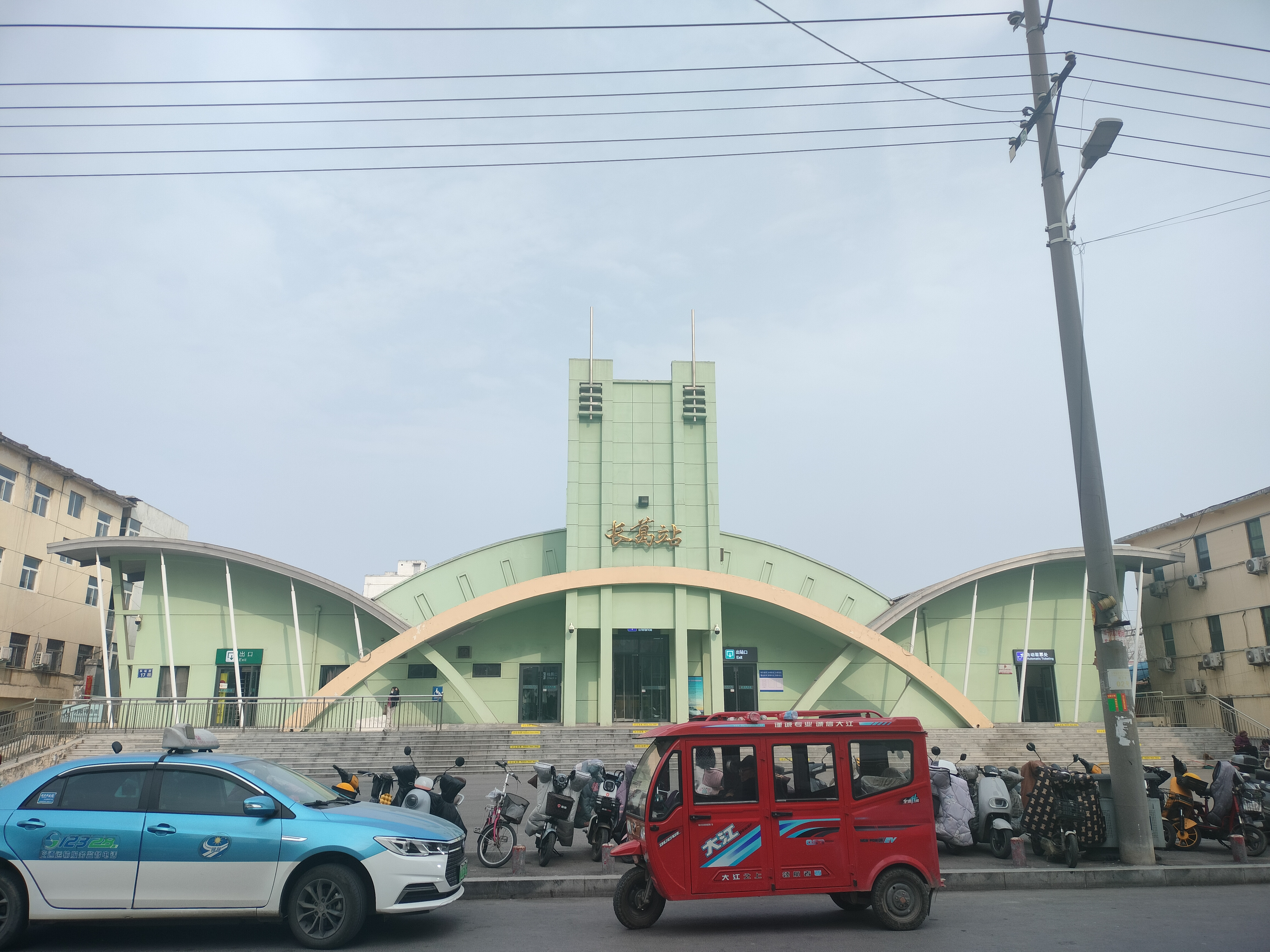

General information
- Location: 103 Chezhan Street; Changge, Xuchang, Henan; China
- Coordinates: 34.2151°N 113.7728°E
- Operator: CR Zhengzhou
- Line: Beijing–Guangzhou railway
- Platforms: 3 (1 side platform and 1 island platform)
- Tracks: 7
- Connections: Bus terminal

Other information
- Station code: 20786 (TMIS code); CEF (telegraph code); CGE (Pinyin code)
- Classification: Class 3 station (三等站)

History
- Opened: 1904; 122 years ago
- Former names: Heshangqiao (Chinese: 和尚桥)

Services
| Preceding station | China Railway | Following station |
|---|---|---|
| Zhengzhou towards Beijing West | Beijing–Guangzhou railway | Xuchang towards Guangzhou |
Location
- Location within Henan Location within China

Changge railway station (Chinese: 长葛站) is a station on the Beijing–Guangzhou railway in Changge, Xuchang, Henan, China.

== History ==
The station was opened in 1904.
