= Guangshui railway station =

Railway station in Suizhou, China

Guangshui 广水
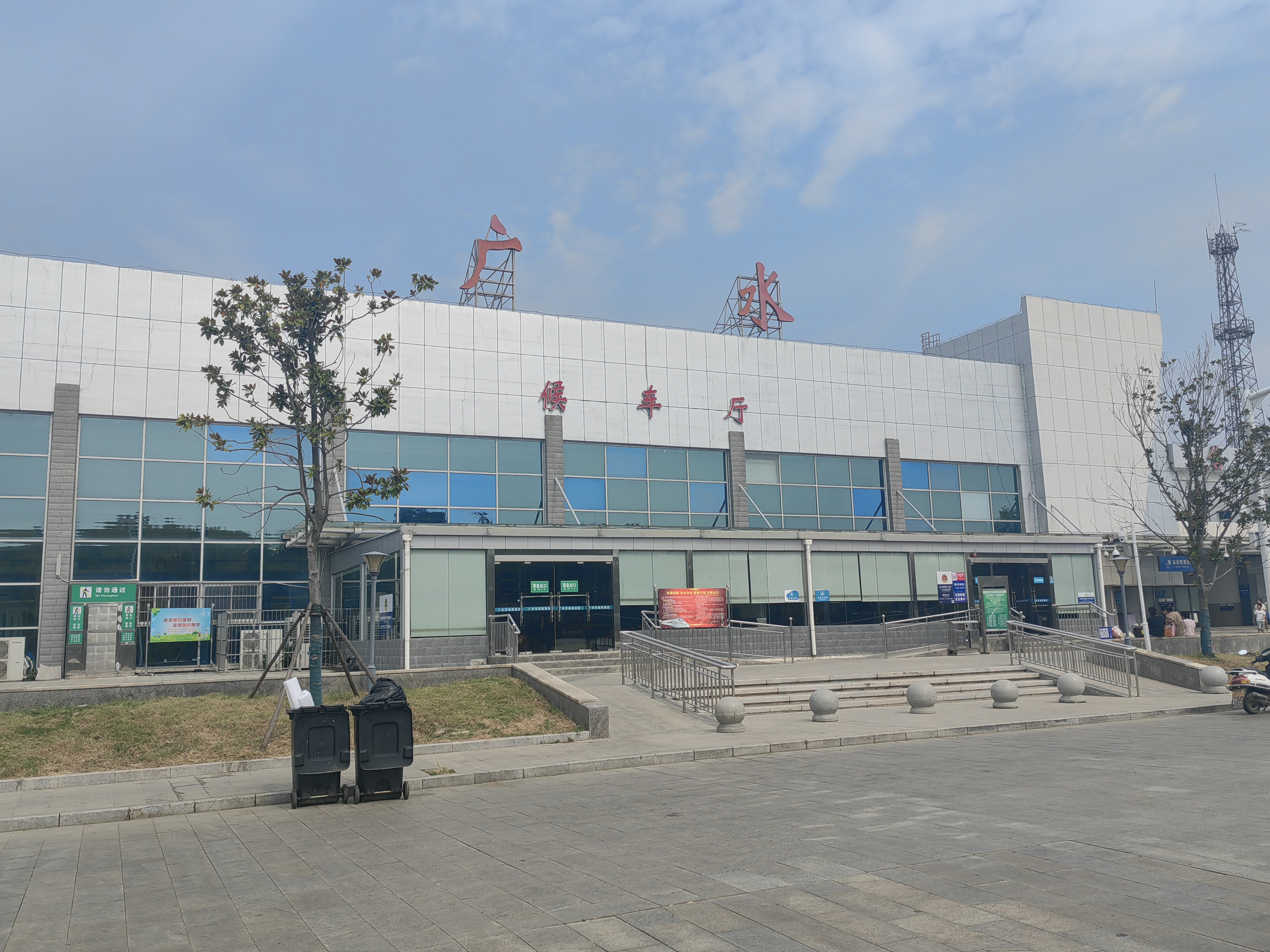
- Guangshui railway station

General information
- Location: Wushengguan, Guangshui, Suizhou, Hubei; China
- Coordinates: 31.6316513°N 114.0366396°E
- Operator: CR Wuhan
- Line: Beijing–Guangzhou railway
- Platforms: 3 (1 side platform and 1 island platforms)
- Tracks: 5

Other information
- Station code: 20948 (TMIS code); GSN (telegraph code); GSH (Pinyin code)
- Classification: Class 3 station (三等站)

History
- Opened: 26 March 2007; 19 years ago

Services
Preceding station	China Railway	Following station
Xinyang towards Beijing or Beijing West	Beijing–Guangzhou railway	Huayuan towards Guangzhou
Location
- Location within Hubei Location within China

Guangshui railway station (Chinese: 广水站) is a station on Beijing–Guangzhou railway in Guangshui, Suizhou, Hubei.

== History ==
The former Guangshui railway station was established in 1902. In 2007, the section of Beijing–Guangzhou railway near the border between Henan and Hubei was diverted to a more straight route in order to meet the requirements of the sixth "Speed-Up" campaign of China Railway and the current station was built along the new route. The former Guangshui railway station was renamed as Guangshuixi railway station (Chinese: 广水西站).
