= Qinglongshan–Fuyang railway =

Railroad line in Anhui, China

Overview
- Status: Operational
- Stations: 1 passenger station

Service
- Type: Heavy rail

History
- Opened: June 1970

Technical
- Line length: 132.3 km (82 mi)
- Track gauge: 1,435 mm (4 ft 8 1/2 in) standard gauge
- Electrification: 50 Hz 25,000 V

The Qinglongshan–Fuyang railway is a passenger and freight railway line in China. Its southern terminus is Fuyang which is on the Beijing–Kowloon railway, Luohe–Fuyang railway, and Fuyang–Huainan railway. The northern terminus is Qinglongshan, a freight-only station on the Fuliji–Jiahezhai railway.

== History ==
The line opened in July 1970 and was built primarily for the transportation of coal.

The section between Tianqimiao and Qingting was double-tracked between November 2006 and April 2007. The whole line is now double-track.

Electrification of the line began in April 2015 and was completed in January 2019.
