= Xiaogan railway station =

Railway station in Xiaogan, China

Xiaogan 孝感

General information
- Location: Xiaonan District, Xiaogan, Hubei; China
- Coordinates: 30.955221°N 113.929531°E
- Operator: CR Wuhan
- Line: Beijing–Guangzhou railway
- Platforms: 5 (1 side platform and 2 island platforms)
- Tracks: 7

Other information
- Station code: 20990 (TMIS code); XGN (telegraph code); XGA (Pinyin code)
- Classification: Class 2 station (二等站)

History
- Opened: 1901; 125 years ago

Services
Preceding station	China Railway	Following station
Huayuan towards Beijing or Beijing West	Beijing–Guangzhou railway	Wuchang towards Guangzhou
Location
- Location within Hubei Location within China

Xiaogan railway station (Chinese: 孝感站) is a station on Beijing–Guangzhou railway in Xiaonan District, Xiaogan, Hubei.

== History ==
The station was established in 1901.

== See also ==
- Xiaogan North railway station
- Xiaogan East railway station
