= Madian, Anhui =

Madian 马店镇
- Town
- Location in China
- Coordinates: 32°16′22″N 115°58′20″E
- Country: People's Republic of China
- Province: Anhui
- Prefecture-level city: Lu'an
- County: Huoqiu County
- Time zone: UTC+8 (China Standard)

Madian (simplified Chinese: 马店; traditional Chinese: 馬店; pinyin: Mǎdiàn) is a town under the administration of Huoqiu County, Anhui, China. As of 2018, it has 12 villages under its administration.
