= Juling =

Juling 巨陵镇
- Town
- Location in Henan
- Coordinates: 33°51′46″N 113°57′41″E
- Country: People's Republic of China
- Province: Henan
- Prefecture-level city: Luohe
- County: Linying County
- Time zone: UTC+8 (China Standard)

Juling (Chinese: 巨陵; pinyin: Jùlíng) is a town in Linying County, Henan province, China. As of 2020, it has 26 villages under its administration:

- Juling Village
- Liuzhuang Village (刘庄村)
- Zhangzhuang Village (张庄村)
- Mengzhuang Village (孟庄村)
- Louzhuang Village (娄庄村)
- Youfangchen Village (油坊陈村)
- Lizhuang Village (李庄村)
- Fangcheliu Village (纺车刘村)
- Hanzhuang Village (韩庄村)
- Shiyuanwang Village (柿元王村)
- Taizhuang Village (邰庄村)
- Liangli Village (梁李村)
- Yanglin Village (杨林村)
- Daduan Village (大段村)
- Wulukou Village (武路口村)
- Wujiqiao Village (伍极桥村)
- Wangzhuang Village (王庄村)
- Huanlong Village (豢龙村)
- Panzhuang Village (潘庄村)
- Guaizili Village (拐子李村)
- Mamiao Village (马庙村)
- Guanjie Village (观街村)
- Yingwang Village (英王村)
- Qizhuang Village (齐庄村)
- Laimaizhang Village (来脉张村)
- Luoshanxin Village (罗山新村)

== See also ==
- List of township-level divisions of Henan
