= Xinyang railway station =

Railway station in Xinyang, Henan, China

Xinyang 信阳
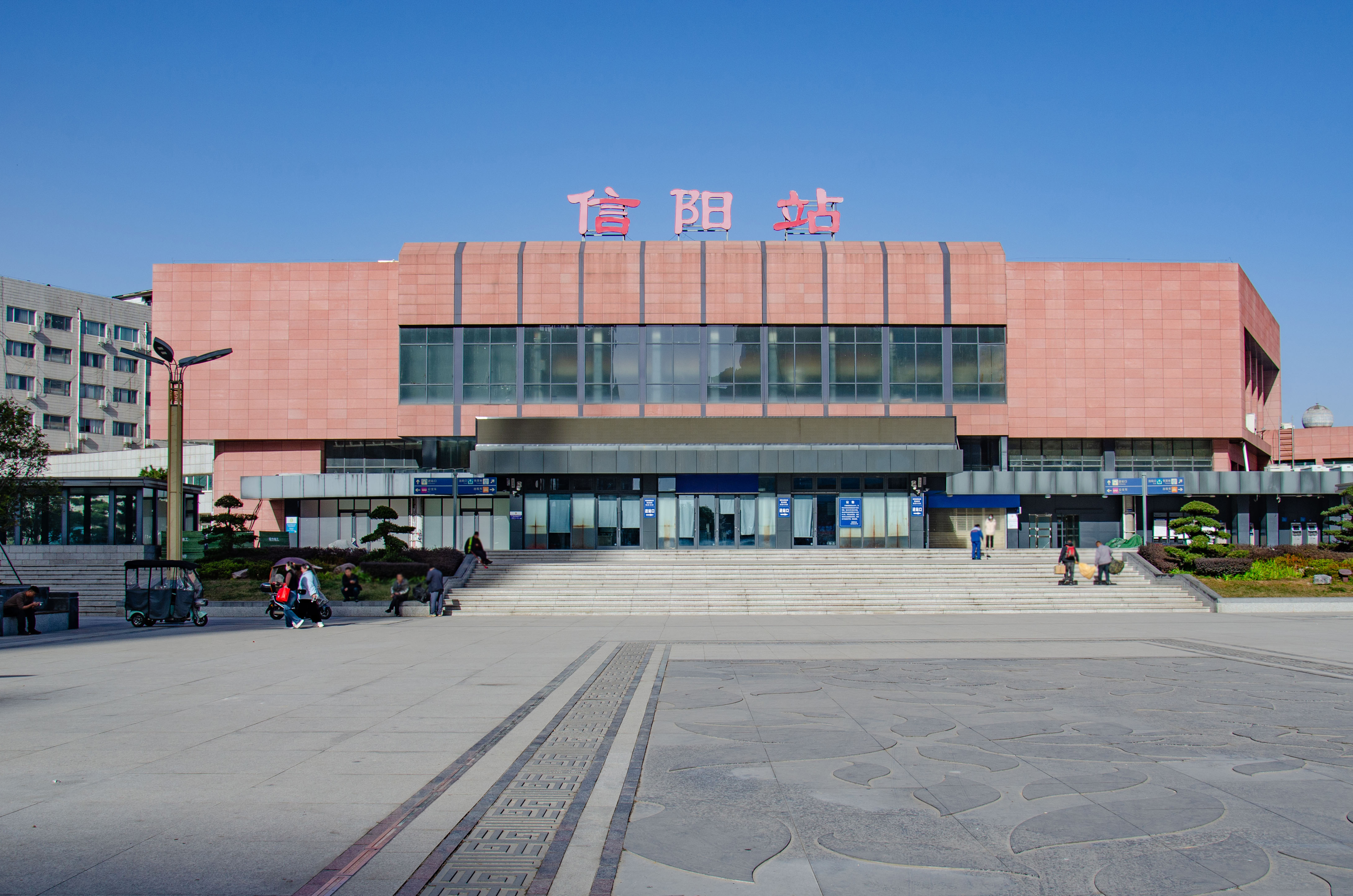
- Station building in 2025

General information
- Location: Shihe District, Xinyang, Henan; China
- Coordinates: 32°07′51″N 114°04′34″E
- Operator: CR Wuhan
- Lines: Beijing–Guangzhou railway; Nanjing–Xi'an railway
- Platforms: 5 (1 side platform and 2 island platforms)
- Tracks: 9

Other information
- Station code: 20903 (TMIS code); XUN (telegraph code); XYA (Pinyin code)
- Classification: Class 1 station (一等站)

History
- Opened: 1902; 124 years ago

Services
Preceding station	China Railway	Following station
Minggang towards Beijing or Beijing West	Beijing–Guangzhou railway	Guangshui towards Guangzhou
Luoshan towards Nanjing	Nanjing–Xi'an railway	Tongbai towards Xi'an
Location
- Location within Henan Location within China

Xinyang railway station (Chinese: 信阳站) is a station on Beijing–Guangzhou railway and Nanjing–Xi'an railway in Shihe District, Xinyang, Henan.

== History ==
The station was established in 1902 and is the station with the longest operation history on Beijing–Hankou section of Beijing–Guangzhou railway.
