= Xuchang railway station =

Railway station in Xuchang, China

Xuchang 许昌
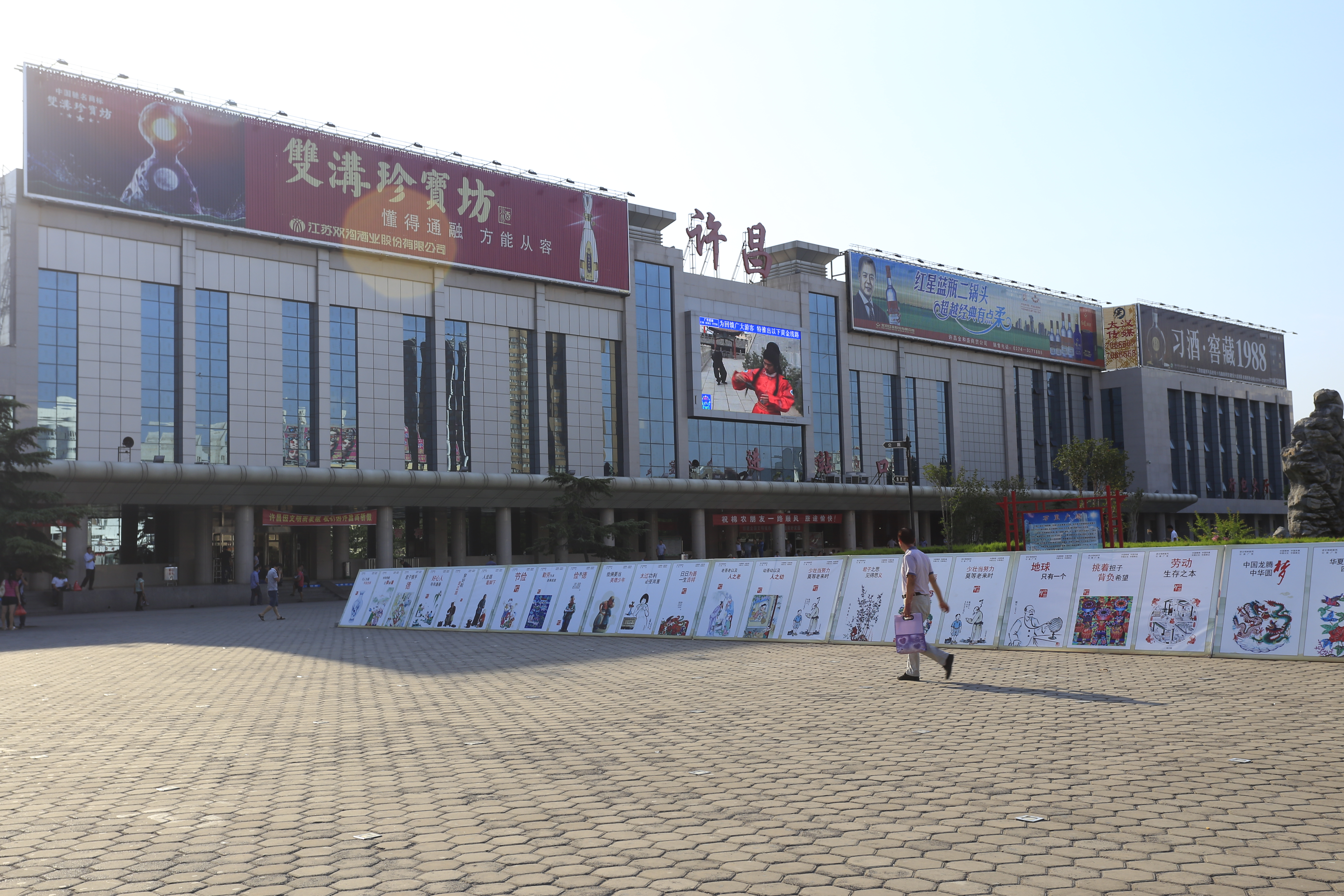

General information
- Location: 2 Chezhan Road; Weidu District, Xuchang, Henan; China
- Coordinates: 34.0204°N 113.8145°E
- Operator: CR Zhengzhou
- Line: Beijing–Guangzhou railway
- Platforms: 3 (1 side platform and 1 island platform)
- Tracks: 10
- Connections: Bus terminal

Other information
- Station code: 20792 (TMIS code); XCF (telegraph code); XCH (Pinyin code)
- Classification: Class 1 station (一等站)

History
- Opened: 1905; 121 years ago

Services
Preceding station	China Railway	Following station
Changge towards Beijing West	Beijing–Guangzhou railway	Linying towards Guangzhou
Location
- Location within Henan Location within China

Xuchang railway station (Chinese: 许昌站) is a station on Beijing–Guangzhou railway in Xuchang, Henan.

== History ==
Construction of the station started in May 1903 and the station was opened in December 1905. The station was renovated during 1988-2000.

== Station layout ==
The station has 3 platforms (1 side platform and 1 island platform) and 10 tracks. The station building, which houses the waiting rooms, ticket office and stores, is located on the east side. The island platform (Platform 2) is connected to the station building by a footbridge for entering the platform and a tunnel for leaving it. To the west of the platforms is the freight yard.

== See also ==
- Xuchang East railway station
