= Xiaoshangqiao =

Coordinates: 33°43′N 113°58′E

Xiaoshangqiao is a place in Henan, China. It is approximately 144 hectares. It was constructed in the late Erligang period and rediscovered in the 1990s.
