= Fuyang railway station (Anhui) =

Railway station in Fuyang, Anhui, China

Fuyang 阜阳
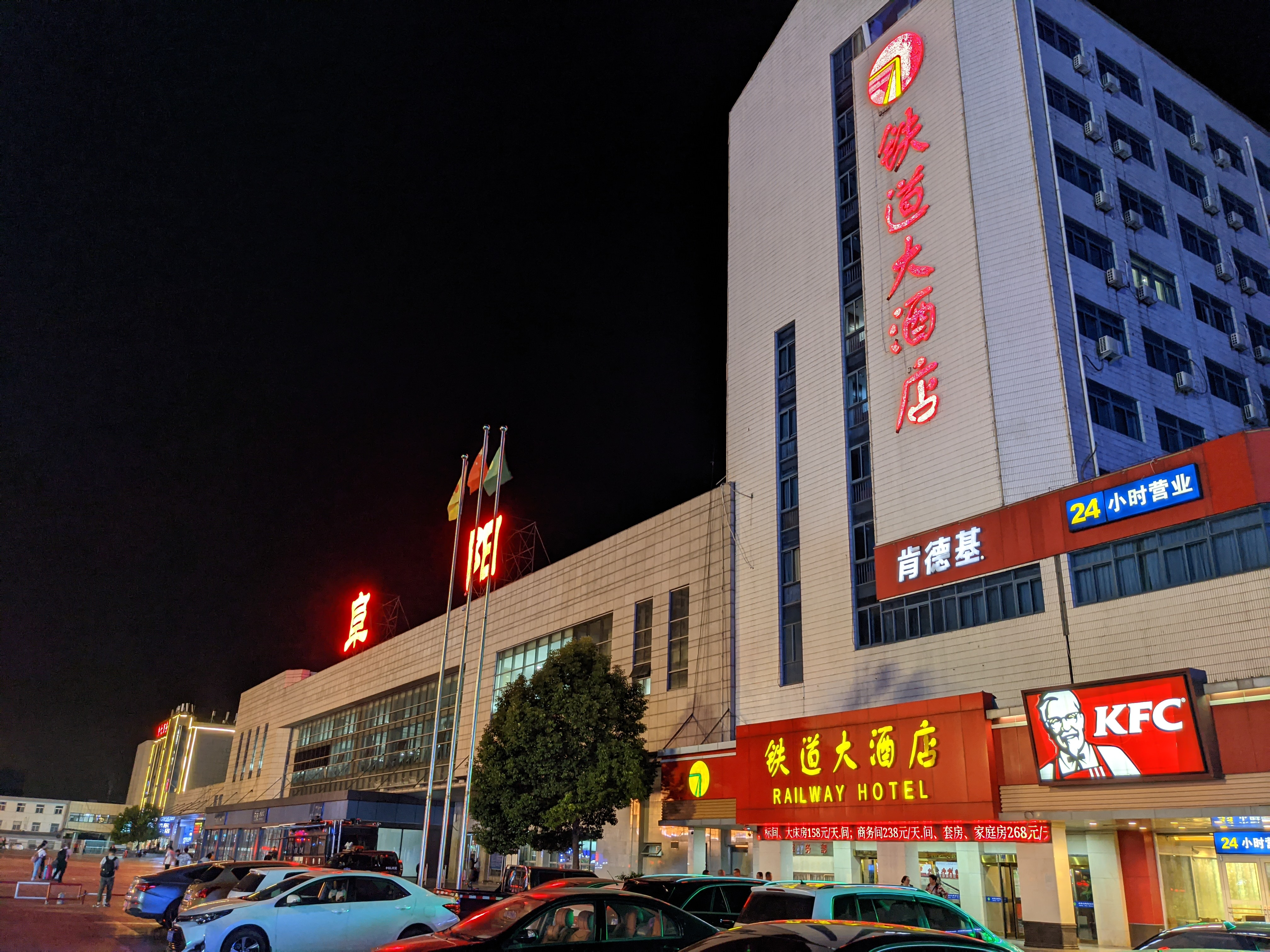
- The station building

General information
- Location: Xiangyang Subdistrict, Yingdong District, Fuyang, Anhui; China
- Coordinates: 32.916111°N 115.863889°E
- Operator: CR Shanghai
- Lines: Jingjiu; Fuhuai railway; Luofu railway; Qingfu railway; Fulu railway
- Platforms: 5

Other information
- Station code: 25104 (TMIS code); FYH (telegraph code); FYA (Pinyin code)
- Classification: Class 1 station (一等站)

History
- Opened: 1971
Location
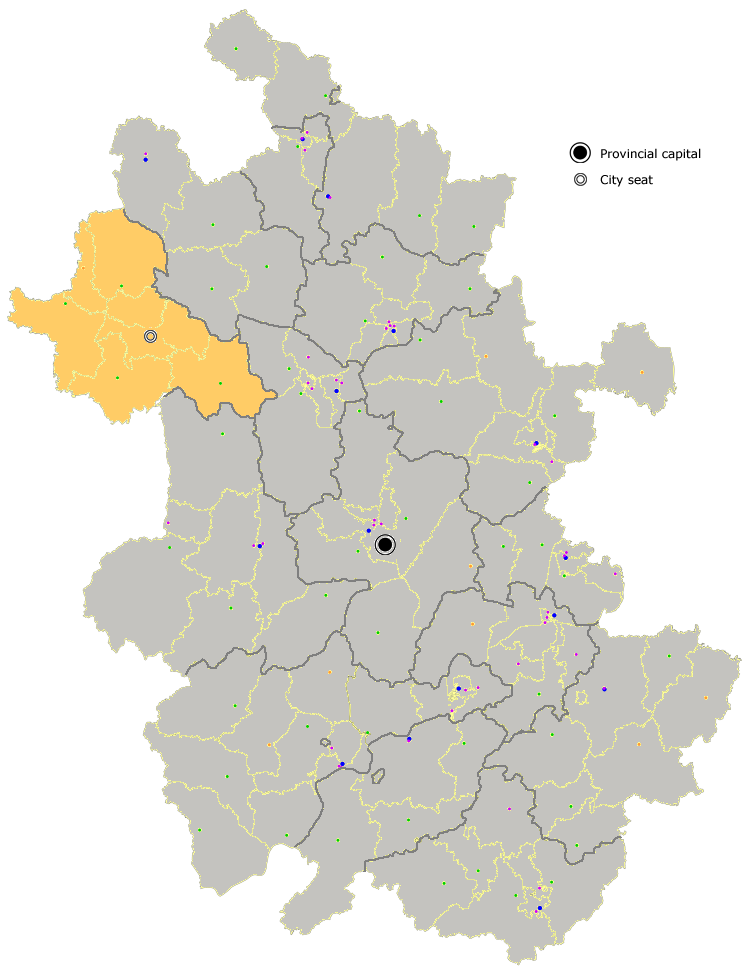
- Location within China Anhui Fuyang

Fuyang railway station (Chinese: 阜阳站) is a station on the Beijing–Kowloon railway in Fuyang, Anhui, and the largest station on this line in Anhui. It is also the terminus of the Fuhuai railway, Luofu railway and Qingfu railway. The station is one of the most important railways hubs of Anhui, served by about 90 trains a day and used by 9 million passengers a year.

== History ==
Fuyang Station was opened in 1971 with the opening of the Qingfu Railway, with an area of only 500 square meters in 1983 and 1.51 million passengers annually. The significant growth of passenger flow in Fuyang Station started in the 1990s, when Fuyang, which was already a densely populated area with too little farmland, suffered from the 1991 floods in East China, and some farmers started to migrate for work, converging into a wave of migrant workers for spring transportation in 1993. However, Fuyang station was only a marshalling station at that time, with a total station building area of 1026 square meters, 2 platforms of 320 meters long, and a waiting room of 360 square meters, which could only accommodate 300 people. Due to the serious shortage of vehicles, boxcars accounted for half of all the departing cars at Fuyang Station.

In 1996, the Beijing-Kowloon railway opened and Fuyang Station was converted from a marshalling station to a passenger station. The area of the station building was increased to 10,270 square meters, the waiting room expanded to 5,662 square meters and the ticket hall opened with 14 ticket windows. At the same time, a new service building was built; the station had 3 platforms and 9 tracks, and 4 buffer tracks were built.

Since the passenger flow of Fuyang Railway Station has mainly been migrant workers since the 1990s, especially during the Spring Festival, the Shanghai Railway Bureau once had the saying 'before the Spring Festival defend Shanghai and Hangzhou, after the Spring Festival battle Fuyang'. On July 31, 2007, a large-scale renovation of Fuyang Station began, which was completed on January 29, 2008, with a higher platform and a platform roof without columns, expanding the platform capacity by 80%. As of 2016, most of the locomotive crews of the Beijing-Kowloon trains were replaced at Fuyang Station, with a handover from Beijing Railway Bureau drivers to Nanchang Railway Bureau drivers.

== Station layout ==
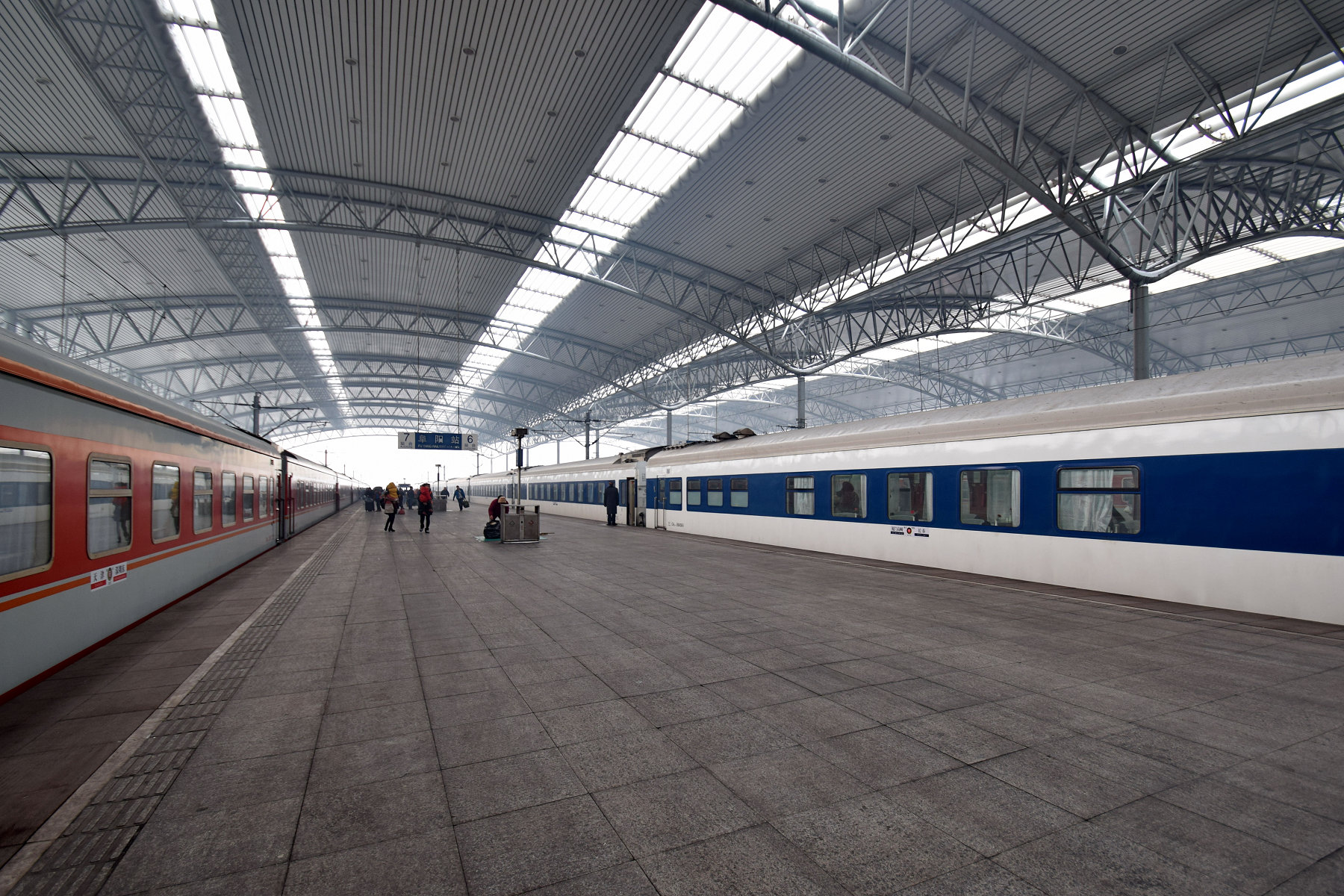
Platforms unobstructed by columns for the canopy

Fuyang Station has 5 passenger platforms and 15 train tracks, including 2 main line tracks, 9 platform tracks, 3 cargo train service tracks and 1 shared passenger-cargo track, and the Fuhuai railway track is outside of the station. The station is covered by a 56,000-square-meter columness-less canopy. The station building and the platforms are connected by a 12-meter-wide overpass for inbound passenger, two tunnels for outbound passengers and a baggage passage. The station is also equipped with facilities such as a turnaround section for train maintenance service and a passenger train preparation facility.

== See also ==
- Fuyang West railway station (Anhui), high-speed railway station serving Fuyang

Preceding station	China Railway	Following station
Bozhou towards Beijing West	Beijing–Kowloon railway	Funan towards Hung Hom
Terminus	Fuyang–Lu'an railway	Huoqiu towards Lu'an
