= Luohe railway station =

Railway station in Yuanhui District, Luohe, Henan, China

Luohe 漯河
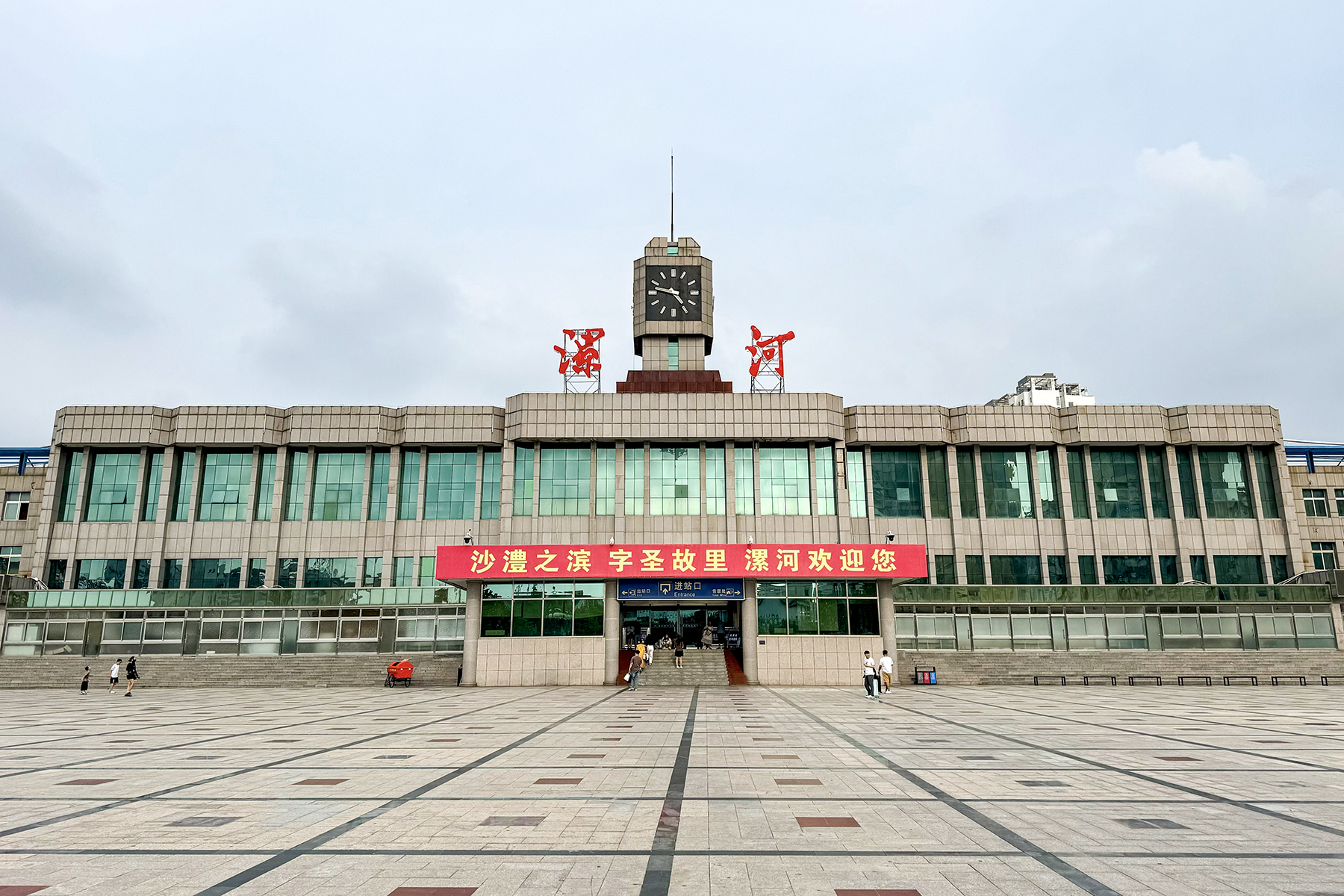
- Luohe railway station

General information
- Location: 20 Gongan Street; Yuanhui District, Luohe, Henan; China
- Coordinates: 33°34′20″N 114°02′14″E
- Operator: CR Wuhan
- Lines: Beijing–Guangzhou railway; Luohe–Fuyang railway; Mengmiao–Baofeng railway
- Distance: Beijing–Guangzhou railway: 811 kilometres (504 mi) from Beijing West; 1,493 kilometres (928 mi) from Guangzhou
- Platforms: 7 (1 side platform and 3 island platforms)
- Tracks: 11

Other information
- Station code: 20816 (TMIS code); LON (telegraph code); LHE (Pinyin code)
- Classification: Class 1 station (一等站)

History
- Opened: 1903; 123 years ago
- Former names: Yancheng (Chinese: 郾城)

Services
Preceding station	China Railway	Following station
Linying towards Beijing West	Beijing–Guangzhou railway	Xiping towards Guangzhou
Location
- Location within Henan Location within China

Luohe railway station (Chinese: 漯河站) is a station in Yuanhui District, Luohe, Henan. The station is located on Beijing–Guangzhou railway and Mengmiao–Baofeng railway, and serves as the western terminus of Luohe–Fuyang railway.

The station is the northernmost passenger station operated by CR Wuhan.

== History ==
The station was established in 1903.
