= Zhumadian railway station =

Railway station in Yicheng District, Zhumadian, Henan, China

Zhumadian 驻马店

General information
- Location: Yicheng District, Zhumadian, Henan; China
- Coordinates: 32°58′45.35″N 114°02′13″E
- Operator: CR Wuhan
- Line: Beijing–Guangzhou railway
- Distance: Beijing–Guangzhou railway: 862 kilometres (536 mi) from Beijing West; 1,434 kilometres (891 mi) from Guangzhou
- Platforms: 3 (1 side platform and 1 island platform)
- Tracks: 8
- Connections: Bus terminal

Other information
- Station code: 20858 (TMIS code); ZDN (telegraph code); ZMD (Pinyin code)
- Classification: Class 1 station (一等站)

History
- Opened: 1903; 123 years ago

Services
| Preceding station | China Railway | Following station |
|---|---|---|
| Suiping towards Beijing or Beijing West | Beijing–Guangzhou railway | Queshan towards Guangzhou |
Location
- Location within Henan Location within China

Zhumadian railway station (Chinese: 驻马店站) is a station on Beijing–Guangzhou railway in Yicheng District, Zhumadian, Henan.

== History ==
The station was established in 1903.

The station suspended its passenger services during May to December 2017 for a renovation project, including a new station building with an area of 12,000 square metres (130,000 sq ft). Passenger services were resumed from 28 December 2017.

== Station layout ==
The station has 3 platforms (1 side platform and 1 island platform) and 8 tracks. The station building is to the west of the platforms and the freight yard is to the east. According to the plan, the freight yard will be removed to make room for the east station building in the future.

| West ↑ | Station building | Waiting area, ticket office, stores |
| West ↑ | Side platform |
| West ↑ | Platform 1 | Beijing–Guangzhou railway |
| West ↑ | Through track | Beijing–Guangzhou railway northbound direction → |
| West ↑ | Through track | ← Beijing–Guangzhou railway southbound direction |
| West ↑ | Platform 2 | Beijing–Guangzhou railway |
| West ↑ | Island platform |
| West ↑ | Platform 3 | Beijing–Guangzhou railway |
| West ↑ | Track | For freight trains |
| West ↑ | Track | For freight trains |
| East ↓ | Track | For freight trains |

== See also ==
- Zhumadian West railway station: the high-speed railway station for Zhumadian.
