= Linying County =

Linying County 临颍县
- County
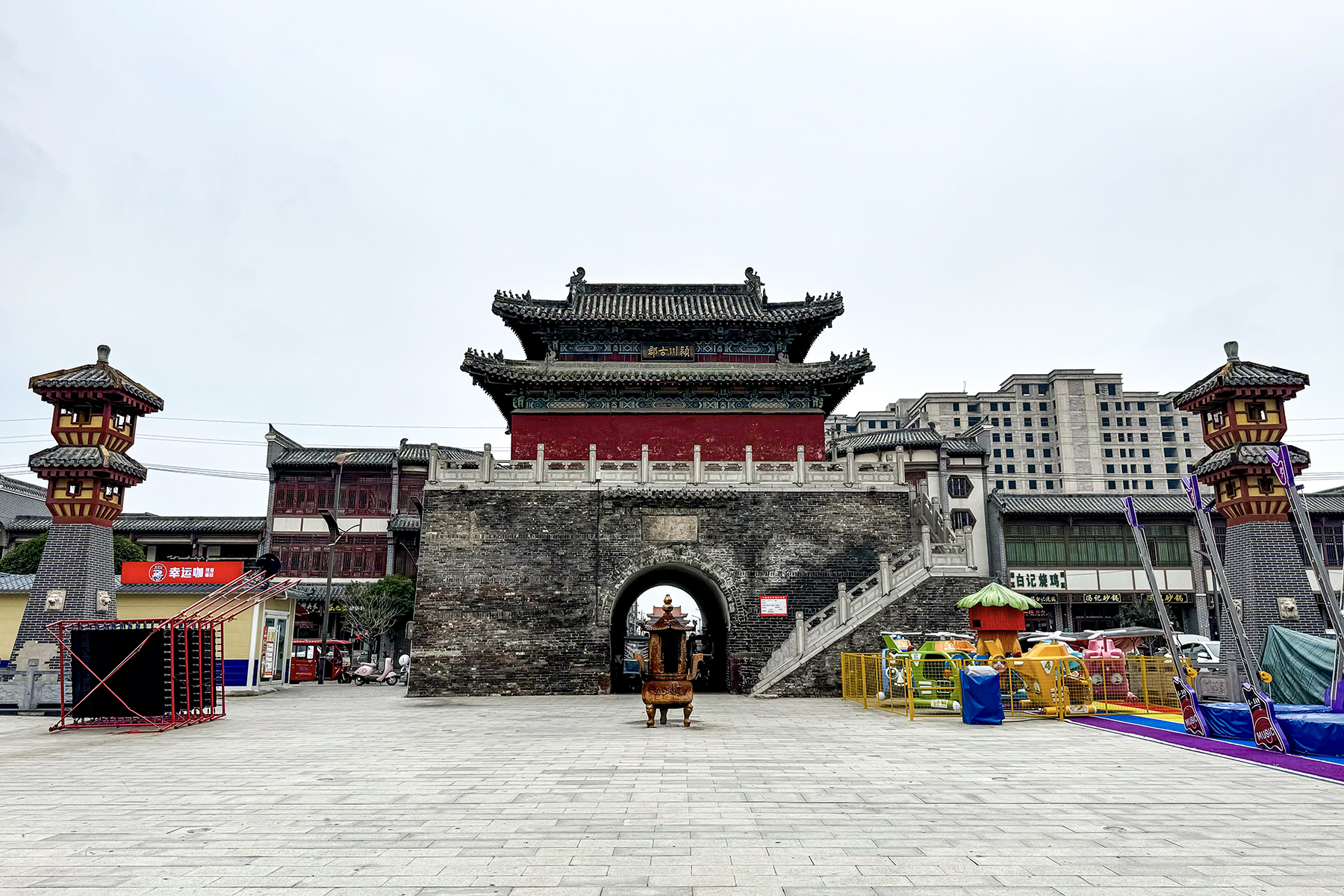

- Location of the seat in Henan
- Coordinates: 33°50′50″N 113°56′46″E
- Country: People's Republic of China
- Province: Henan
- Prefecture-level city: Luohe

Area
  - Total: 821 km^{2} (317 sq mi)

Population (2019)
  - Total: 736,800
  - Density: 897/km^{2} (2,320/sq mi)
- Time zone: UTC+8 (China Standard)
- Postal code: 462600

Linying County (simplified Chinese: 临颍县; traditional Chinese: 臨潁縣; pinyin: Línyǐng Xiàn) is a county of central Henan province, China. It is under the administration of Luohe city.

== Administrative divisions ==
As of 2012, this county is divided to 9 towns and 6 townships.

Towns

- Chengguan (城关镇)
- Duqu (杜曲镇)
- Fancheng (繁城镇)
- Juling (巨陵镇)
- Sanjiadian (三家店镇)
- Taichen (台陈镇)
- Wadian (瓦店镇)
- Wanggang (王岗镇)
- Wocheng (窝城镇)

Townships

- Chenzhuang Township (陈庄乡)
- Daguo Township (大郭乡)
- Guxiang Township (固厢乡)
- Huangdimiao Township (皇帝庙乡)
- Shiqiao Township (石桥乡)
- Wangmeng Township (王孟乡)

== Climate ==
Climate data for Linying, elevation 60 m (200 ft), (1991–2020 normals, extremes 1981–present)
| Month | Jan | Feb | Mar | Apr | May | Jun | Jul | Aug | Sep | Oct | Nov | Dec | Year |
|---|---|---|---|---|---|---|---|---|---|---|---|---|---|
| Record high °C (°F) | 21.1 (70.0) | 23.6 (74.5) | 33.0 (91.4) | 32.2 (90.0) | 39.7 (103.5) | 41.8 (107.2) | 40.2 (104.4) | 38.4 (101.1) | 37.7 (99.9) | 34.8 (94.6) | 28.2 (82.8) | 20.5 (68.9) | 41.8 (107.2) |
| Mean daily maximum °C (°F) | 6.2 (43.2) | 10.0 (50.0) | 15.2 (59.4) | 21.6 (70.9) | 27.3 (81.1) | 32.2 (90.0) | 32.3 (90.1) | 30.8 (87.4) | 27.3 (81.1) | 22.2 (72.0) | 14.6 (58.3) | 8.3 (46.9) | 20.7 (69.2) |
| Daily mean °C (°F) | 0.8 (33.4) | 4.0 (39.2) | 9.0 (48.2) | 15.2 (59.4) | 21.0 (69.8) | 26.0 (78.8) | 27.4 (81.3) | 26.0 (78.8) | 21.5 (70.7) | 16.0 (60.8) | 8.8 (47.8) | 2.7 (36.9) | 14.9 (58.8) |
| Mean daily minimum °C (°F) | −3.3 (26.1) | −0.7 (30.7) | 3.9 (39.0) | 9.3 (48.7) | 15.1 (59.2) | 20.3 (68.5) | 23.3 (73.9) | 22.3 (72.1) | 17.1 (62.8) | 11.2 (52.2) | 4.2 (39.6) | −1.5 (29.3) | 10.1 (50.2) |
| Record low °C (°F) | −16.2 (2.8) | −20.6 (−5.1) | −11.5 (11.3) | −3.3 (26.1) | 2.9 (37.2) | 11.6 (52.9) | 16.9 (62.4) | 11.7 (53.1) | 7.2 (45.0) | −1.2 (29.8) | −16.0 (3.2) | −15.0 (5.0) | −20.6 (−5.1) |
| Average precipitation mm (inches) | 14.6 (0.57) | 17.0 (0.67) | 33.3 (1.31) | 45.8 (1.80) | 71.4 (2.81) | 90.2 (3.55) | 170.9 (6.73) | 125.4 (4.94) | 77.3 (3.04) | 42.5 (1.67) | 33.8 (1.33) | 13.5 (0.53) | 735.7 (28.95) |
| Average precipitation days (≥ 0.1 mm) | 4.6 | 4.8 | 6.3 | 6.1 | 8.0 | 8.3 | 11.5 | 10.3 | 9.0 | 6.4 | 6.1 | 4.1 | 85.5 |
| Average snowy days | 3.8 | 2.7 | 1.1 | 0.1 | 0 | 0 | 0 | 0 | 0 | 0 | 1.1 | 2.4 | 11.2 |
| Average relative humidity (%) | 66 | 68 | 66 | 71 | 69 | 67 | 81 | 82 | 79 | 71 | 71 | 65 | 71 |
| Mean monthly sunshine hours | 121.1 | 127.5 | 165.8 | 194.9 | 202.2 | 183.0 | 179.0 | 168.9 | 147.4 | 144.8 | 130.1 | 127.6 | 1,892.3 |
| Percentage possible sunshine | 38 | 41 | 45 | 50 | 47 | 43 | 41 | 41 | 40 | 42 | 42 | 42 | 43 |
Source: China Meteorological Administration all-time January high

== See also ==
- Nanjie, a village in Linying County
