= Hard seat =

Cheapest class of seating in China Railway

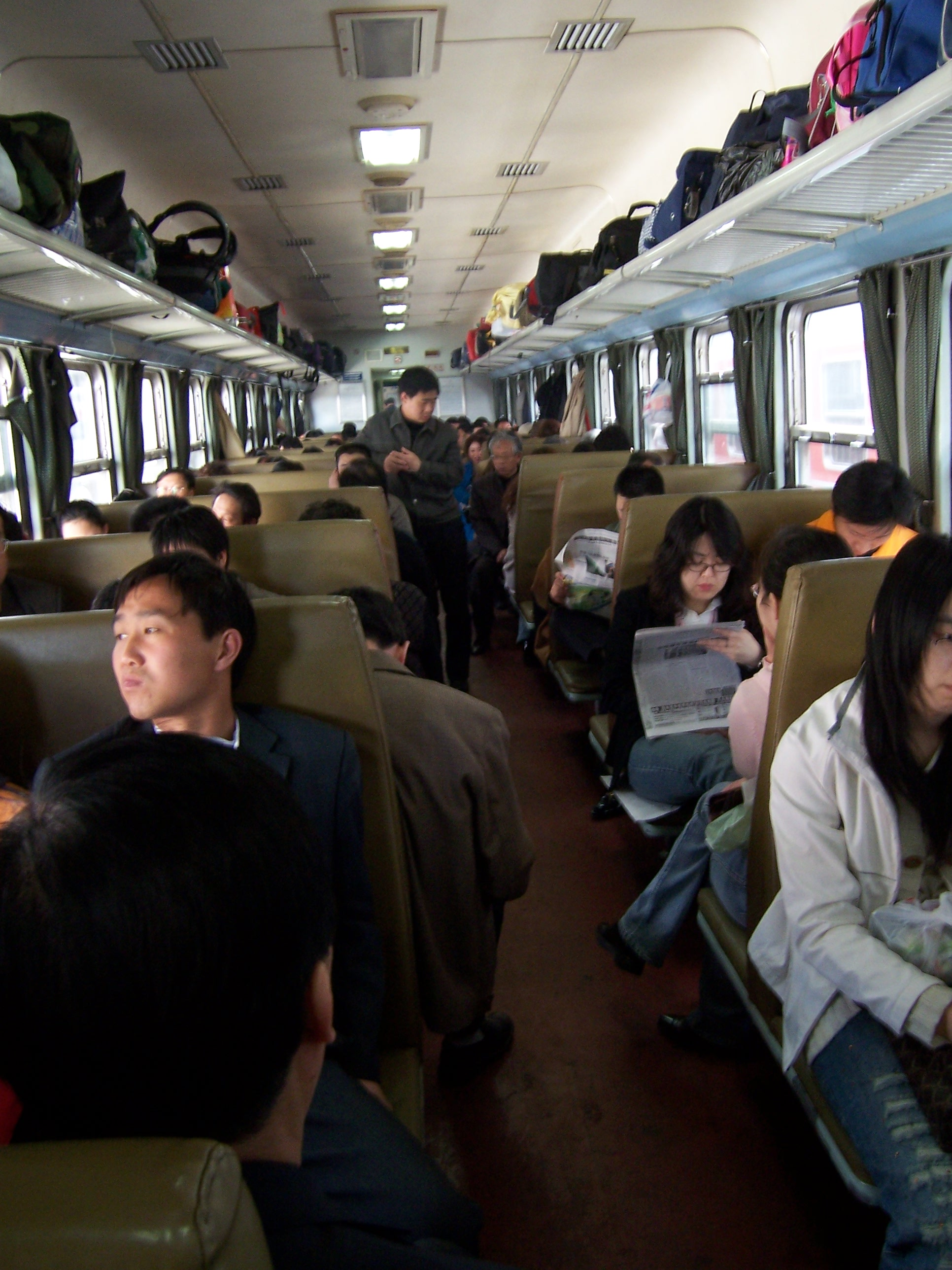
Normal hard seat coach

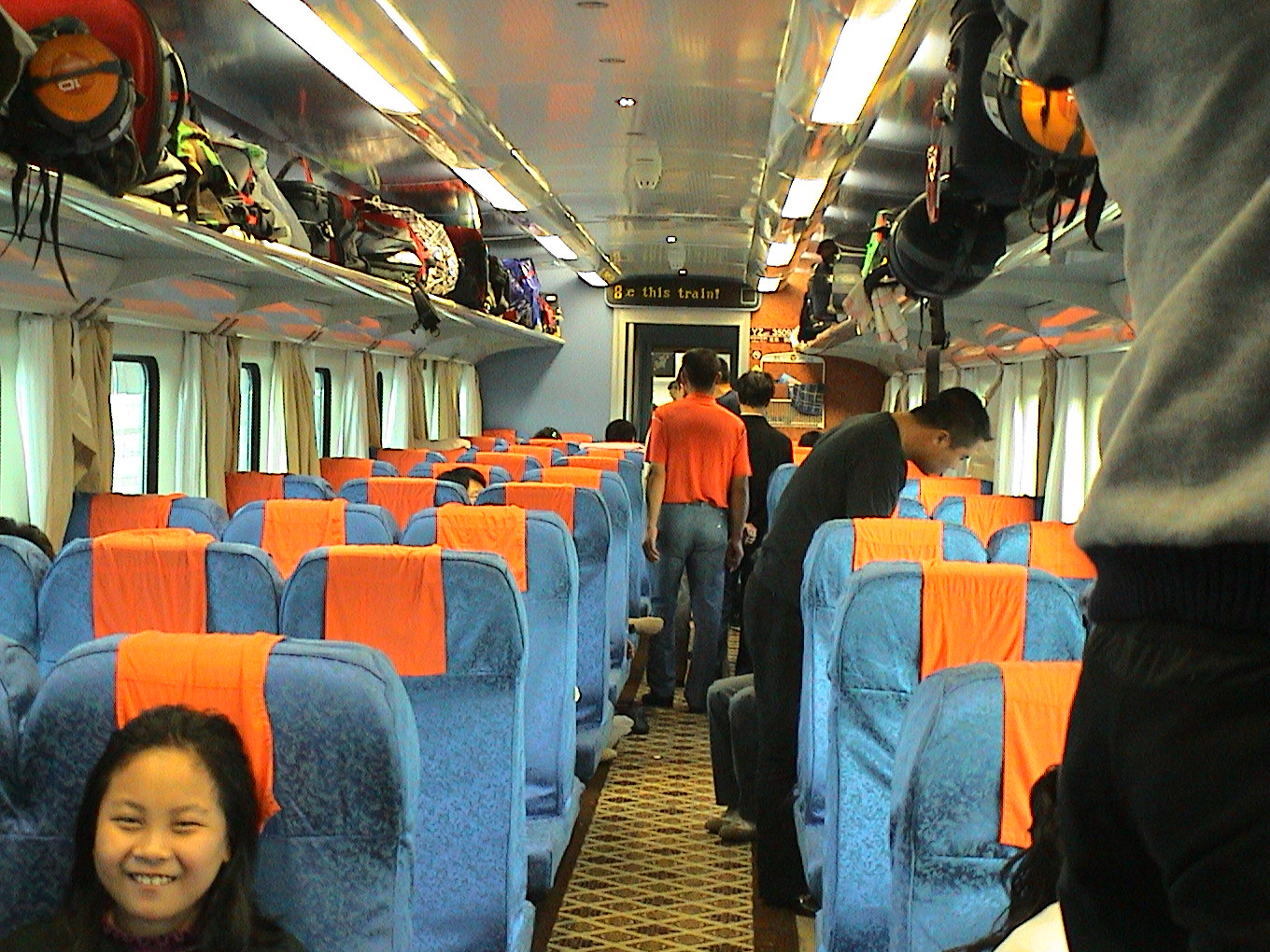
Hard seat coach of T27 train

The hard seat (Chinese: 硬座; pinyin: yìng zuò) or semi-cushioned seat, abbreviated YZ, is a train seat that is the cheapest class of seating in China Railway. It is available on non-high-speed trains.

The term "hard seat" comes from the hard, wooden seats of regular passenger trains in the Mao era; modern "hard seats" are upholstered. Several different tickets and prices can be obtained .

Each carriage provides the most basic services common to all Chinese trains, namely toilets, wash basins, and a boiling water dispenser. This demonstrates the importance of the ticket prices and the ability for them to change over time.

Compared to soft seat, hard seat carriages have more seats per row (2+3 vs. 2+2) and are usually more crowded, and people without seats may stand in hard seat carriages.

== Price ==
As of 2006, the following ticket price used in most regular lines, but some special lines have different prices.

Distance (km)	普通硬座 Regular		新型空调硬座 New type air-conditioned	
Distance (km)	普快 (pǔ kuài, lit. Normal fast)	快速 (kuài sù, lit. Fast)	普快 (pǔ kuài, lit. Normal fast)	快速 (kuài sù, lit. Fast)
1–20	2.50	3.50	7.00	9.00
21–30	3.50	4.50	8.00	10.00
31–40	3.50	4.50	8.00	10.00
41–50	4.50	5.50	10.00	12.00
51–60	4.50	5.50	10.00	12.00
61–70	5.50	7.00	11.00	13.00
71–80	5.50	7.00	11.00	13.00
81–90	7.00	8.00	13.00	15.00
91–100	8.00	9.00	14.00	16.00
101–110	8.00	9.00	15.00	17.00
111–120	9.00	10.00	17.00	19.00
121–130	10.00	11.00	18.00	20.00
131–140	11.00	13.00	19.00	22.00
141–150	12.00	14.00	21.00	24.00
151–160	12.00	14.00	21.00	24.00
161–170	13.00	15.00	22.00	25.00
171–180	14.00	16.00	26.00	29.00
181–190	14.00	16.00	26.00	29.00
191–200	15.00	17.00	27.00	30.00
201–220	17.00	19.00	30.00	33.00
(incomplete)
