= Xiping County =

Xiping County 西平县 Siping
- County
- Location of the seat in Henan
- Coordinates: 33°23′17″N 114°01′19″E
- Country: People's Republic of China
- Province: Henan
- Prefecture-level city: Zhumadian

Area
  - Total: 1,098 km^{2} (424 sq mi)

Population (2019)
  - Total: 682,200
  - Density: 621.3/km^{2} (1,609/sq mi)
- Time zone: UTC+8 (China Standard)
- Postal code: 463900

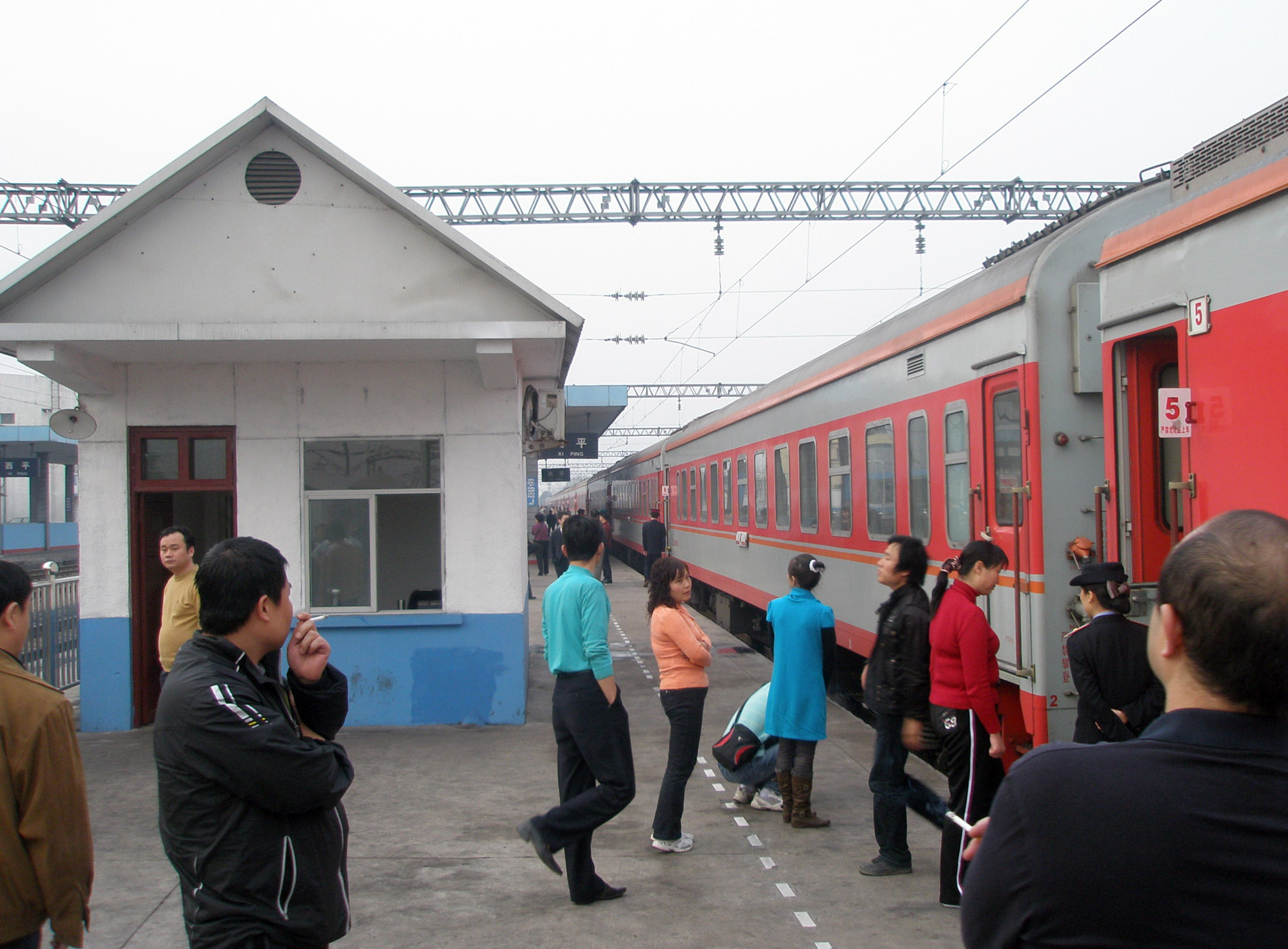
Xiping station in February 2009

Xiping County (simplified Chinese: 西平县; traditional Chinese: 西平縣; pinyin: Xīpíng Xiàn) is a county in the southeast-central part of Henan province in the People's Republic of China. It is the northernmost county-level division of the prefecture-level city of Zhumadian. Xiping covers an area of 1,098 square kilometres (424 mi^{2}) and has 840,000 inhabitants.

The place of the iron forge of Jiudian (simplified Chinese: 酒店冶铁遗址; traditional Chinese: 酒店冶鐵遺址; pinyin: Jiǔdiàn yětiě yízhǐ) from the Warring States period until the Jin dynasty and the pagoda of the Baoyan temple (宝严寺塔; 寶嚴寺塔; Bǎoyán sì tǎ) from the Tang dynasty are listed in the list of Monuments of the People's Republic of China.

== Administration ==
It administers 3 sub-district offices, 6 towns, 9 townships, 1 ethnic township and 2 others.

Subdistricts

- Baicheng Subdistrict (柏城街道)
- Baiting Subdistrict (柏亭街道)
- Baiyuan Subdistrict (柏苑街道)

Towns

- Wugouying (五沟营镇)
- Quanzhai (权寨镇)
- Shiling (师灵镇)
- Chushan (出山镇)
- Penyao (盆尧镇)
- Leizu (嫘祖镇)

Townships

- Zhongqu Township (重渠乡)
- Renhe Township
- Songji Township (宋集乡)
- Tandian Township (谭店乡)
- Lumiao Township (芦庙乡)
- Yangzhuang Township (杨庄乡)
- Zhuantan Township (专探乡)
- Erlang Township (二郎乡)
- Jiaozhuang Township (焦庄乡)

Ethnic townships

- Caizhai Hui Ethnic Township (蔡寨回族乡)

Others

- Laowangpo Farm (老王坡农场)
- Industrial Cluster Area (产业集聚区)

== Climate ==
Climate data for Xiping, elevation 56 m (184 ft), (1991–2020 normals, extremes 1981–present)
Month	Jan	Feb	Mar	Apr	May	Jun	Jul	Aug	Sep	Oct	Nov	Dec	Year
Record high °C (°F)	20.7 (69.3)	26.4 (79.5)	34.0 (93.2)	34.9 (94.8)	39.3 (102.7)	41.0 (105.8)	40.7 (105.3)	38.9 (102.0)	38.8 (101.8)	34.7 (94.5)	29.1 (84.4)	22.0 (71.6)	41.0 (105.8)
Mean daily maximum °C (°F)	6.4 (43.5)	10.1 (50.2)	15.5 (59.9)	21.9 (71.4)	27.4 (81.3)	32.0 (89.6)	32.3 (90.1)	30.9 (87.6)	27.3 (81.1)	22.3 (72.1)	14.9 (58.8)	8.6 (47.5)	20.8 (69.4)
Daily mean °C (°F)	1.3 (34.3)	4.5 (40.1)	9.6 (49.3)	15.8 (60.4)	21.4 (70.5)	26.2 (79.2)	27.6 (81.7)	26.3 (79.3)	21.9 (71.4)	16.4 (61.5)	9.4 (48.9)	3.3 (37.9)	15.3 (59.5)
Mean daily minimum °C (°F)	−2.8 (27.0)	0.0 (32.0)	4.6 (40.3)	10.2 (50.4)	15.8 (60.4)	20.9 (69.6)	23.8 (74.8)	22.7 (72.9)	17.7 (63.9)	11.7 (53.1)	4.9 (40.8)	−0.7 (30.7)	10.7 (51.3)
Record low °C (°F)	−13.6 (7.5)	−15.0 (5.0)	−8.8 (16.2)	−1.5 (29.3)	3.8 (38.8)	11.9 (53.4)	17.1 (62.8)	13.4 (56.1)	7.4 (45.3)	−0.7 (30.7)	−8.5 (16.7)	−11.3 (11.7)	−15.0 (5.0)
Average precipitation mm (inches)	18.5 (0.73)	20.8 (0.82)	37.6 (1.48)	44.8 (1.76)	71.1 (2.80)	112.8 (4.44)	193.3 (7.61)	135.9 (5.35)	72.9 (2.87)	50.0 (1.97)	39.9 (1.57)	17.3 (0.68)	814.9 (32.08)
Average precipitation days (≥ 0.1 mm)	5.4	5.6	6.7	6.8	8.5	7.9	11.2	10.6	8.9	6.9	6.4	5.2	90.1
Average snowy days	4.7	3.1	1.3	0.1	0	0	0	0	0	0	1.1	2.5	12.8
Average relative humidity (%)	68	67	68	69	68	66	79	82	76	70	70	68	71
Mean monthly sunshine hours	128.6	133.7	169.7	201.0	210.0	192.2	199.5	183.0	159.9	155.0	145.5	133.5	2,011.6
Percentage possible sunshine	41	43	46	51	49	45	46	45	44	45	47	43	45
Source: China Meteorological Administration
