= Fuyang–Lu'an railway =

Railway line in Anhui

Overview
- Status: Operational

Service
- Type: Heavy rail

History
- Opened: 28 December 2013

Technical
- Line length: 167.8 km (104 mi)
- Track gauge: 1,435 mm (4 ft 8 1/2 in) standard gauge
- Electrification: 50 Hz 25,000 V
- Operating speed: 160 km/h (99 mph)

The Fuyang–Lu'an railway is an electrified single-track railway line in China. It is 167.8 kilometres per hour (104.3 mph) long and has a maximum speed of 160 kilometres per hour (99 mph).

The line has one passenger station, Huoqiu.

== History ==
Construction of the line began on 10 August 2009. It was opened on 28 December 2013. Passenger service was introduced on 2 July 2014.
