= Dingzhou railway station =

Railway station in Baoding, Hebei, China

Dingzhou 定州
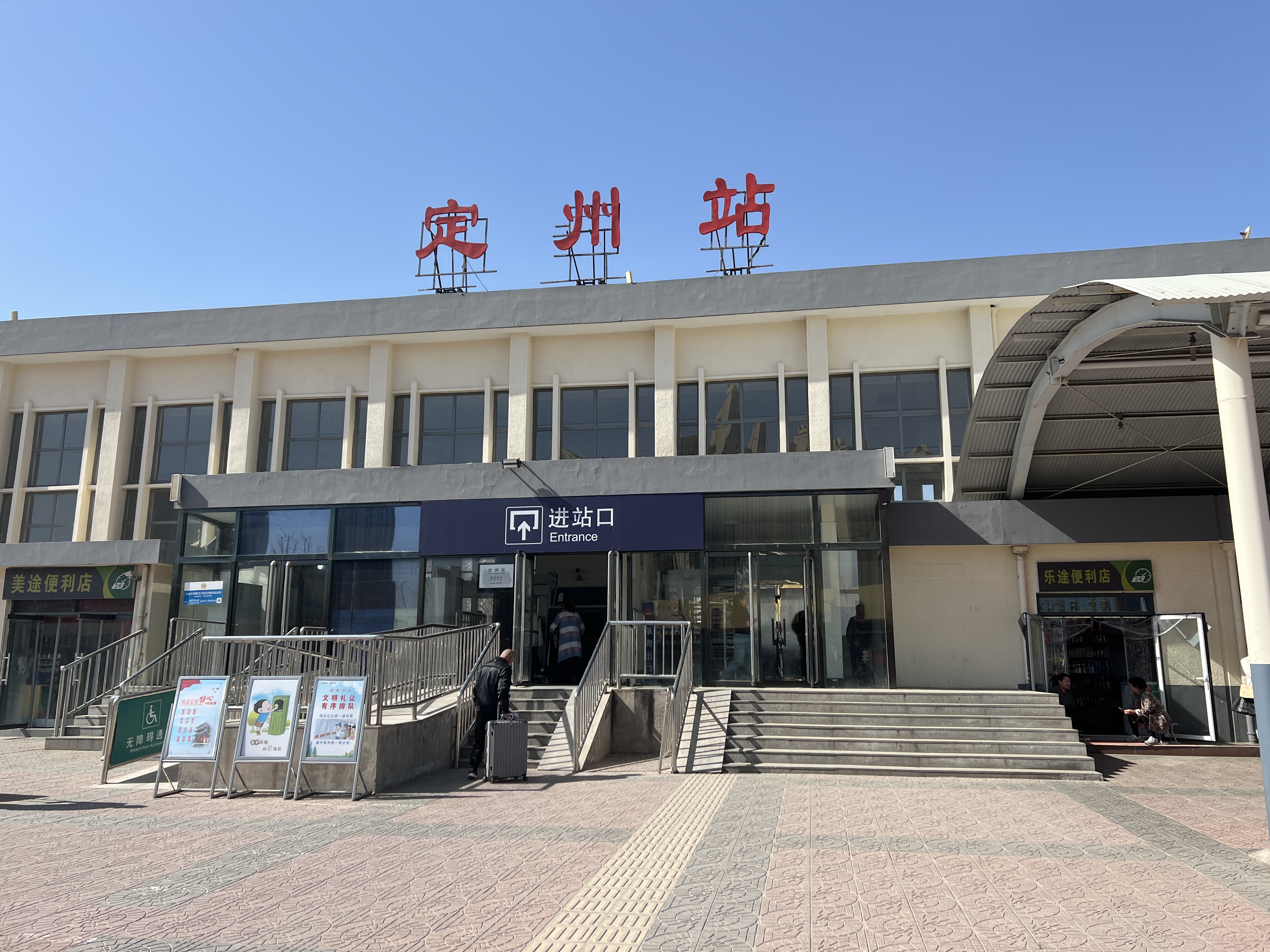

General information
- Location: 62 Boling N. Street; Dingzhou, Baoding, Hebei; China
- Coordinates: 38°31′46″N 114°58′02″E
- Operator: CR Beijing
- Line: Beijing–Guangzhou railway
- Distance: Beijing–Guangzhou railway: 199 kilometres (124 mi) from Beijing West; 2,097 kilometres (1,303 mi) from Guangzhou
- Platforms: 3 (1 side platform and 1 island platform)
- Tracks: 9

Other information
- Station code: 20339 (TMIS code); DXP (telegraph code); DZH (Pinyin code)
- Classification: Class 2 station (二等站)

History
- Opened: 1901
- Former names: Dingxian (Chinese: 定县)

Services
Preceding station	China Railway	Following station
Baoding towards Beijing West	Beijing–Guangzhou railway	Zhengding towards Guangzhou
Location
- Location within Hebei Location within China

Dingzhou railway station (Chinese: 定州站) is a station on Beijing–Guangzhou railway in Dingzhou, Baoding, Hebei.

== History ==
The station was opened in 1901.
