= Zhengding railway station =

Railway station in Shijiazhuang, China

Zhengding 正定
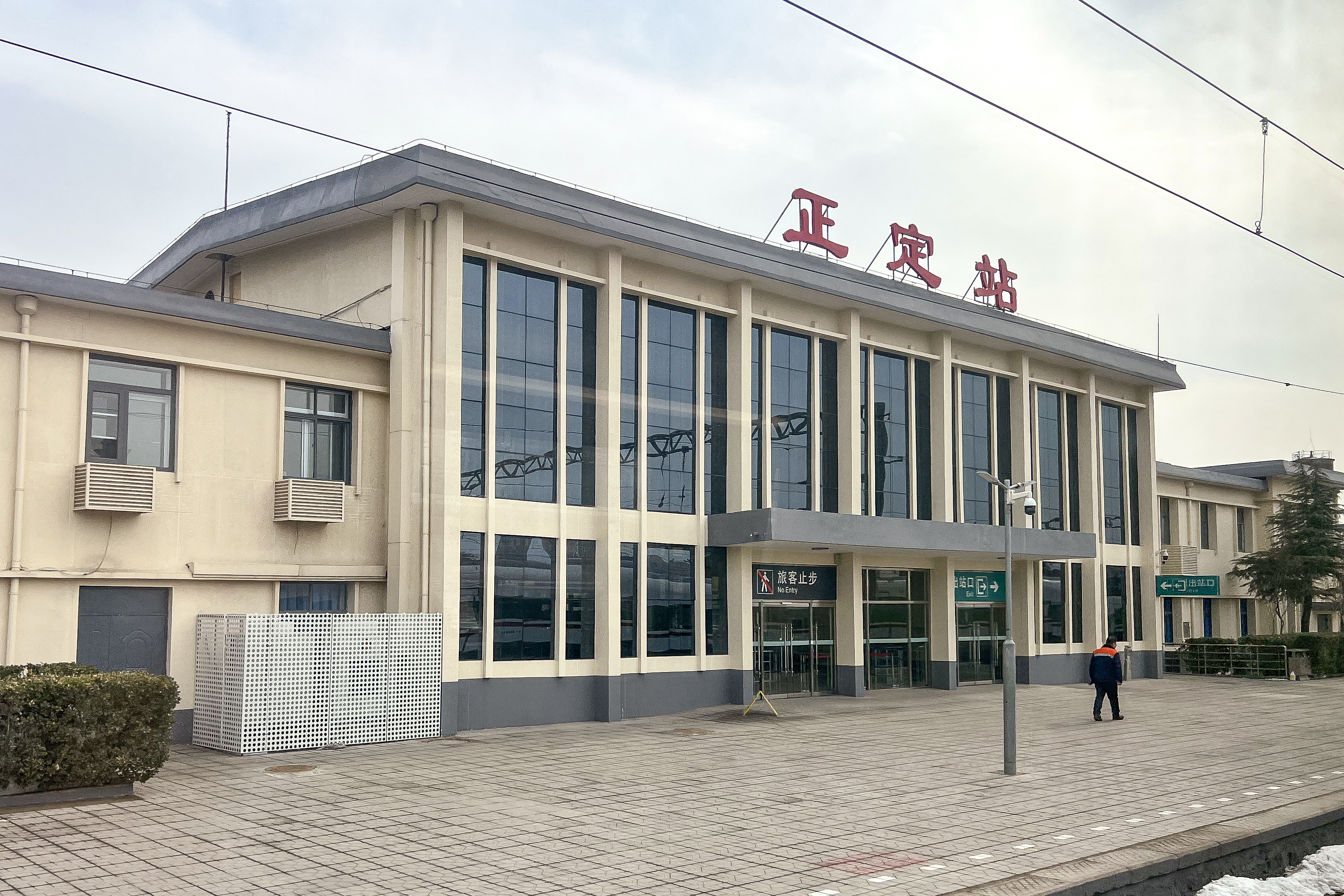

General information
- Location: 83 Chezhan N. Street; Zhengding County, Shijiazhuang, Hebei; China
- Coordinates: 38°09′43″N 114°33′03″E
- Operator: CR Beijing
- Line: Beijing–Guangzhou railway
- Distance: Beijing–Guangzhou railway: 253 kilometres (157 mi) from Beijing West; 2,043 kilometres (1,269 mi) from Guangzhou
- Platforms: 3 (1 side platform and 1 island platform)
- Tracks: 5

Other information
- Station code: 20360 (TMIS code); ZDP (telegraph code); ZDI (Pinyin code)
- Classification: Class 3 station (三等站)

History
- Opened: 1902

Services
Preceding station	China Railway	Following station
Dingzhou towards Beijing West	Beijing–Guangzhou railway	Shijiazhuang towards Guangzhou
Location
- Location within Hebei Location within China

Zhengding railway station (Chinese: 正定站) is a station on Beijing–Guangzhou railway in Zhengding County, Shijiazhuang, Hebei.

== History ==
The station was opened in 1902.

Passenger services were suspended in 2011, and were resumed on 1 July 2015.
