= Dashatou railway station =

Former railway station in Guangzhou, China

Coordinates: 23.1203°N 113.277°E

Dashatou Railway Station (Chinese: 大沙头站; pinyin: Dàshātóu zhàn), formerly known as Guangjiu Railway Station (广九站), was originally located at the southern end of Baiyun Road, Yuexiu District, Guangzhou, Guangdong Province, China. It was founded in 1911. It used to be the largest railway passenger station in Guangzhou. After the new Guangzhou passenger railway station opened in 1974, Dashatou railway station was once used as a passenger station but was demolished in 1985.

== History ==
=== Qing Dynasty ===
At the end of the 19th century, when Hong Kong had become a British colony, the Hong Kong Government began to propose to the Qing Government a Kowloon-Guangzhou railway construction plan to facilitate the rapid transportation of goods and personnel to the Guangdong market. In 1898, under pressure from Britain, the Qing government's railway minister Sheng Xuanhuai signed a draft contract with BCRI and BCRI in 1899. According to the draft agreement, the Canton-Kowloon Railway is planned to build 121 miles, bounded by the Luohu Bridge in Shenzhen (then actually Xin'an County) and divided into English and Chinese sections. The 22-mile-long section of the British Railway (now the MTR East Rail Line) in Hong Kong was built by the British Government and funded by the British Government's bond issuance in Hong Kong.

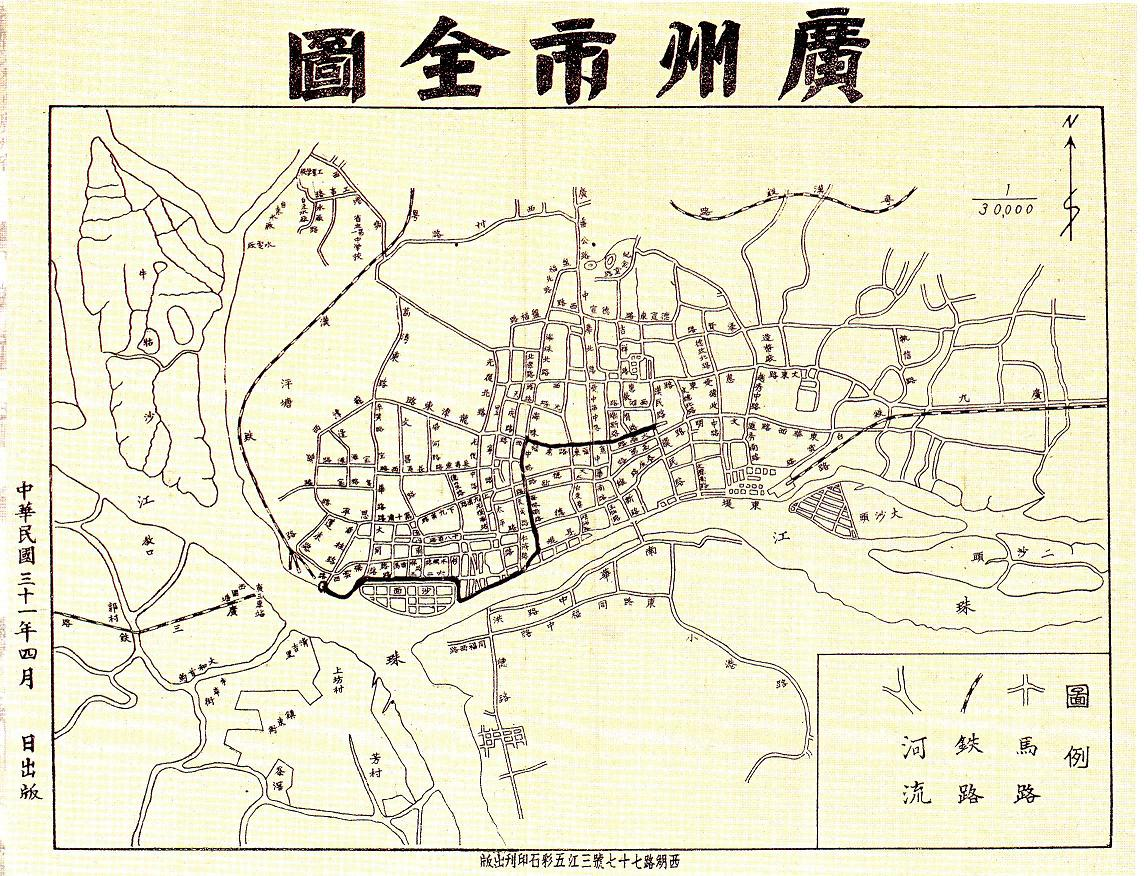
In 1942, the "whole map of Guangzhou", when Guangjiu Station was opposite to Dashatou Island

In 1911, Guangzhou's second railway, Guangzhou-Kowloon Railway, was opened to traffic, and a station was set up in Dashatou. It was named Guangjiu Station, also known as Dashatou Railway Station, which adopted Western modern architectural style. At that time, Guangzhou built five large areas, including Guangzhou City, Dongguan, Nanguan, Xiguan and Henan Province. Dashatou is located in the southeast corner of Guangzhou, that is, east of Dongguan Mountain south foot. Guangjiu Station is located on the west side of Dashatou Island, that is, the south side of the horizontal sand, became the city boundary landmark building southeast of Guangzhou City.

=== Chinese nation ===
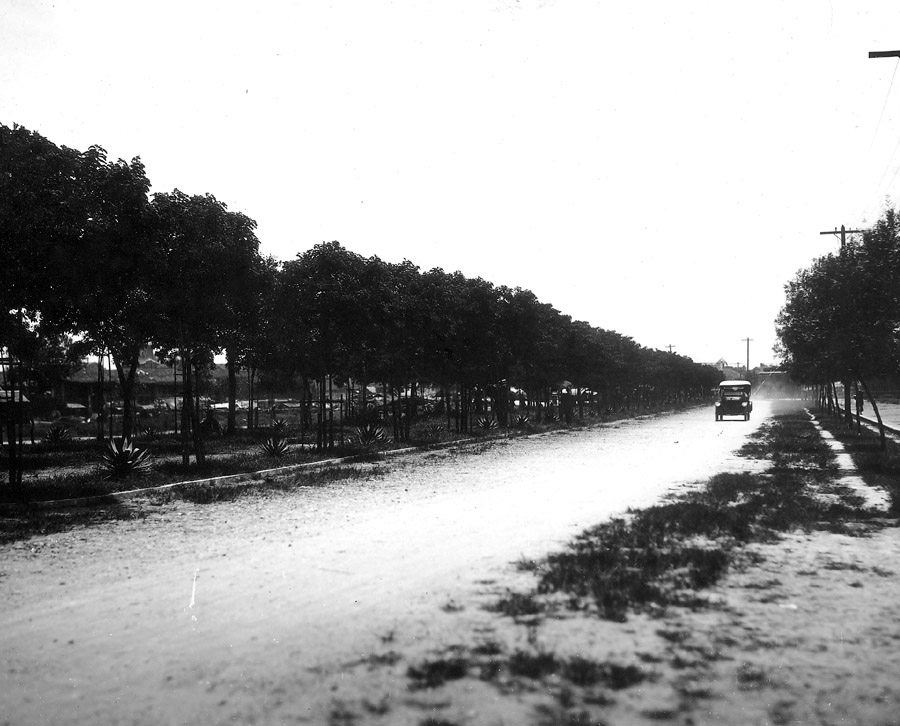
In 1924, a new road in front of Dashatou railway station (now Baiyun Road)

On 21 March 1922, General Deng Keng, chief of staff of the Guangdong Revolutionary Army, returned from Hong Kong to Guangzhou by train. He was killed by two murderers when he arrived at Guangjiu Station and was about to leave. It is generally believed that the cause of the incident was that Teng was considered a thorn in Chen's side during the conflict between Sun Yat-sen and Chen Chiong-ming, and was thus assassinated by Chen Chueh-min and Chen Dasheng, his subordinates. One day in the summer of the same year, Sun Yat-sen came to Guangjiu Station and took a train to Shilong, 50 kilometers away, to command the battle against Chen Jiongming.

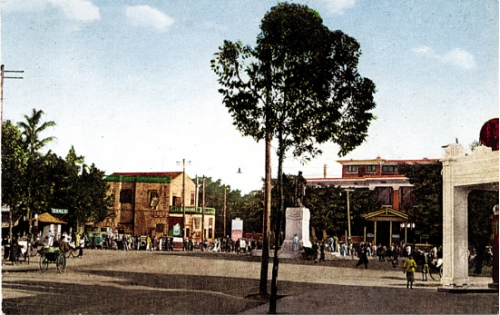
1940s Guangzhou Dashatou Station Station Square

In August 1937, the National Government built a section of the Huangpu Spur Line from the original design to the Canton-Han Railway West Union Station to the Canton-Kowloon Railway Shek Pai Station, known as the "Guangbei Liaison Line". In 1940, in order to expand the Tianhe Airport, the invading Japanese army demolished the 3 km line between Dongshan (Meihua Village) and Shibaigan on the Canton-Kowloon Railway.

After the Second Sino-Japanese War, the Canton-Kowloon Railway Bureau was rescinded and the section of the Canton-Kowloon Railway was assigned to the Guangdong-Han Railway Administration. By 1947, in line with the overall management of the Guangdong-Han Railway, Canton-San Railway and Canton-Kowloon Railway by the Guangdong-Han Railway Administration of the Ministry of Transport, a liaison line between Yunlu and Yongcun was built. At this point, passenger trains on the Guangdong-Han Railway could reach Dashatou railway station, which was expanded to start and end stations for passenger trains from Guangjiu and Yuehan Roads, and renamed Guangzhou East Station. Meanwhile, Huangsha Railway Station, the original terminus of the Canton-Han Railway, was renamed Guangzhou South Railway Station, which mainly deals with freight and train formation .

By the end of 1940s, although Guangzhou had developed southward to the present location of Leijiao Village, but the other directions basically did not extend. Dashatou railway station from the southeast corner of the city to the eastern landmark, gradually surrounded by the city. As the railway station is still on the edge of the city, it has no significant impact on the city's transportation, and because it is close to the city center, it is growing. Baiyun Road in front of the station was the widest road in Guangzhou until 1949 due to its location in front of the railway station. It was the first attempt at a double road with green belts, which became a model road.

=== Modern times ===
After 1949, the railway capacity in Guangzhou area increased year by year, and the Guangzhou Railway Bureau also carried out the overall transformation of the railway and the station. In 1951, Guangzhou East Railway Station was renamed Guangzhou Station, which was designated as a special railway passenger station in Guangzhou. However, Guangzhou people still call it "East Railway Station".

With the completion of Wuhan Yangtze River Bridge in 1957, the Beijing-Hankou Railway and Guangzhou-Hankou Railway merged into Beijing-Guangzhou Railway, and the completion of the Southwest Guangzhou Bridge in 1960. At that time, other stations in Guangzhou railway hub were mainly freight, so Guangzhou station became the most important railway passenger station in Guangzhou, and the passenger flow pressure was very heavy. In 1962, 3.17 million passengers were dispatched, an average of nearly 10,000 per day, and 20,000 to 30,000 per day during the peak holiday season. At that time, the station had 11 stockways, with a narrow yard and insufficient storage lines, and the arrival and storage of passenger trains, vehicle maintenance and maintenance were all shared, and no formal waiting rooms were available. Every festival also need to borrow the road in front of the station to build temporary cars and travel sheds.

=== East Station Incident ===
In the 1950s, the construction of Guangzhou New Passenger Station (now Guangzhou Station) was put on the agenda in line with the idea of Tao Zhu, then secretary of the Guangdong Provincial Party Committee. In 1958, the construction of the Guangzhou New Passenger Station, which was located in Liuhuaqiao, was started, and in 1962, the construction of the new passenger station was suspended due to the damage caused by the Great Leap Forward Movement to China's national economy. In the same year, a special incident occurred at Guangzhou Station. In June 1962, tens of thousands of people gathered around the railway station to buy train tickets to Pingshan and Shenzhen. The Baiyun Road, which was directly accessible to Guangji Elementary School, was crowded with people. Guangzhou Public Security Bureau sent propaganda vehicles to persuade people to leave. People staying without a ticket later drummed, some people attacked the East Station police station, police propaganda cars were also overturned by the public. Sun Leyi, then deputy mayor of Guangzhou, was also surrounded by hundreds of people. By 1 a.m. on June 2, the authorities had declared martial law, and the police had dispersed. The city's public security bureau had organized police to arrest the people. The high-ranking officials behind held internal meetings, Tao Zhu defined it as the so-called enemy-friend contradiction, which led to the decision to dispatch the army. By 6 June, the authorities had dispatched a battalion of heavily armed PLA soldiers to block both ends of the station and drive the crowd out. Another group of soldiers advanced from inside the station. The city government's propaganda car was broadcast on trompe. Dozens of people were arrested and most of the people who rushed to the train station were dispersed.

=== End of the station ===
In 1972, Guangzhou New Passenger Station resumed work. On April 12, 1974, the new Guangzhou Station was completed and opened, and the layout of the Guangzhou railway hub was adjusted accordingly. Guangzhou New Passenger Station was officially named Guangzhou Station. The original Guangzhou Station in Dashatou was renamed Guangzhou East Station. All passenger services were gradually moved to the new Guangzhou Railway Station. In September 1984, Guangzhou Technical Work Railway Station (Guangzhou Keji Station) located in the northwest of Guangzhou Station was completed and put into operation.

By the 1980s, with the development of Guangzhou's cities, the Dashatou railway station, once on the edge of the city, had been surrounded by the city. In November 1984, the former Guangzhoudongkeji Railway Station in Dashatou to Tianhe section of the former Guangzhou-Kowloon Railway was demolished, and the Yunyong contact line was subsequently withdrawn. Eight busy intersections in the urban areas, including Tung Wah East Road, Tsing Chien Road, Tat Road, Meihua Village and Tung Fung East Road, were demolished simultaneously to improve urban traffic and are now part of the Inner Ring Road. Dashatou railway station became a "legacy" station, no longer connected by rail, and was cleared in early 1985. The site is still owned by Guangzhou Railway Bureau. In 1997, three high-rise Guangzhou Railway Group dormitory buildings and one Guangdong Transportation Department office building (Guangdong Transportation Building) were built on the original site of Dashatou railway station.

=== Memorials ===
In 2010, Yuexiu District Landscaping and Greening Bureau added decoration to the green belt in the middle of Baiyun Road. Granite steam locomotive statues were installed at the northeast end of the green belt. The project was completed in July 2010.In 2017, a small park was built between Donghua South Road and Dashatou Second Road, named Guangjiu Railway Memorial Park. The park has a construction-type 6501 steam locomotive and a YZ22 passenger car, as well as tracks, traffic lights and archway views of the old station.

== Photo Gallery ==
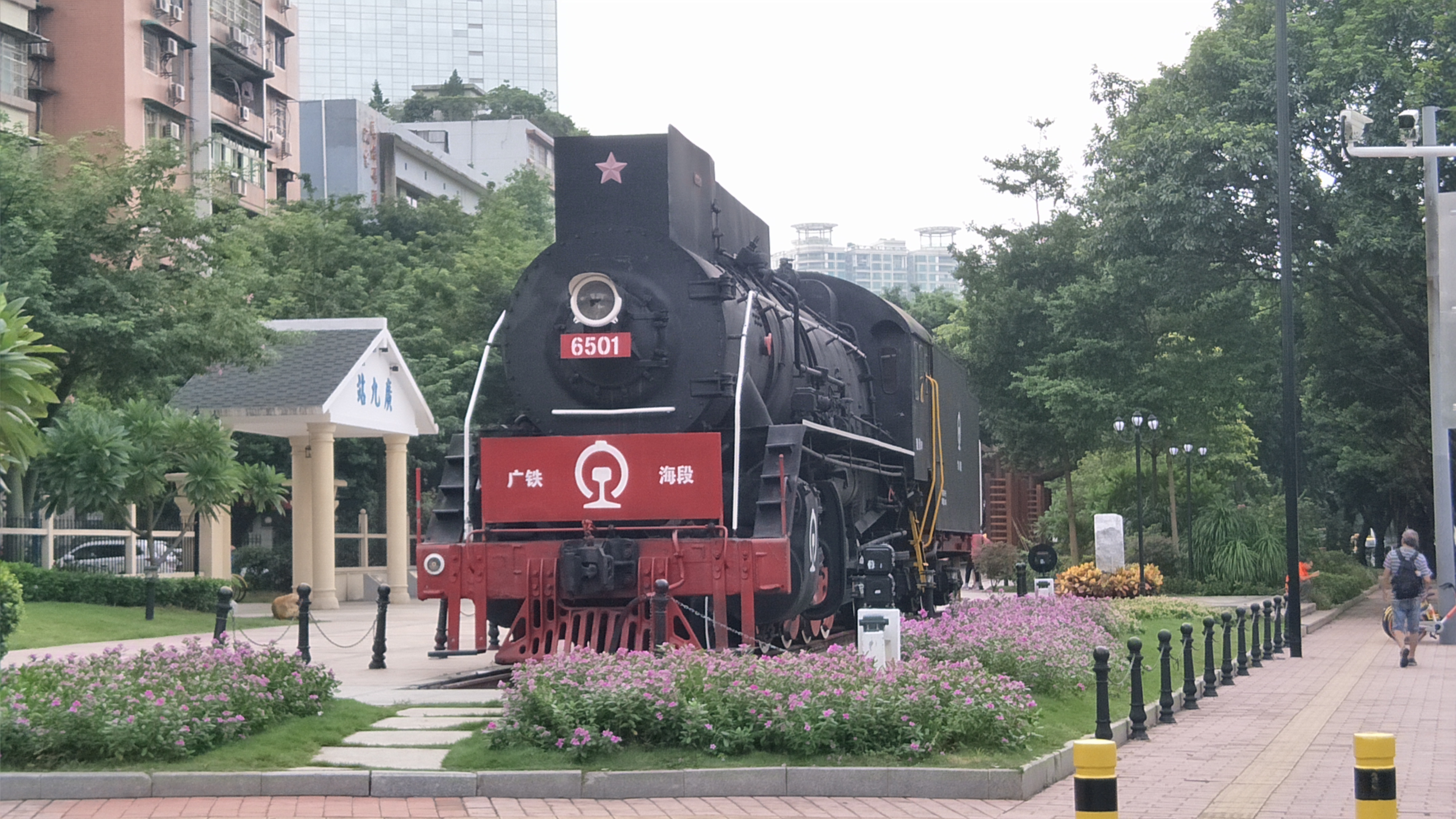
The construction type of steam locomotive No. 6501 on display in Dashatou Railway Park, on the left is the arch that imitates the station building

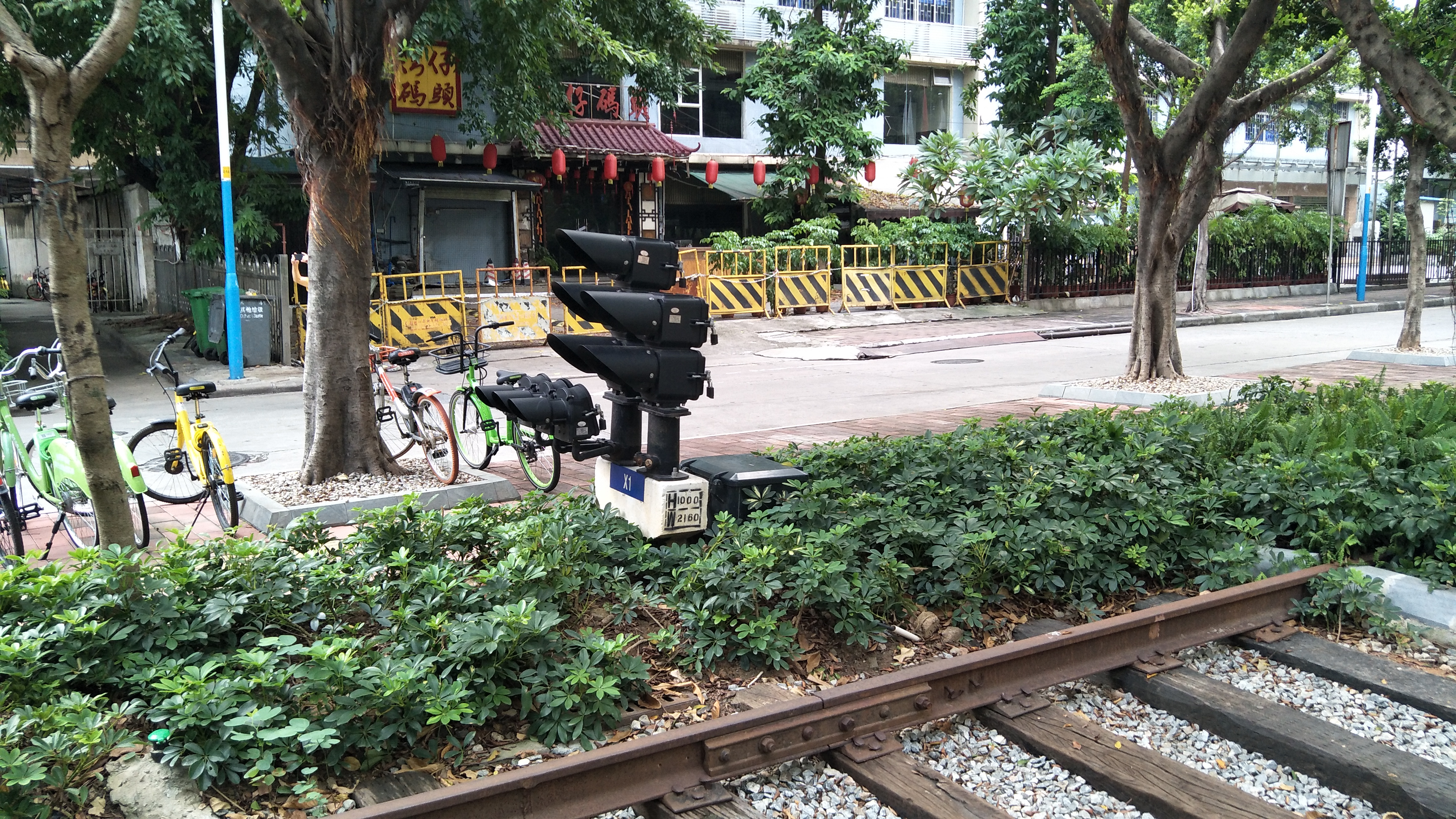
Dashatou Railway Park signal lights and rail landscape

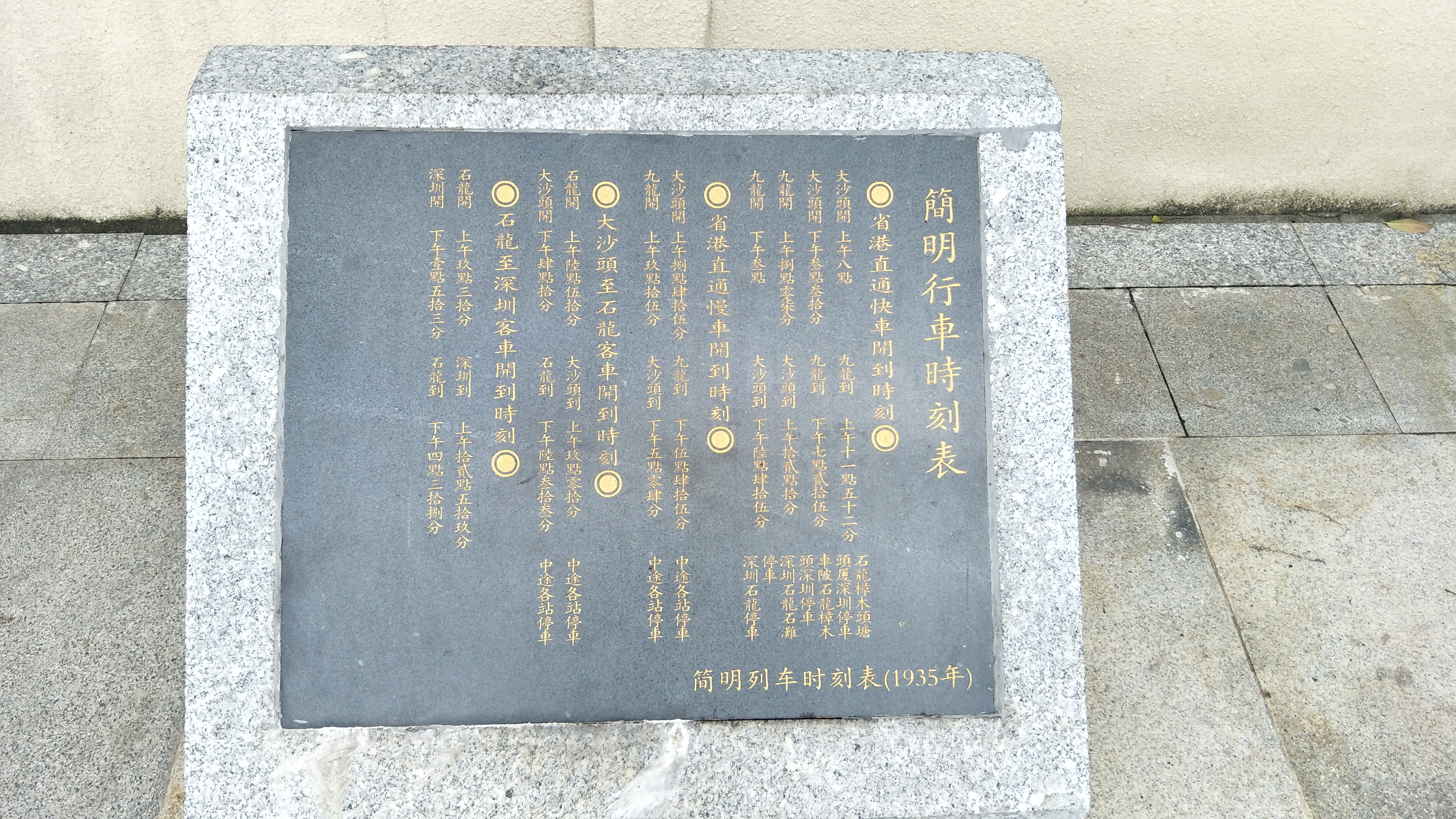
Canton-Kowloon Railway Timetable Statue in Dashatou Railway Park

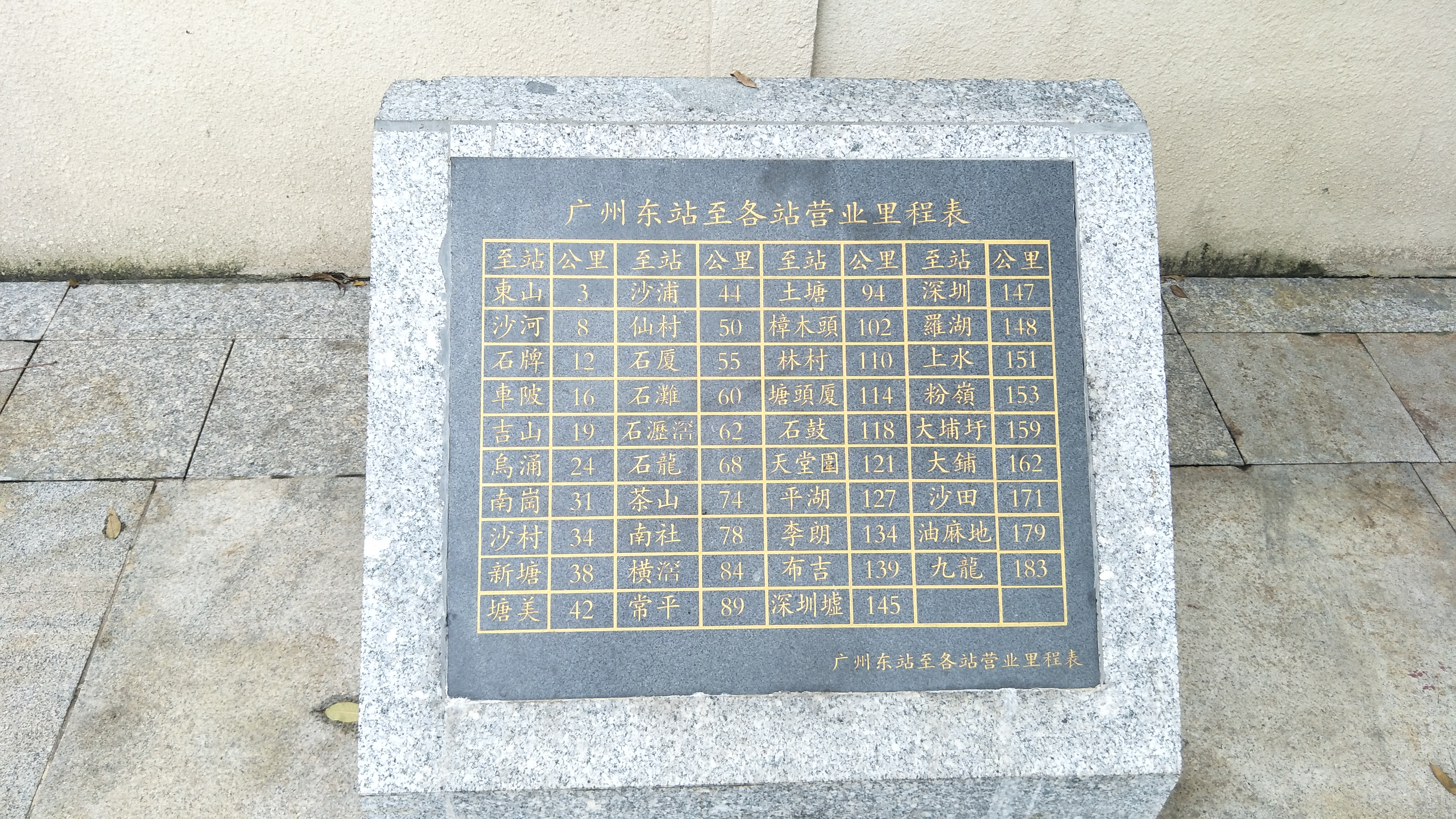
Canton-Kowloon Railway Fare Table statue in Dashatou Railway Park

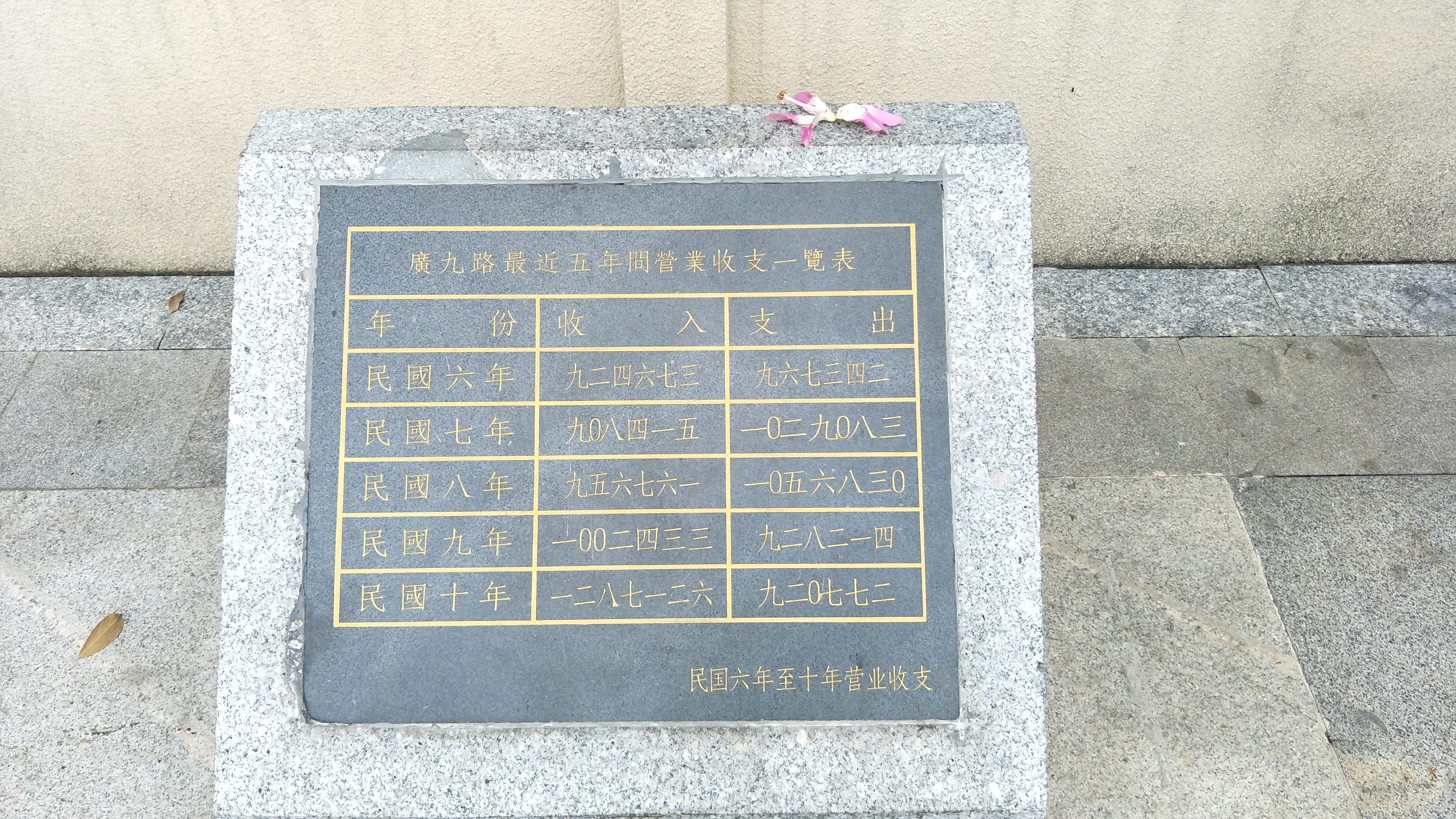
Statue of the early passenger and freight traffic of the Guangzhou-Kowloon Railway in Dashatou Railway Park

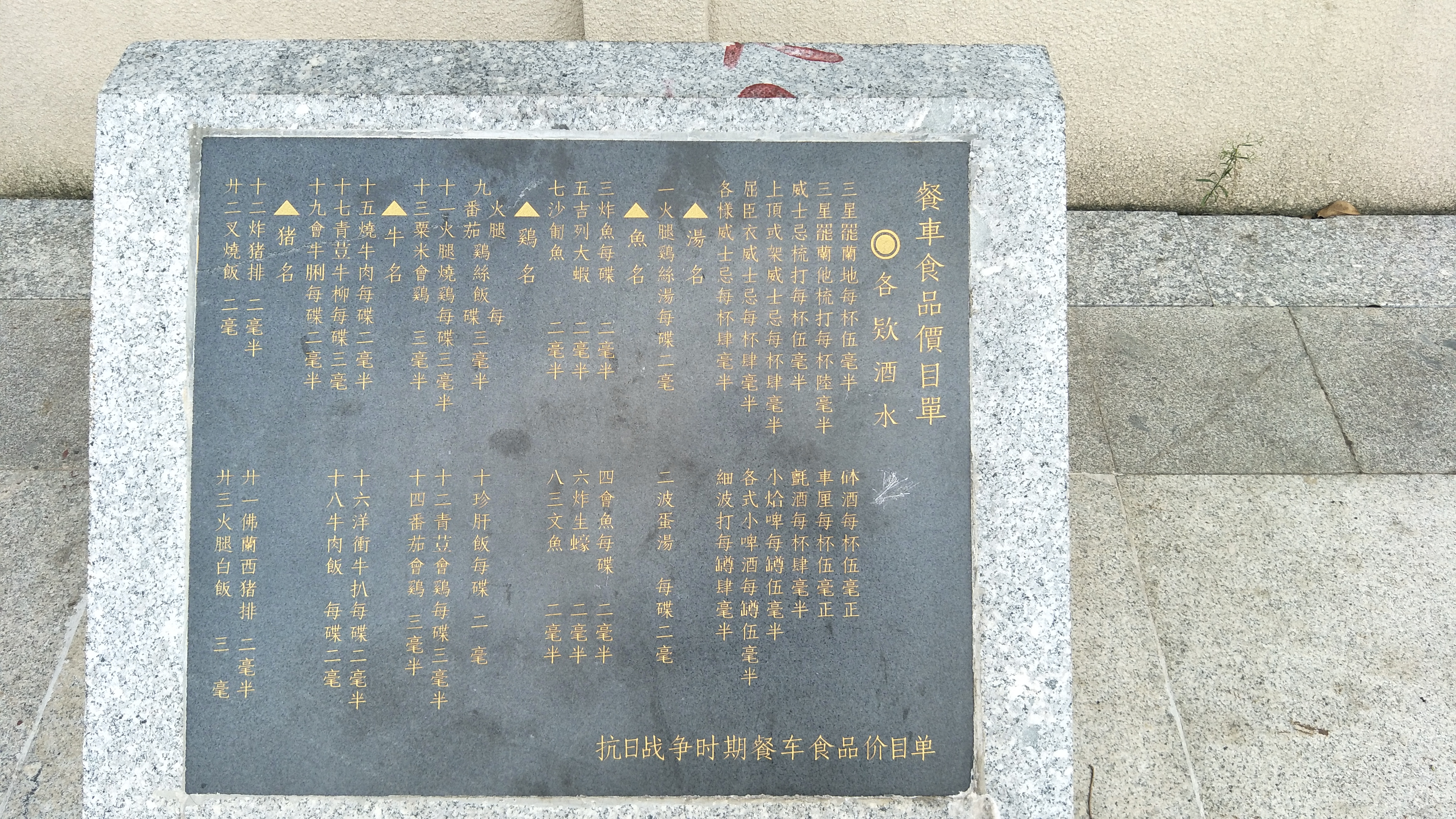
Canton-Kowloon Railway Dining Menu Statue in Dashatou Railway Park
