= Ziyuangang station =

Guangzhou Metro Line 11 station

Ziyuangang 梓元岗
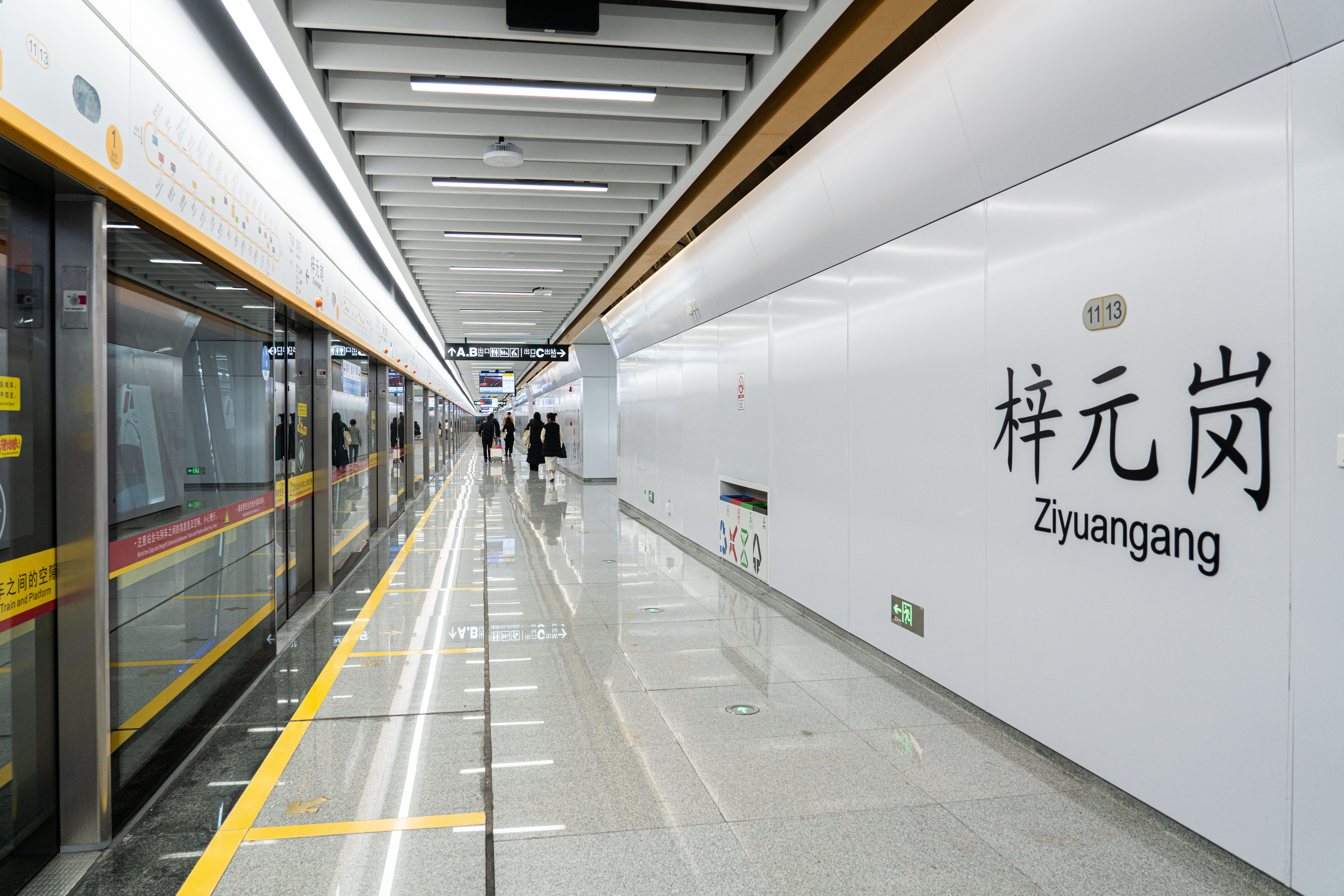
- Platform 1

Chinese name
- Simplified Chinese: 梓元岗站
- Traditional Chinese: 梓元崗站
Transcriptions
Standard Mandarin
- Hanyu Pinyin: Zǐyuángǎng Zhàn
Yue: Cantonese
- Yale Romanization: Jíyùhngōng Jaahm
- Jyutping: Zi^{2}jyun^{4}gong^{1} Zaam^{6}

General information
- Location: Intersection of Sanyuanli Avenue (三元里大道), Airport Road (机场路) and Jiefang North Road (解放北路), Sanyuanli Subdistrict; Baiyun District, Guangzhou, Guangdong; China
- Coordinates: 23°9′21.67″N 113°15′26.75″E
- Operator: Guangzhou Metro Co. Ltd.
- Lines: Line 11; Line 24 (U/C)
- Platforms: 2 (1 split-island platform)
- Tracks: 2

Construction
- Structure type: Underground
- Accessible: Yes

Other information
- Station code: 1113

History
- Opened: Line 11: 28 December 2024 (22 months ago)

Services
Preceding station	Guangzhou Metro	Following station
Liuhua Outer Circle	Line 11	Guangzhou University of Chinese Medicine Inner Circle
Future services
Yuanjing towards Guangzhou North Railway Station	Line 24	Sun Yat-sen Memorial Hall towards Jiangfu
Location

Ziyuangang Station (simplified Chinese: 梓元岗站; traditional Chinese: 梓元崗站; pinyin: Zǐyuángǎng Zhàn; Cantonese Yale: Jíyùhngōng Jaahm) is a station on Line 11 of the Guangzhou Metro. It started operations on 28 December 2024. It is located underground at the intersection of Sanyuanli Avenue, Airport Road and Jiefang North Road in Baiyun District.

== Station Layout ==
G	-	Exits A, B, C
L1; Concourse	West lobby	Ticket Machines, Customer Service, Security Facilities
L1; Concourse	Mezzanine	Unpaid passageway between west and east lobbies
L1; Concourse	East lobby	Ticket Machines, Customer Service, Security Facilities
L2	Buffer area	Station Equipment
L3	Buffer area	Station Equipment
L4; Platforms	Platform 1	11 Outer Circle (Liuhua)
L4; Platforms	Split-island Platform, doors will open on the left
L4; Platforms		Toilets, Nursery, Passageway between platforms
L4; Platforms	Split-island Platform, doors will open on the left
L4; Platforms	Platform 2	11 Inner Circle (Guangzhou University of Chinese Medicine)

=== Entrances/exits ===
The station has 3 points of entry/exit, split between the east and west concourses. Exit C is equipped with an elevator.

==== East concourse ====
- A: Jiefang North Road
- B: Fei'e West Road, Guangzhou University of Chinese Medicine Main Gate, The First Affiliated Hospital of Guangzhou University of Chinese Medicine Main Gate

==== West concourse ====
- C: Sanyuanli Avenue, Sanyuanli Anti-British Invasion Memorial Park
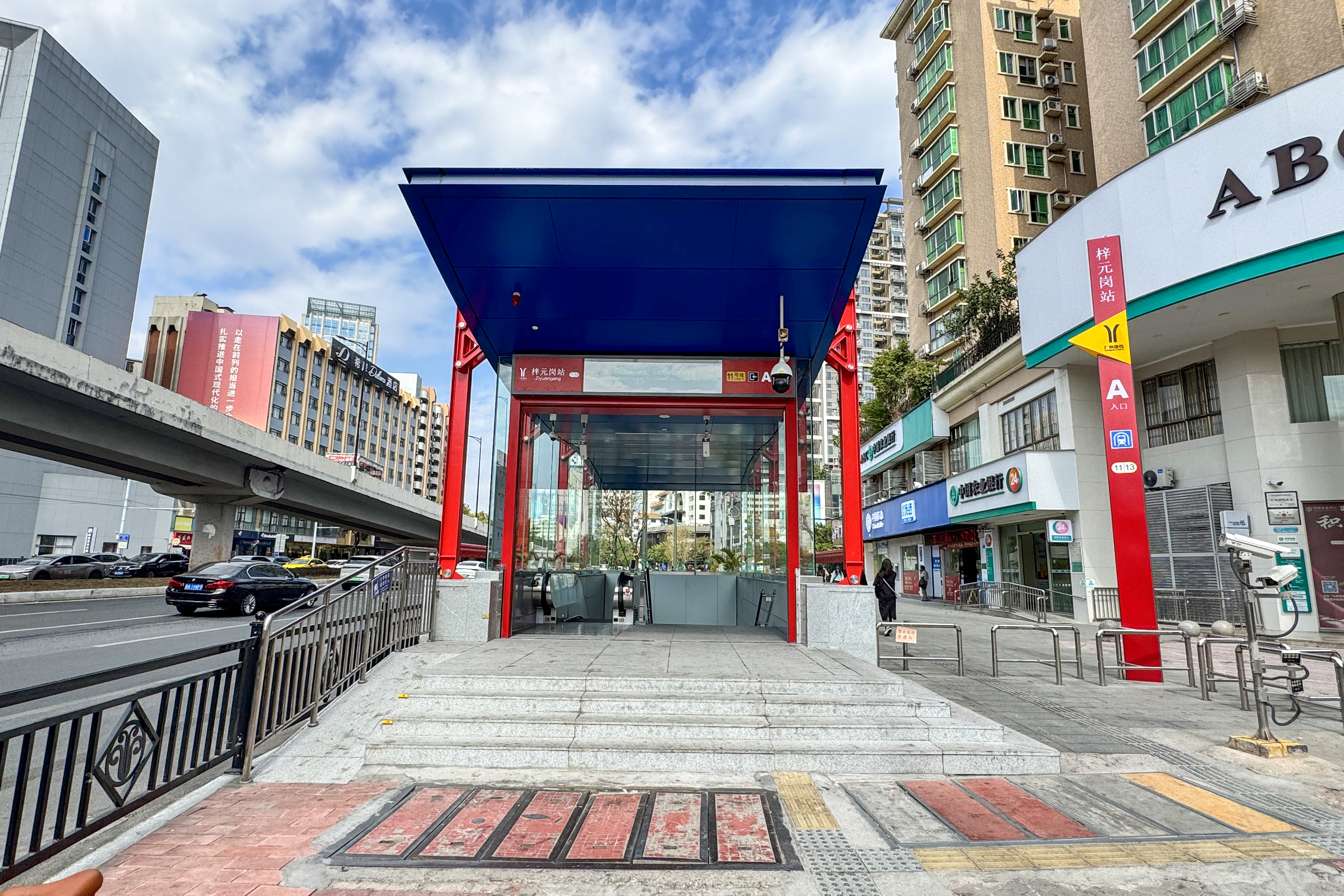
Entrance A

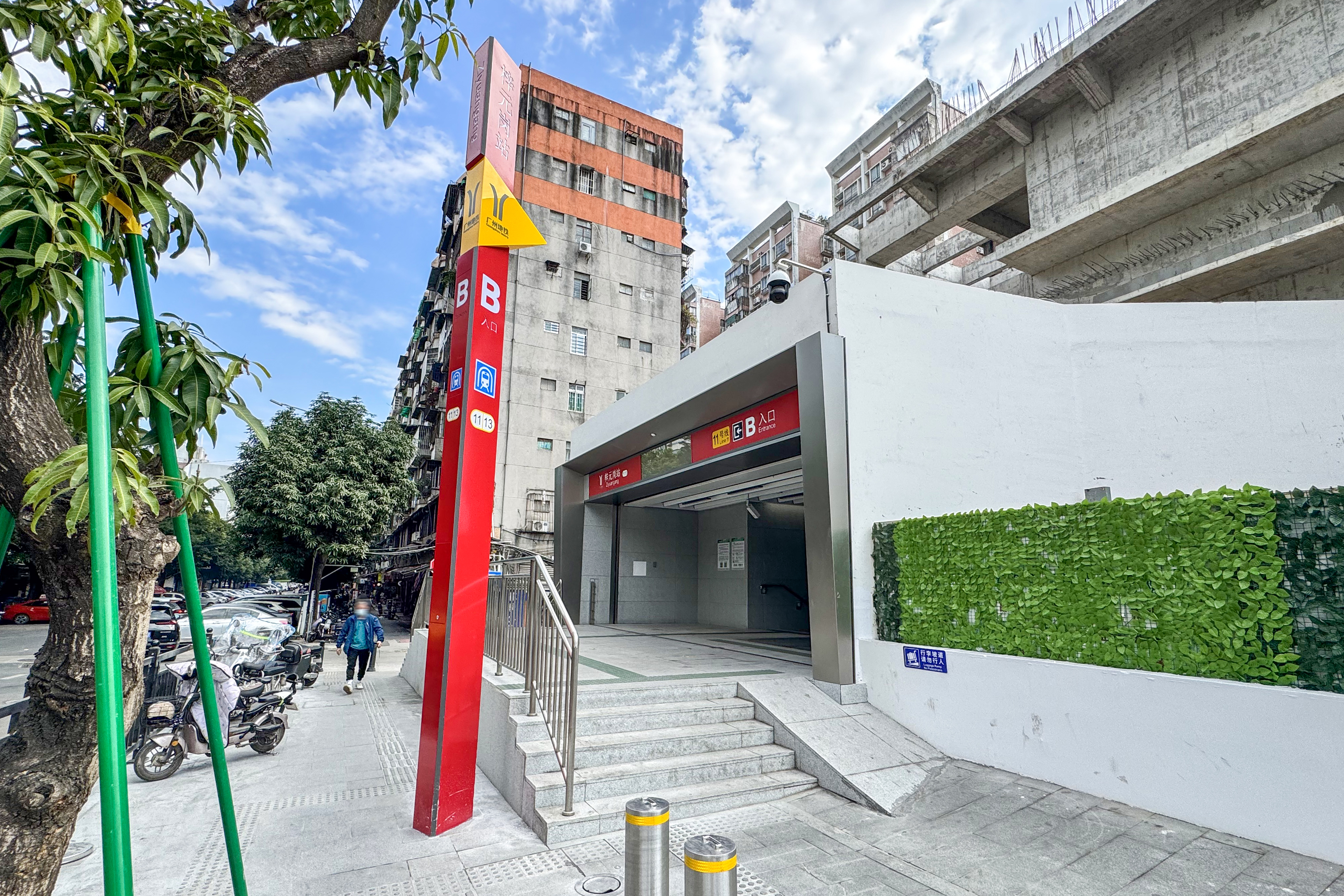
Entrance B

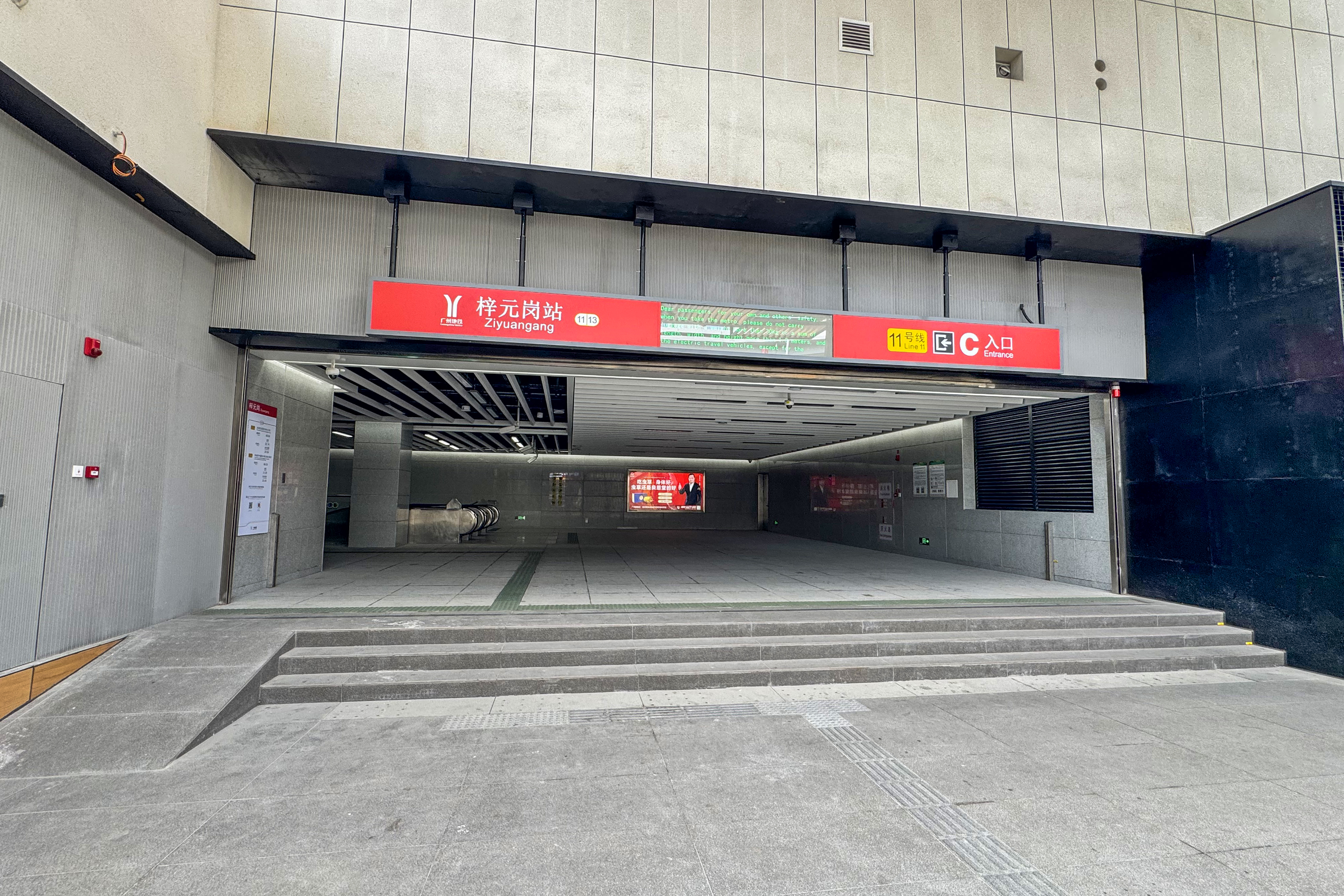
Entrance C

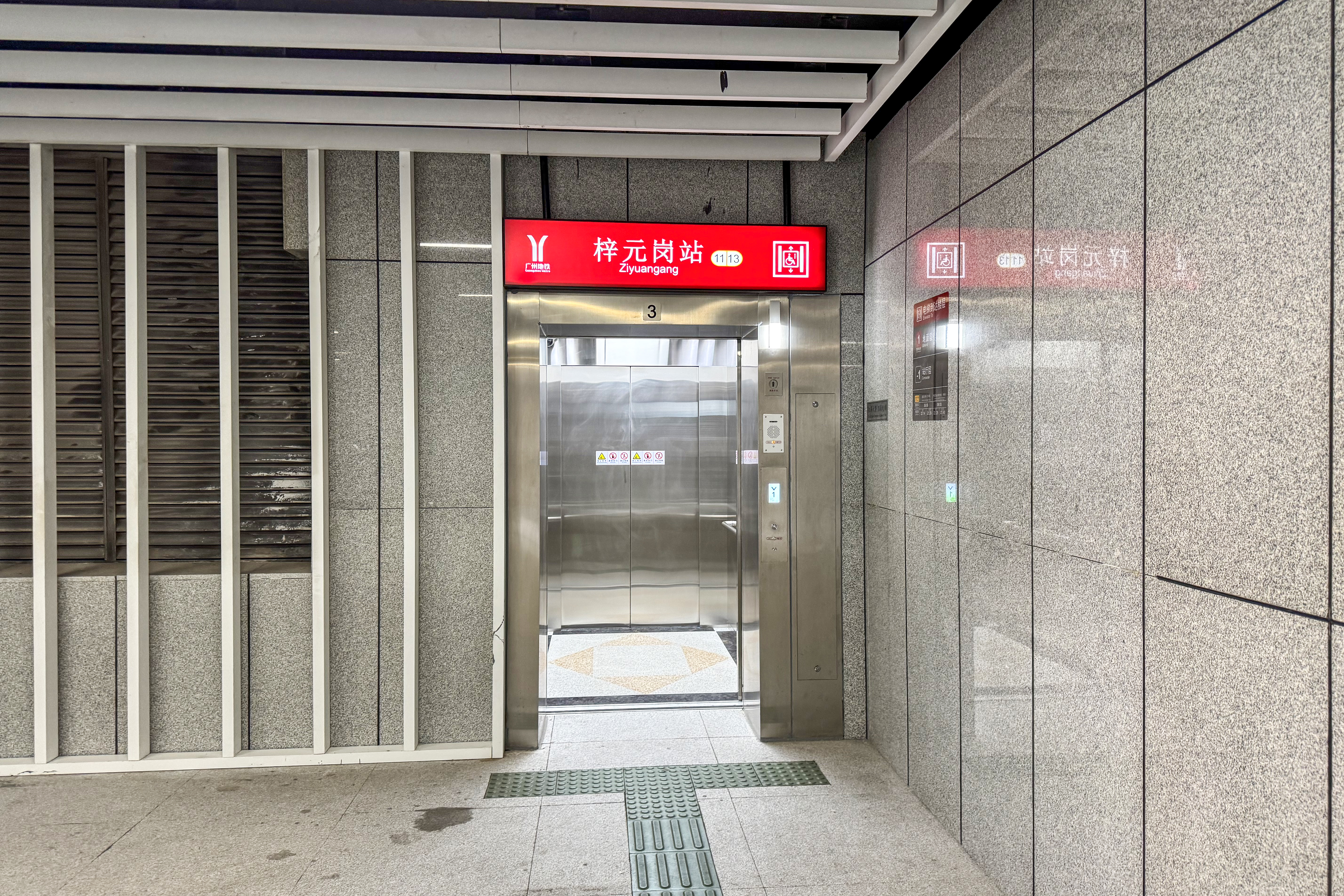
Elevator of Entrance C

== Gallery ==
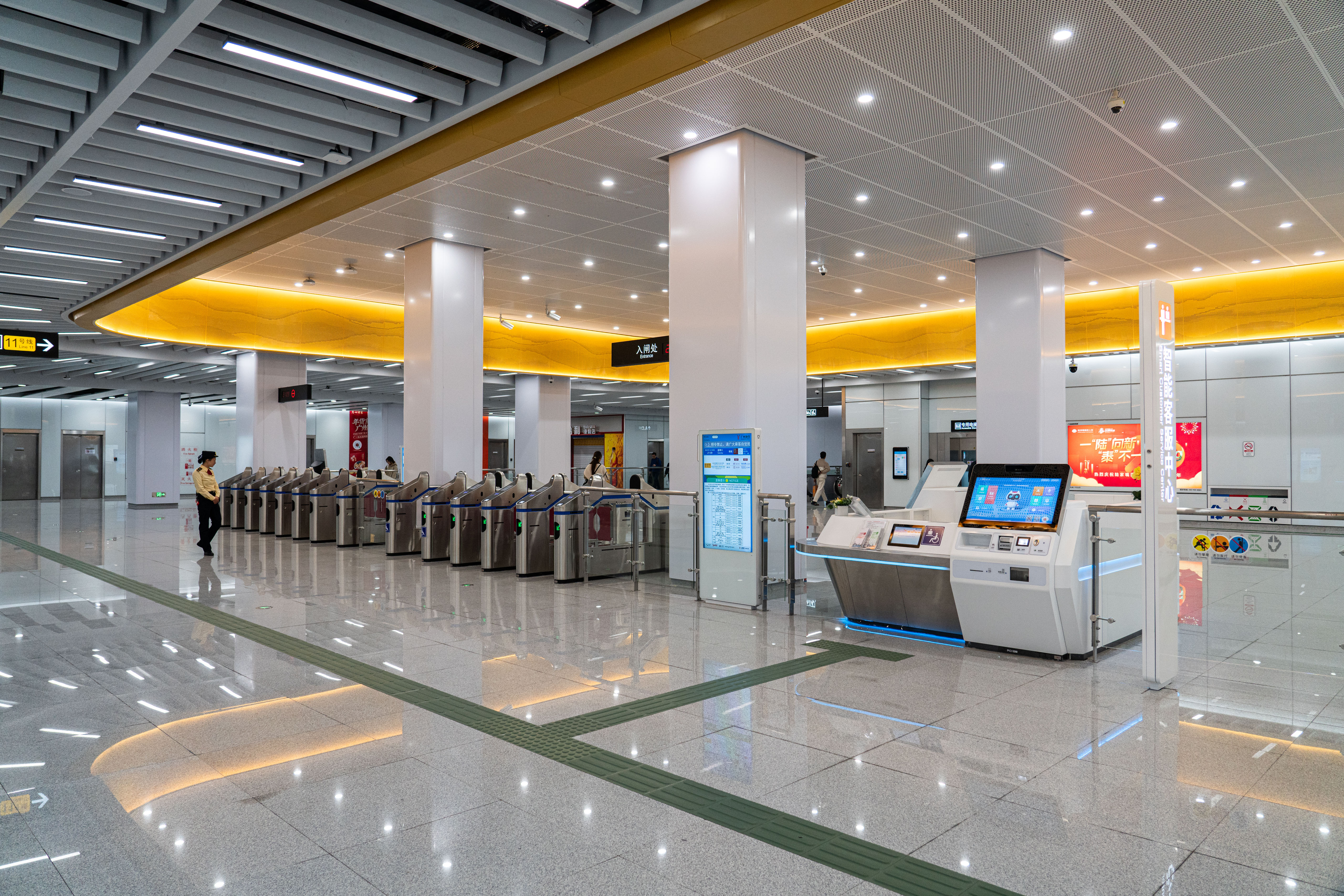
East concourse

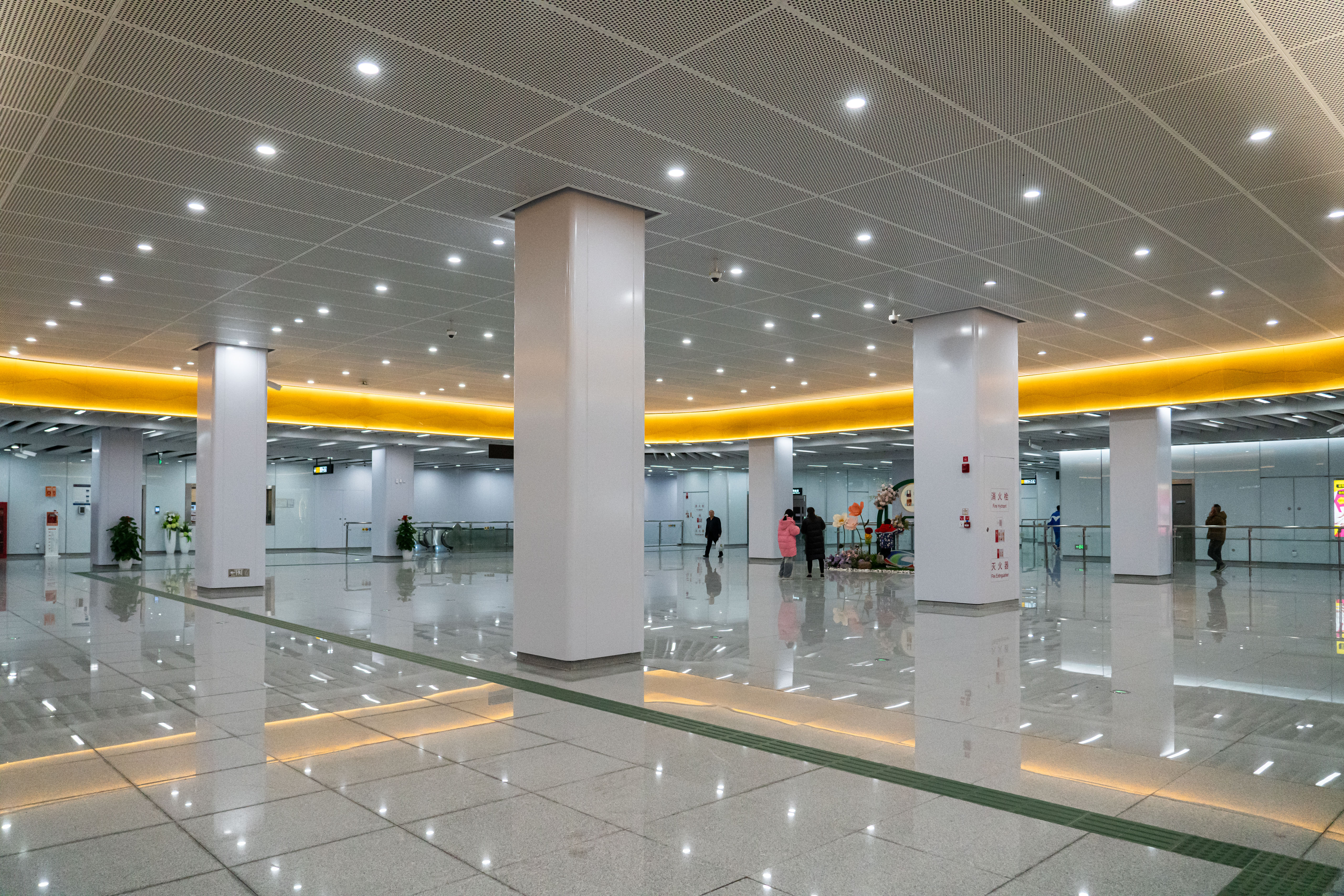
West concourse

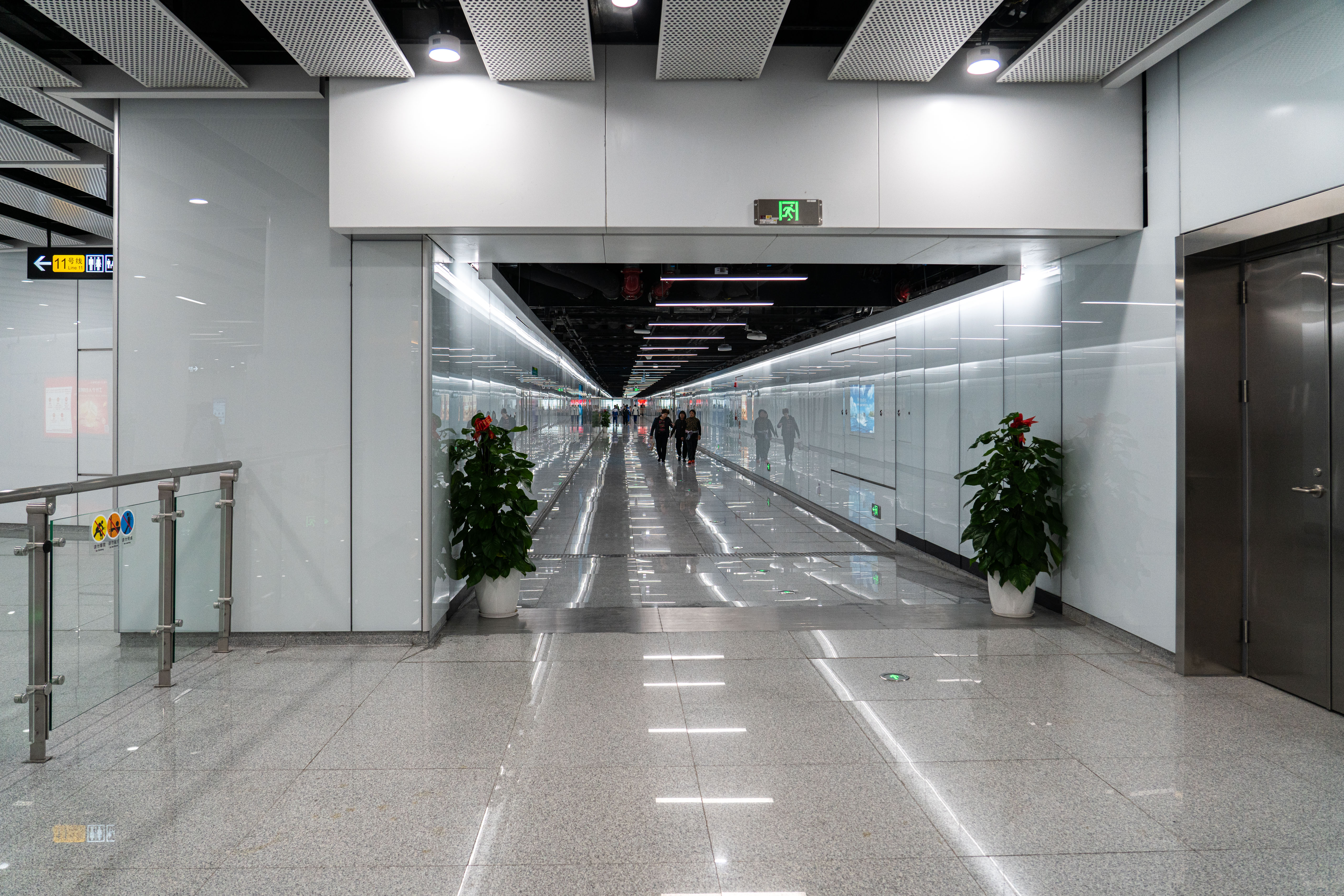
Passageway between the two concourses

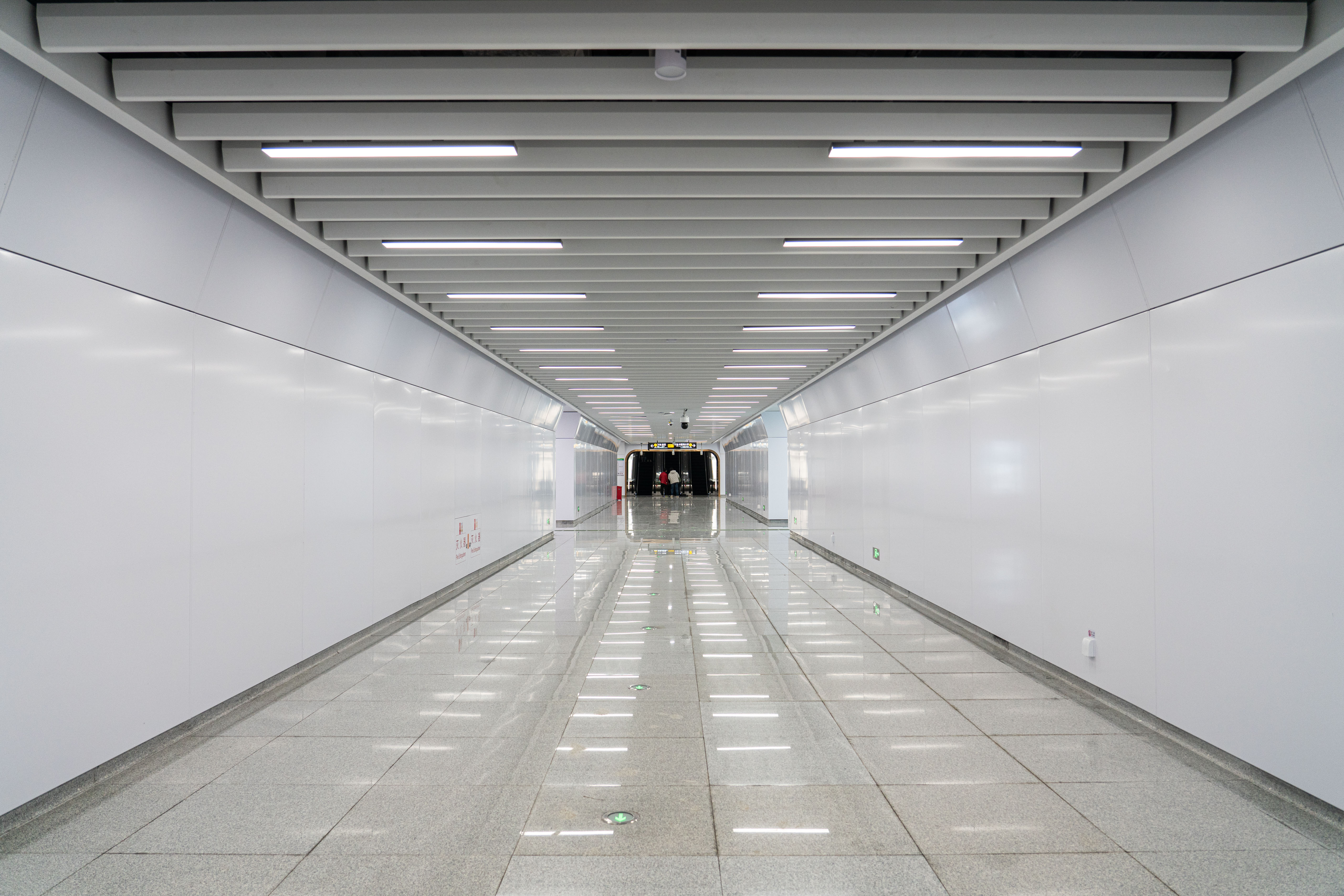
Central passageway between the platforms

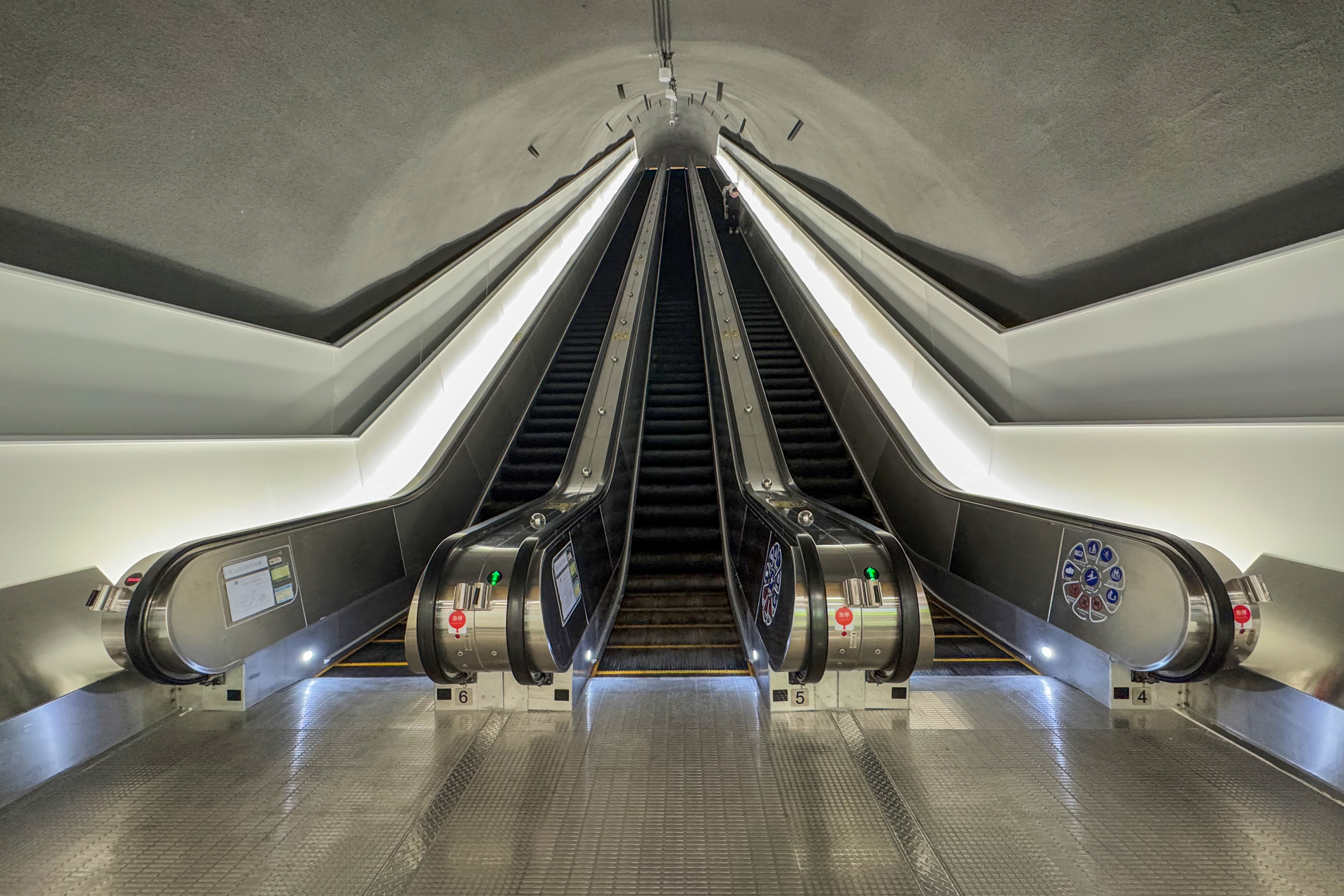
One of the escalator sets heading towards the west concourse

== History ==
The station started construction on the west concourse on 19 May 2017, where it completed the hoisting of the first diaphragm wall steel cage into the groove in July of the same year, excavated the deep foundation pit in April 2018, and the west concourse was topped out in January 2020.

On 28 December 2024, the station was put into use with the opening of Line 11.

=== East concourse expropriation and demolition complications ===
The construction of the east concourse of the station required the demolition and relocation of the Huagui Community, where 89 households had to be moved, and an area of 9,400 square meters were needed to be expropriated. On 13 September 2018, the relevant authorities of the metro issued a letter requesting comments, saying that because only 50 households had signed the agreement, and the remaining 39 households did not agree to the requisition, the demolition work had little effect, so the housing requisition party in Baiyun District believed that the time for the completion of the expropriation was uncontrollable.

The letter also mentions two treatment options: the first option is to move the station 110 meters to the west, but it is necessary to demolish three buildings in the Jinjuyuan community. The second option is to cancel the station directly, and the passenger demand will be taken care of by the subway station of Guangzhou railway station, which is less than 700 meters away. The first option requires a huge amount of expropriation and is difficult to meet, which meant it could not meet the requirements of the construction period. The relevant departments of the metro wanted to opt for the second option, but for that, passengers need to walk from Ziyuangang to Guangzhou Railway Station and metro station via Jiefang North Road and Huanshi Road West, which is 1.4 kilometers and takes 20 minutes.

However, after the letter was posted, the demolition work made great progress. In mid-October 2018, the staff said that the relocation work was actually nearing completion, with more than 90% of the households having signed expropriation agreements and less than 10 households still in communication. When the New Express (新快报) reporter went to cover the agreement in mid-November, there were only four households left that had not signed the agreement. Finally, the demolition of the Ziyuangang Station site was initiated on 31 May 2019. The last resident of the demolition area was also contracted at a later date, and construction of the east concourse was able to commence.

=== Station name dispute ===
On 25 June 2023, the Guangzhou Civil Affairs Bureau announced the initial naming of the station, which is consistent with the construction project name of "Ziyuangang". The explanation of the relevant departments is that according to the relevant regulations, the site is named after Ziyuangang (the name of the area). However, some citizens think that the station is more suitable to be named Guihuagang Station. Compared with Ziyuangang, Guihuagang is more well-known. The traffic radio station usually uses "Jie (Fang) North (Road) Guihuagang Road Section" to broadcast the road conditions in the area where the station is located, and the bus stop names around the subway station are also named after "Guihuagang" and "Sanyuanli Avenue", and there is no relevant name of Ziyuangang. According to a poll initiated by the radio's self-media, nearly seventy percent of the respondents suggested choosing Guihuagang as the station name. A month later, the Civil Affairs Bureau issued a statement for soliciting opinions, acknowledging that the public's suggestion that the site should be named "Guihuagang" and "Zoumagang" has a certain degree of reasonableness, and is working with relevant departments to conduct in-depth research and demonstration. However, the authorities did not adopt the relevant proposal to change the name, and the station was named Ziyuangang station in May 2024.

=== Construction incident ===
At 9:00 on 16 December 2024, a fire broke out in the cooling tower of the station. Guangzhou Metro reported that when the exterior finish of the cooling tower was installed, smoke appeared from the filling material of the cooling tower on the side, which did not cause casualties and did not affect the equipment and commissioning work of Line 11.

== Future development ==
Line 24 is planned to stop at this station, which will interchange with Line 11.

The station of Line 24 is planned to be built on the south side of the intersection of Sanyuanli Avenue and Airport Road, laying along the north-south direction of Jiefang North Road, and can interchange with Line 11 using a transfer node. The station is a 6-storey open-cut construction station, with a total length of 175.60m, a standard section width of 23.2m, and a total construction area of 29,835.93 square meters, with a total of 3 entrances and exits and 3 sets of wind shafts.
