= Liuhua station =

Guangzhou Metro Line 11 station

Liuhua 流花
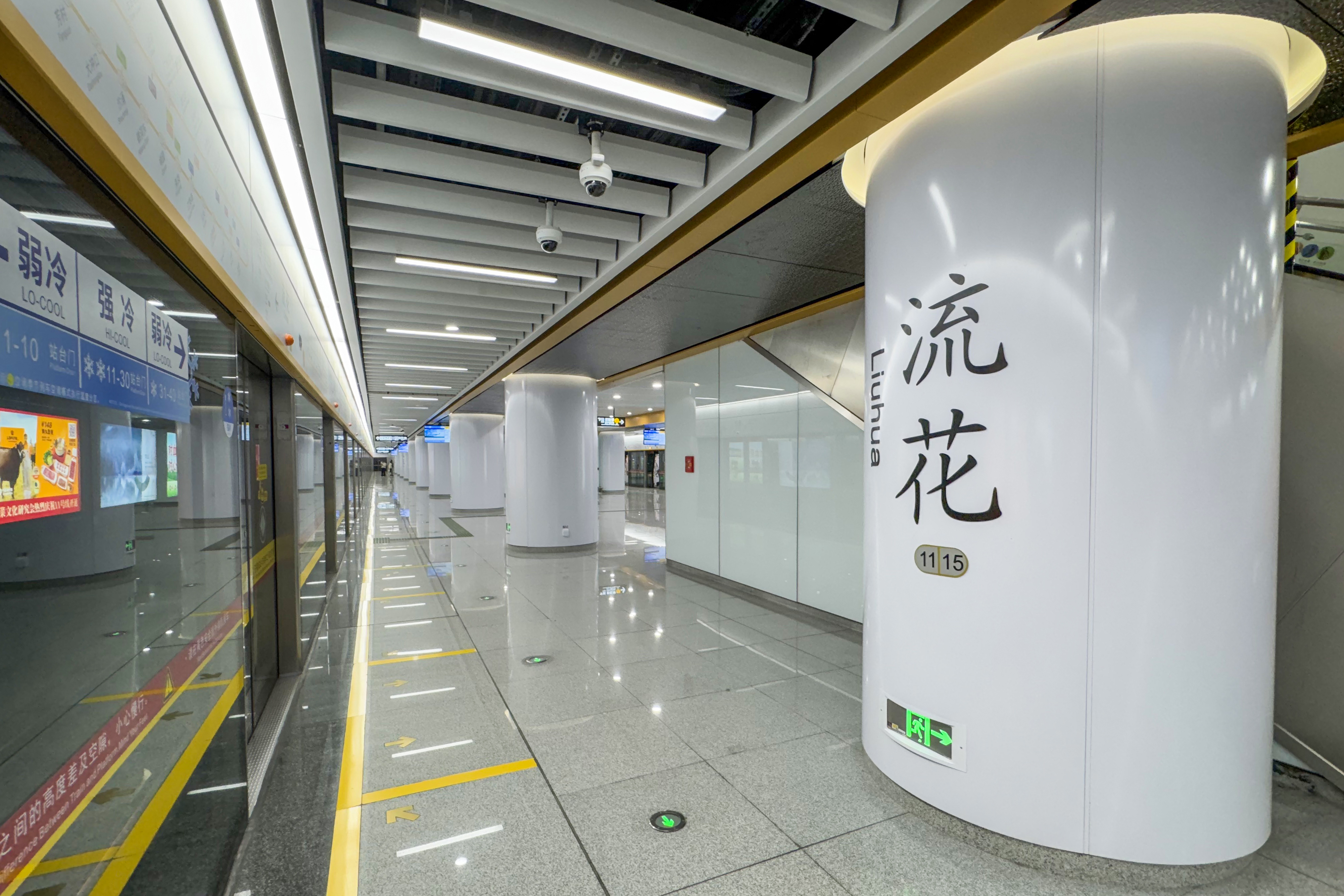
- Platform

Chinese name
- Chinese: 流花站
Transcriptions
Standard Mandarin
- Hanyu Pinyin: Liúhuā Zhàn
Yue: Cantonese
- Yale Romanization: Làufā Jaahm
- Jyutping: Lau^{4}faa^{1} Zaam^{6}

General information
- Location: Intersection of Renmin North Road (人民北路) and Liuhua Road (流花路), Liuhua Subdistrict; Yuexiu District, Guangzhou, Guangdong; China
- Coordinates: 23°8′34.26″N 113°15′6.59″E
- Operator: Guangzhou Metro Co. Ltd.
- Line: Line 11
- Platforms: 2 (1 island platform)
- Tracks: 2

Construction
- Structure type: Underground
- Accessible: Yes

Other information
- Station code: 1115

History
- Opened: 28 December 2024 (19 months ago)

Services
Preceding station	Guangzhou Metro	Following station
Caihong Bridge Outer Circle	Line 11	Ziyuangang Inner Circle
Location

Liuhua Station (Chinese: 流花站; pinyin: Liúhuā Zhàn; Cantonese Yale: Làufā Jaahm) is a station on Line 11 of the Guangzhou Metro. It started operations on 28 December 2024. It is located underground at the intersection of Renmin Road North and Liuhua Road in Yuexiu District.

== Structure ==
In order to reduce the impact of the construction on the ground traffic, the station introduced the tunnel pile method for construction, which is the first station of Guangzhou Metro to adopt this method for construction, and the only fully excavated station of Line 11.

== Station Layout ==
G	-	Exits B & D
L1	Lobby	Ticket Machines, Customer Service, Shops, Police Station, Security Facilities
L2; Platforms	Platform 1	11 Outer Circle (Caihong Bridge)
L2; Platforms	Island platform, doors will open on the left (Toilets, Nursery)
L2; Platforms	Platform 2	11 Inner Circle (Ziyuangang)

=== Entrances/exits ===
The station has 2 points of entry/exit. Exit D is equipped with an elevator. In addition, there is a passage connecting the entrances/exits on the first basement floor, which serves as a crossing passage for the public to cross Renmin North Road without passing through the concourse.

- B: Liuhua Road, Liuhua Lake Park, Southern Theater General Hospital, Guangzhou Medical University Yuexiu Campus
- D: Liuhua Road, Oriental Hotel, China Hotel
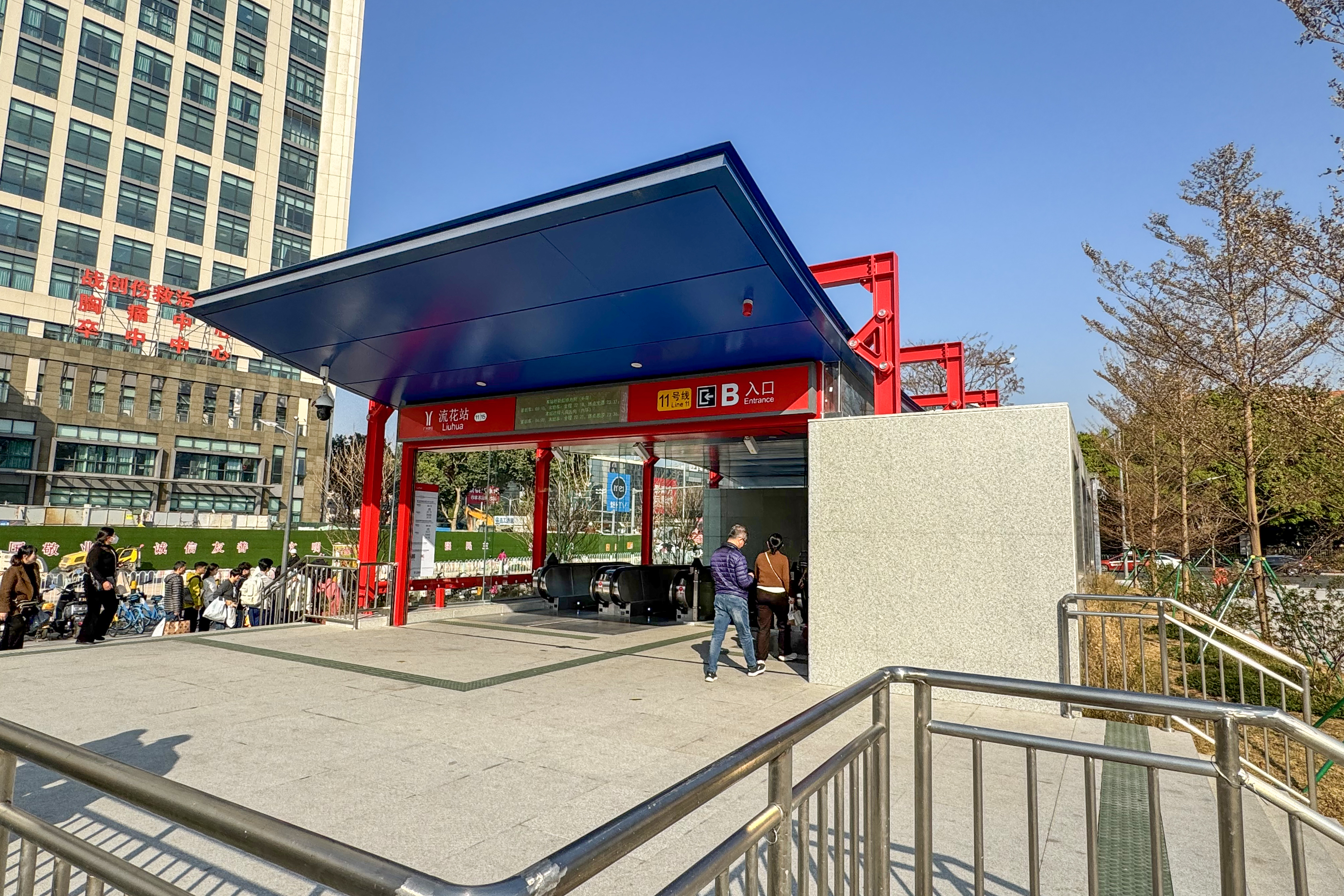
Entrance B

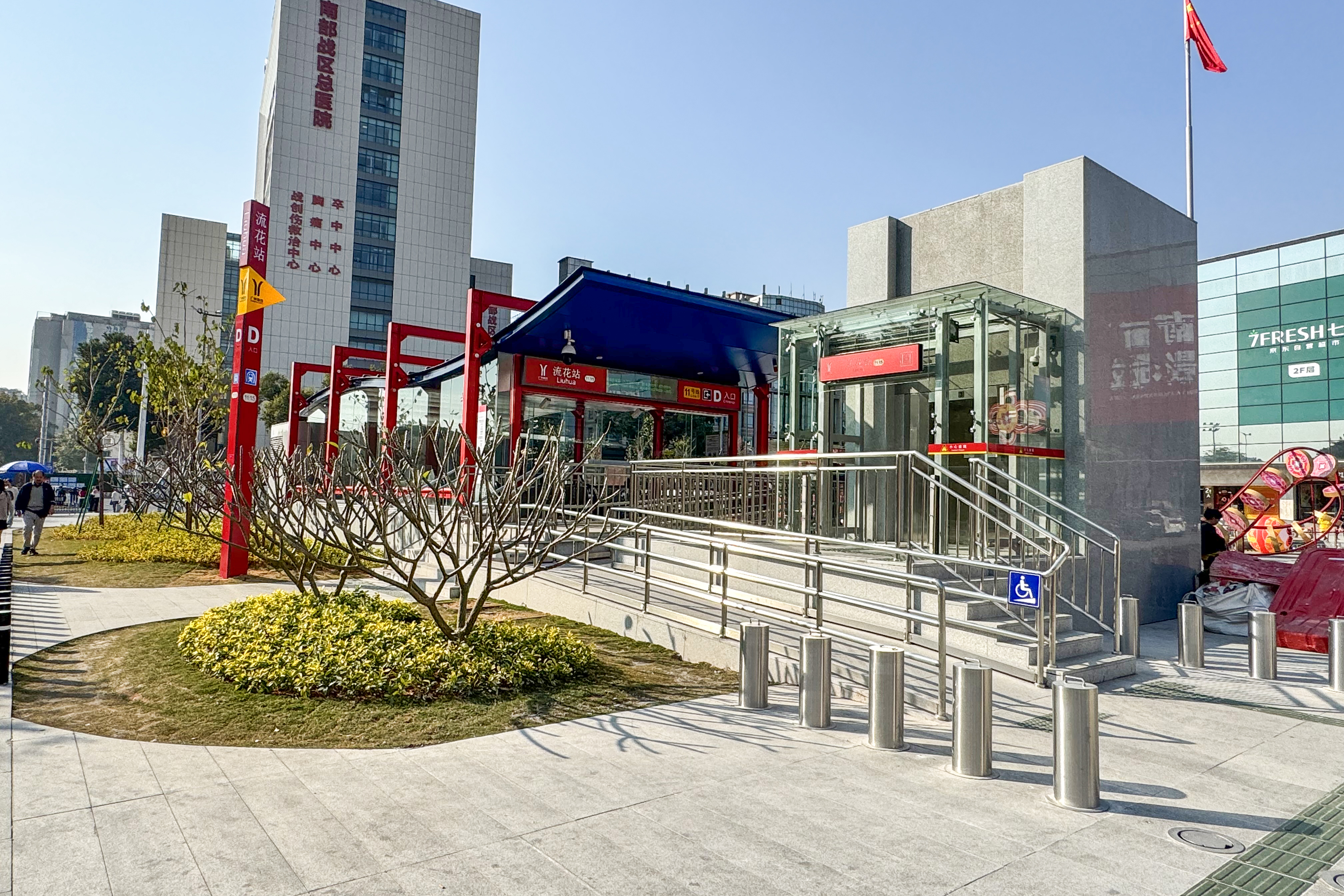
Entrance D

== Gallery ==
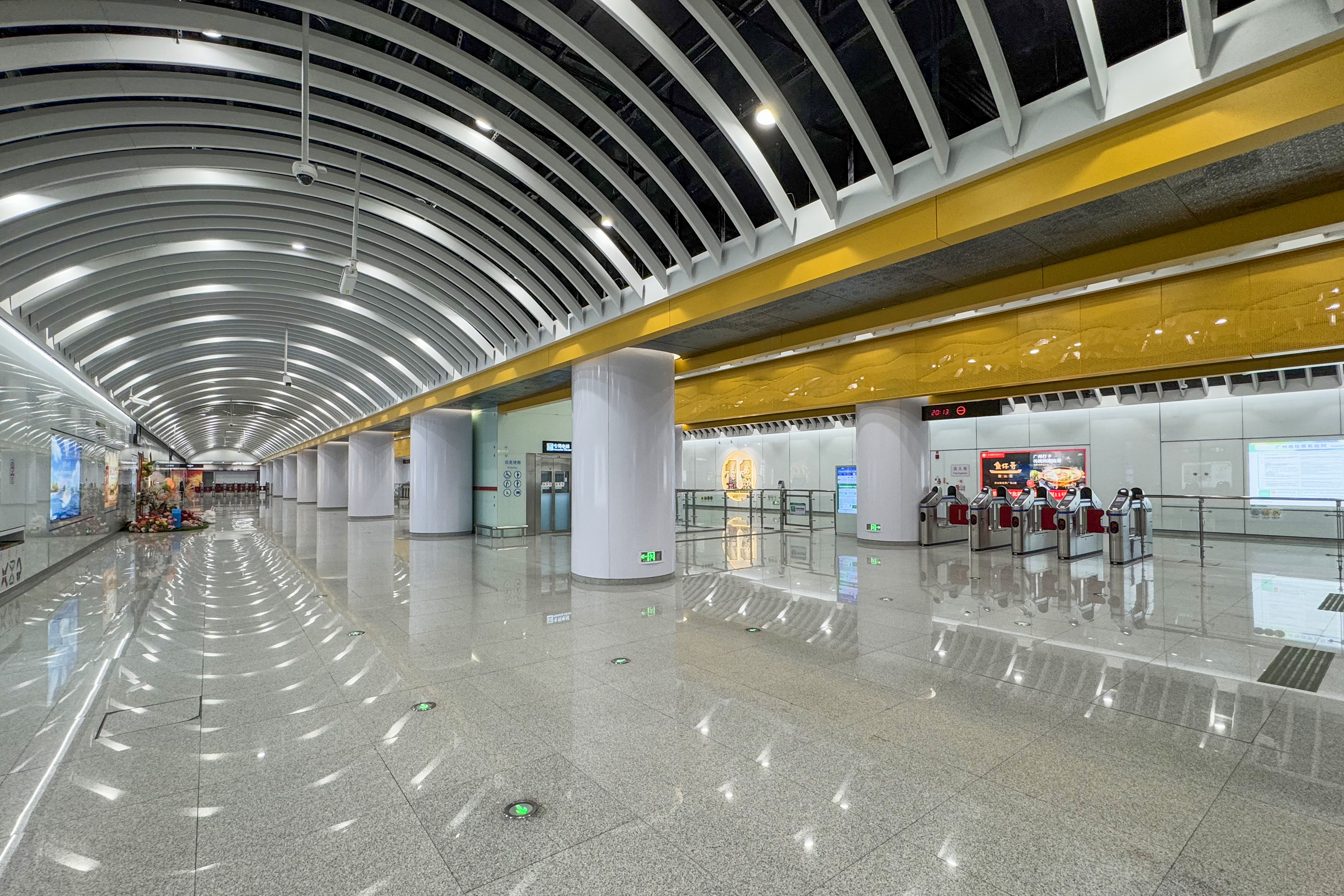
Concourse

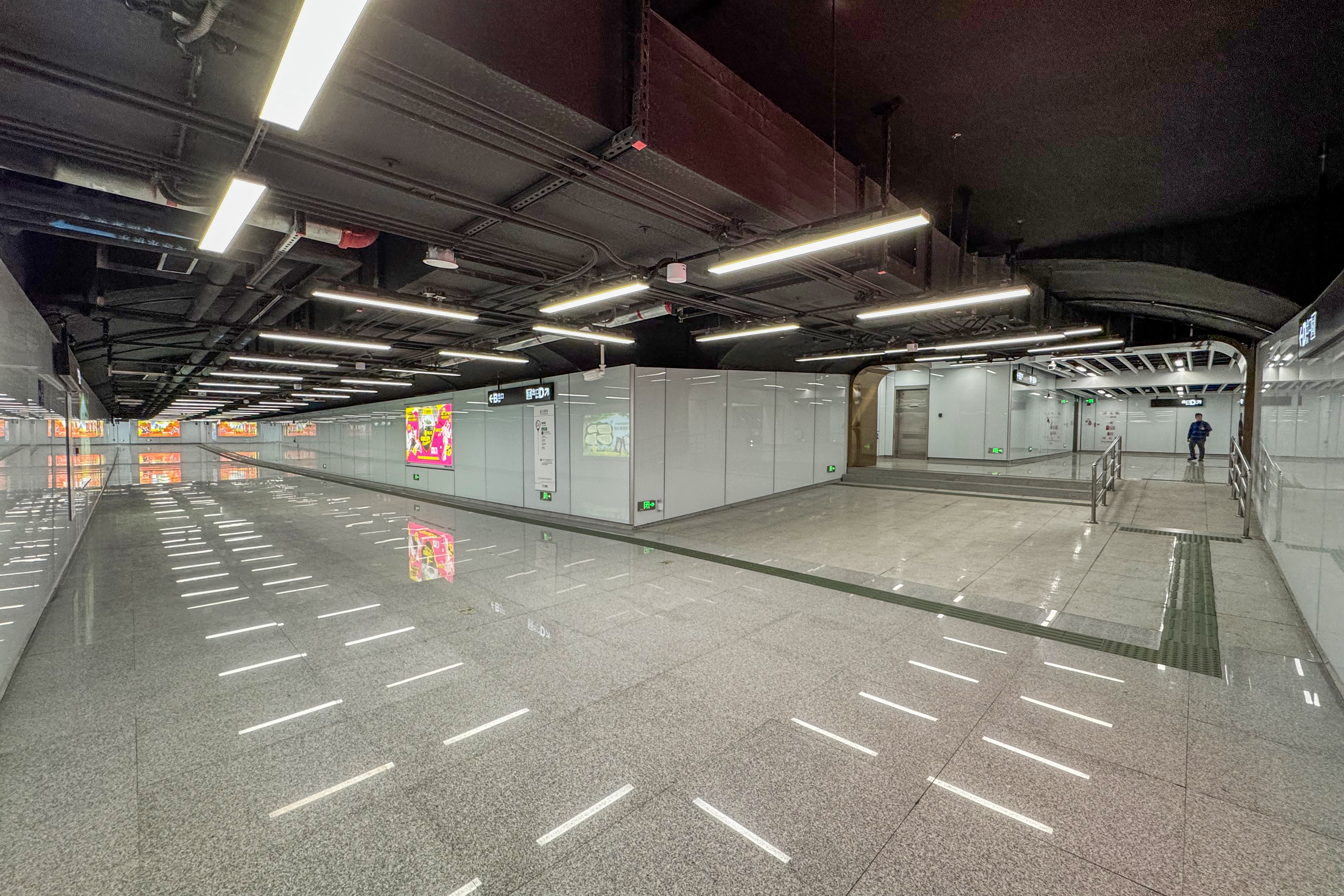
Exits B and D linking passageway

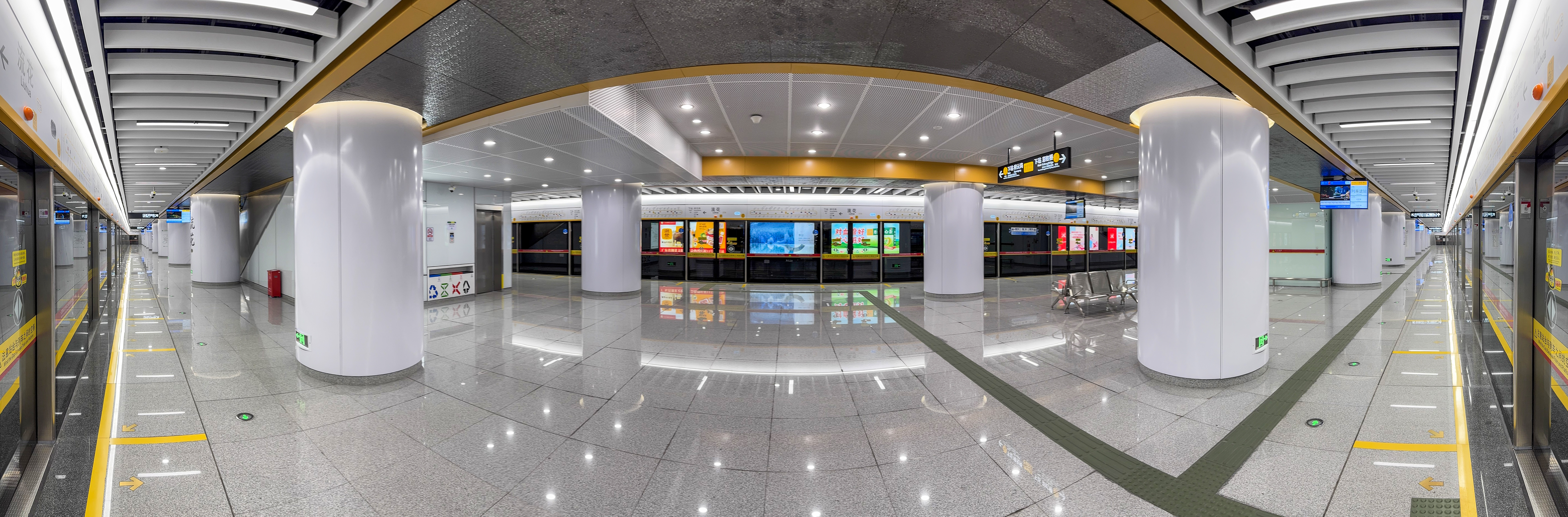
Platform 1 panorama

== History ==
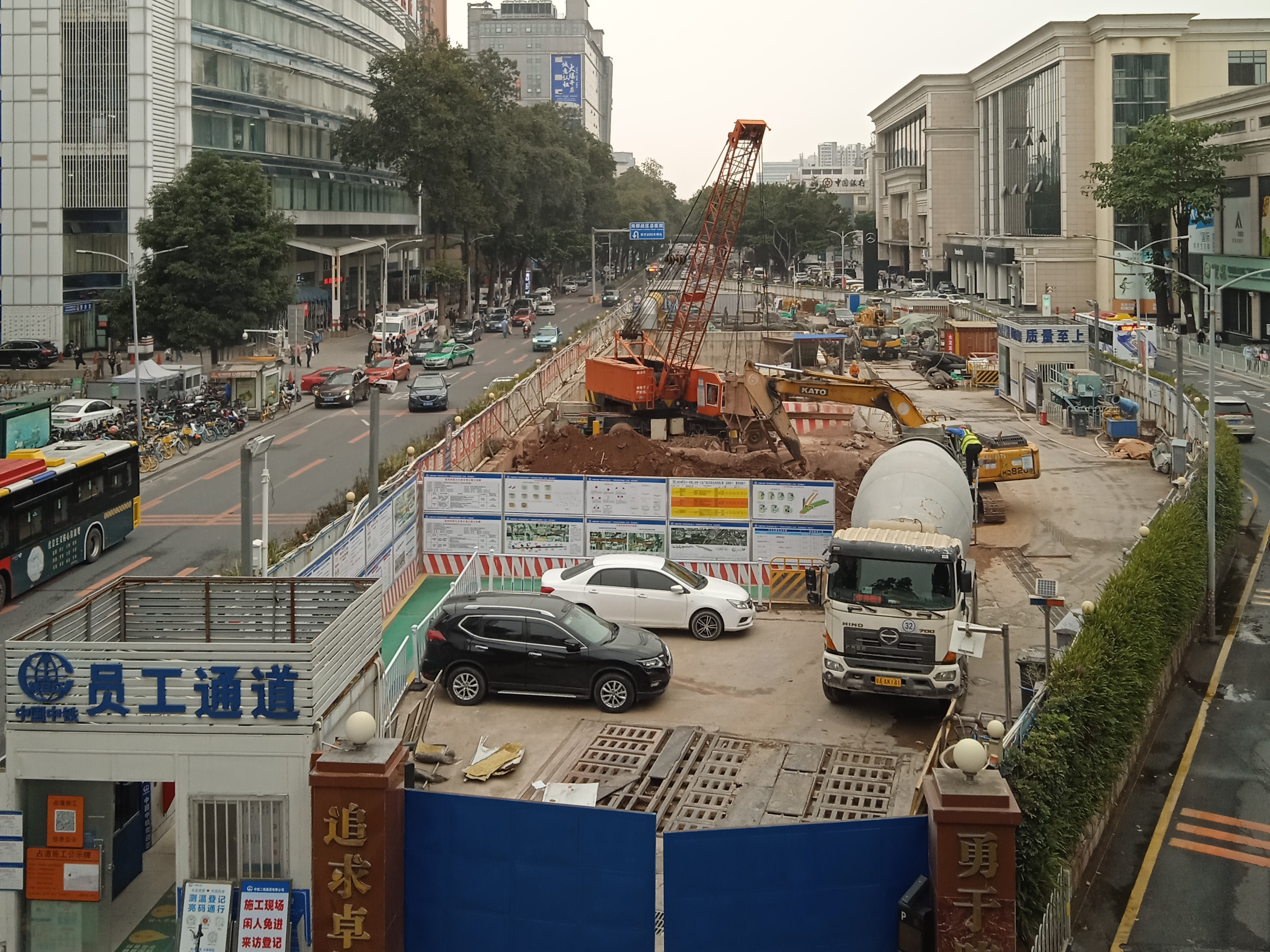
Construction site (February 2023)

In 2008, when the subway planned the metro ring line, the small ring line was planned to run through Renmin Road North with Liuhua Road station (also known as Liuhua Park station), which was already located in much the same location as it is now. However, the Great Ring Line scheme does not set up this station because the route directly passes beneath Zhanqian Road. In 2010, it was decided to adopt the Super Ring Line scheme, using Renmin Road North at the section from Caihong Bridge Station to Guangzhou railway station, and officially establishing Liuhua Road Station.

Construction of the station began in February 2017. On May 21 of the same year, the bus stop (northbound) on Renmin Road North (Zhannan Road Intersection) was relocated 200 meters north to cooperate with the construction. On 23 April 2023, the main structure of the station was topped out. In June 2023, Guangzhou Metro Group announced the preliminary name of the stations on Line 11, and this station is planned to be named Liuhua station, which was subsequently approved as the official station name in May 2024.

On 28 December 2024, the station was put into use with the opening of Line 11.
