= Guangzhou railway station =

Chinese railway and metro interchange station

Guangzhou 广州
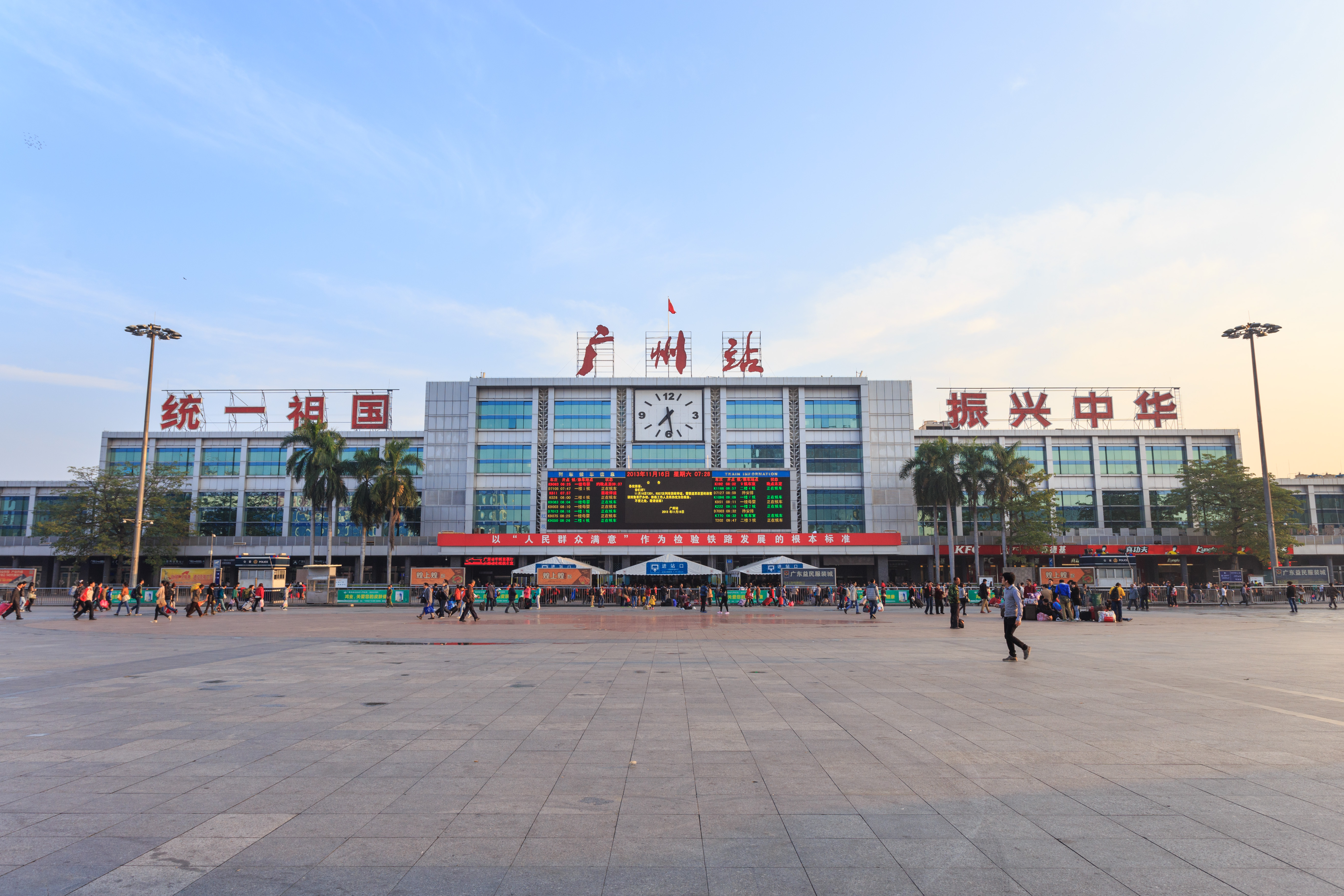

Chinese name
- Simplified Chinese: 广州站
- Traditional Chinese: 廣州站
- Postal: Canton station
Transcriptions
Standard Mandarin
- Hanyu Pinyin: Guǎngzhōu Zhàn
Yue: Cantonese
- Yale Romanization: Gwóngjāu Jaahm
- Jyutping: Gwong2zau1 Zaam6

General information
- Location: 159 Huanshi Xilu, Yuexiu District, Guangzhou, Guangdong; China
- Coordinates: 23°08′58″N 113°15′26″E
- Operator: CR Guangzhou; Guangzhou Metro
- Lines: China Railway: Beijing–Guangzhou railway; Guangzhou–Maoming railway; China Railway High-speed: Guangzhou–Shenzhen railway; Guangzhou Metro: 2 5; 11 14 22 (future)
- Platforms: 8 (2 island platforms, 2 side platforms); 4 (2 island platforms)
- Tracks: 8; 4
- Connections: Bus terminal (closed at 31 Dec 2024 due to the station renovation)

Construction
- Structure type: Surface; Underground
- Accessible: Yes

Other information
- Station code: China Railway: TMIS code: 23693; Telegraph code: GZQ; Pinyin code: GZH; Metro: 216 ( Line 2); 506 ( Line 5); 1114 ( Line 11); 1401 ( Line 14)
- Classification: Top Class station

History
- Opened: 1974; 52 years ago 29 December 2002; 23 years ago (Metro Line 2); 28 December 2009; 16 years ago (Metro Line 5)
- Former names: Liuhuaqiao railway station

Services
| Preceding station | China Railway | Following station |
|---|---|---|
| Guangzhou Baiyun towards Beijing West | Beijing–Guangzhou railway | Terminus |
| Terminus | Guangzhou–Shenzhen railway | Yunlu towards Shenzhen |
| Preceding station | Guangzhou Metro | Following station |
| Yuexiu Park towards Guangzhou South Railway Station | Line 2 | Sanyuanli towards Jiahewanggang |
| Xicun towards Jiaokou | Line 5 | Xiaobei towards Huangpu New Port |
Line 11 does not stop here
Future services
| Liuhua Outer Circle | Line 11 | Ziyuangang Inner Circle |
| Terminus | Line 14 | Lejia Road towards Dongfeng or Zhenlong |
| Guangzhou Baiyun Railway Station towards Airport North (Terminal 2) | Line 22 | Caihong Bridge towards Panyu Square |
Location

Guangzhou railway station (simplified Chinese: 广州站; traditional Chinese: 廣州站; pinyin: Guǎngzhōu Zhàn; Jyutping: gwong2 zau1 zaam6; Cantonese Yale: Gwóngjāu jaahm) serves the city of Guangzhou. It sits on the higher speed Guangshen railway just west of Guangzhou East. CRH trains stopping at Guangzhou exist to serve Shenzhen.

Services from this station include trains to Beijing (Jingguang railway) and Lhasa. It is served by the Guangzhou Metro on Line 2 and Line 5.

== History ==
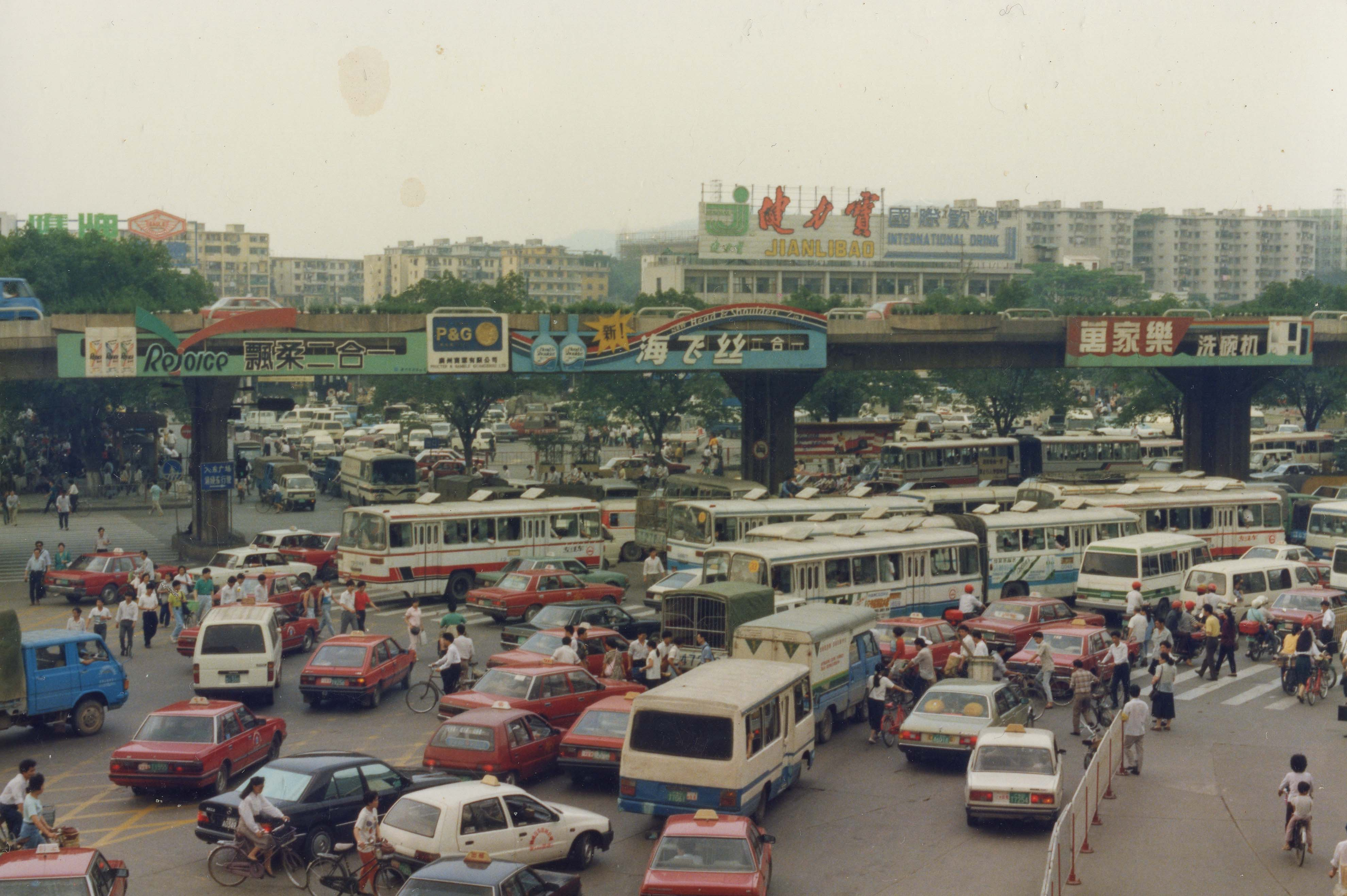
The east square of Guangzhou railway station in 1991

The first central railway station in Guangzhou, known as East Canton Railway Station or Dashatou railway station, was built in 1911 as the northern terminus of the Kowloon-Canton Railway.

In the 1950s, the Guangdong provincial government saw the need for a new central train station in Guangzhou to meet the increasing demands for rail travels. Construction began in 1960, but it was not completed until 1974 due to interruptions by the Great Leap Forward and the Cultural Revolution.

On April 4, 1979, with the normalisation of relations with Hong Kong, the through-train service that was suspended for over twenty-five years was resumed. Through-train services were moved to Guangzhou East in 1996.

== Rail services ==
- Beijing–Guangzhou Railway
- Guangzhou–Shenzhen Railway
- Guangzhou–Maoming Railway

== Metro services ==
An interchange station between Line 2 and Line 5 of the Guangzhou Metro. It is located at the underground of the west square of Guangzhou Railway Station, located at the junction of Ring Road West (Chinese: 环市西路; pinyin: Huánshì Xī Lù; Jyutping: waan4 si5 sai1 lou6 and Renmin Road North (人民北路; Rénmín Běi Lù; jan4 man4 bak1 lou6) in Yuexiu District. It started operations on December 29, 2002, (Line 2) and December 28, 2009 (Line 5) respectively. Its area is about 10,000 square meters (107,639 sq ft) and it is the second largest metro station in Guangzhou.

== Gallery (Metro) ==
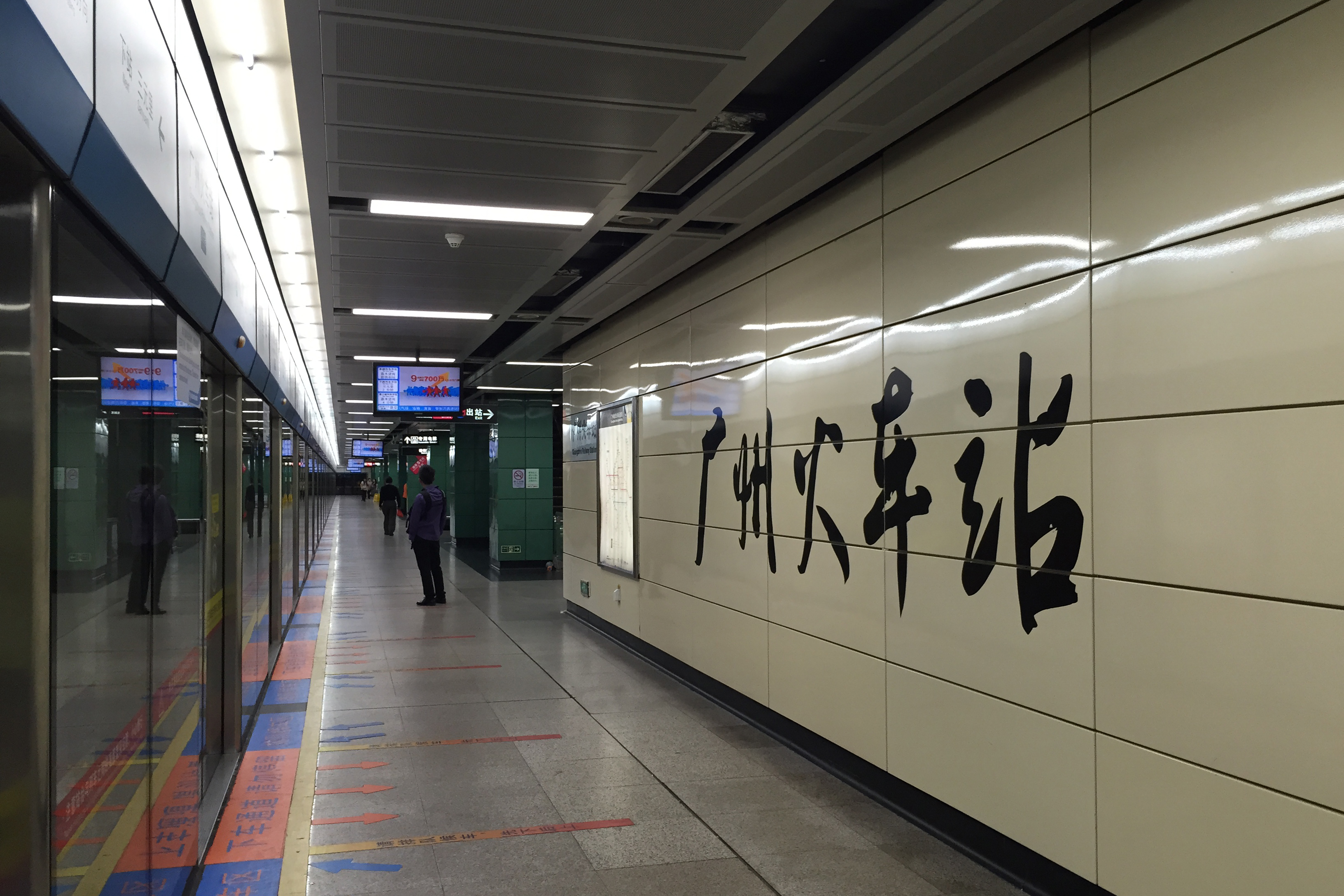
Platform 1 (Line 2 towards Jiahewanggang)

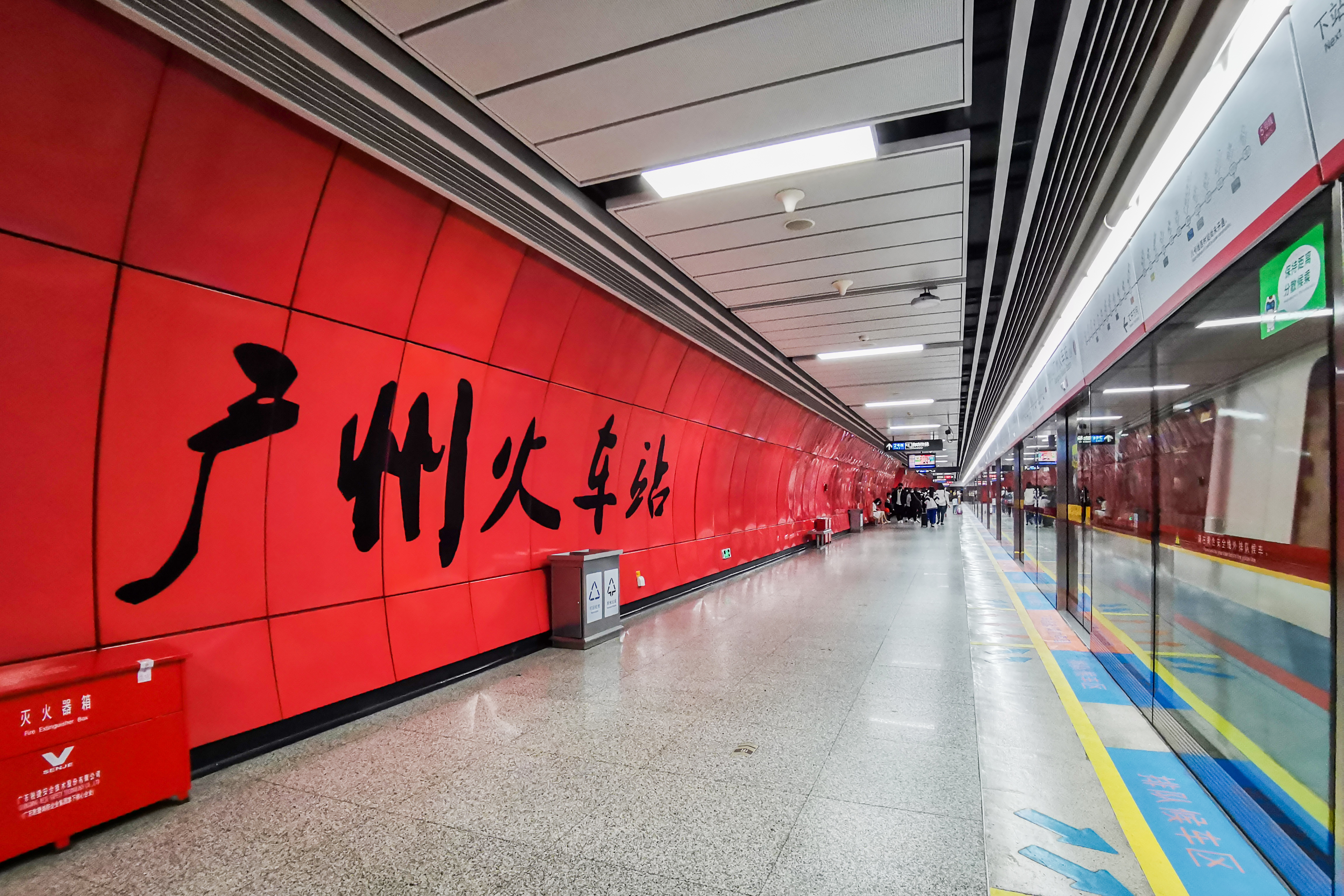
Platform 3 (Line 5 towards Huangpu New Port)

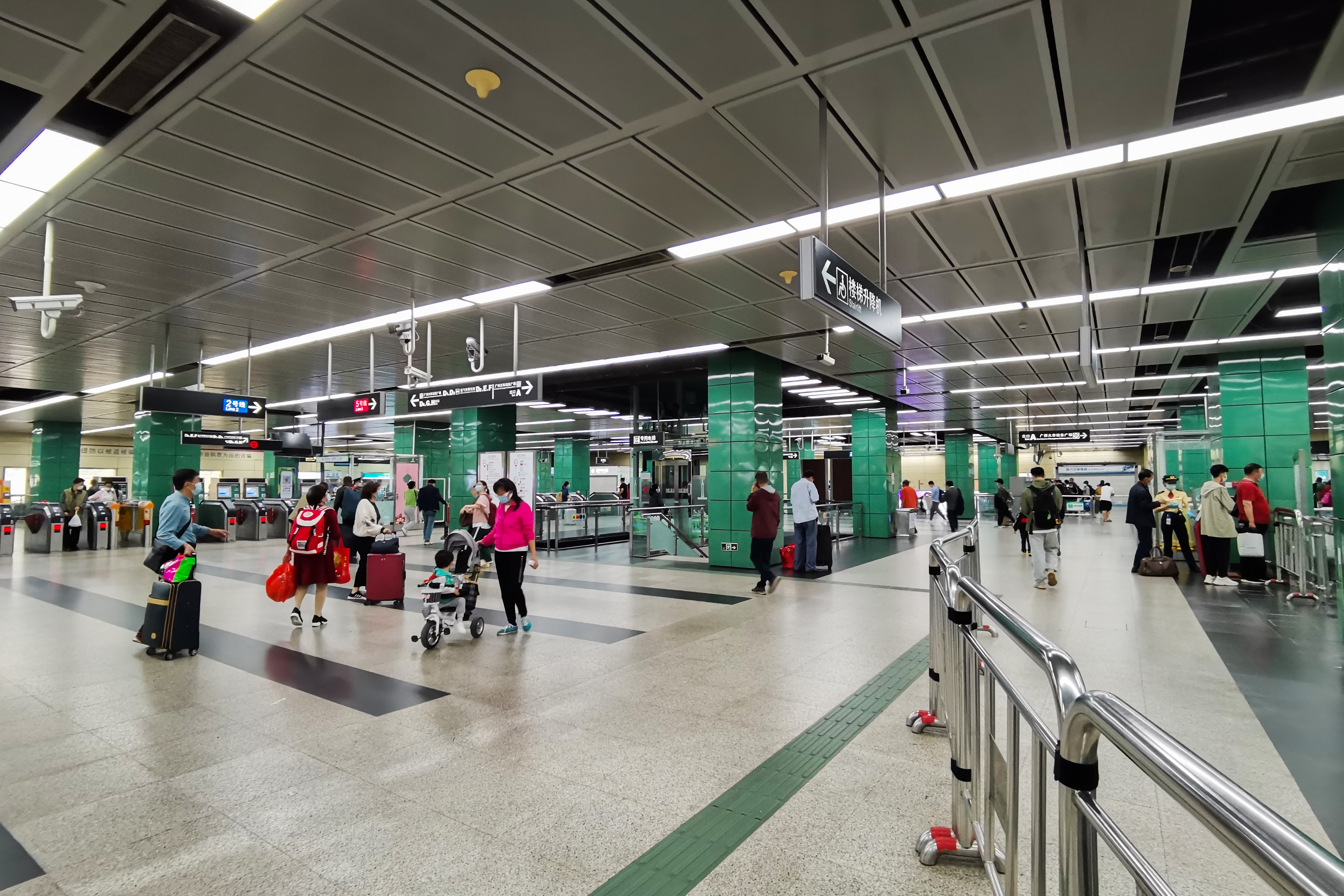
Line 2 concourse

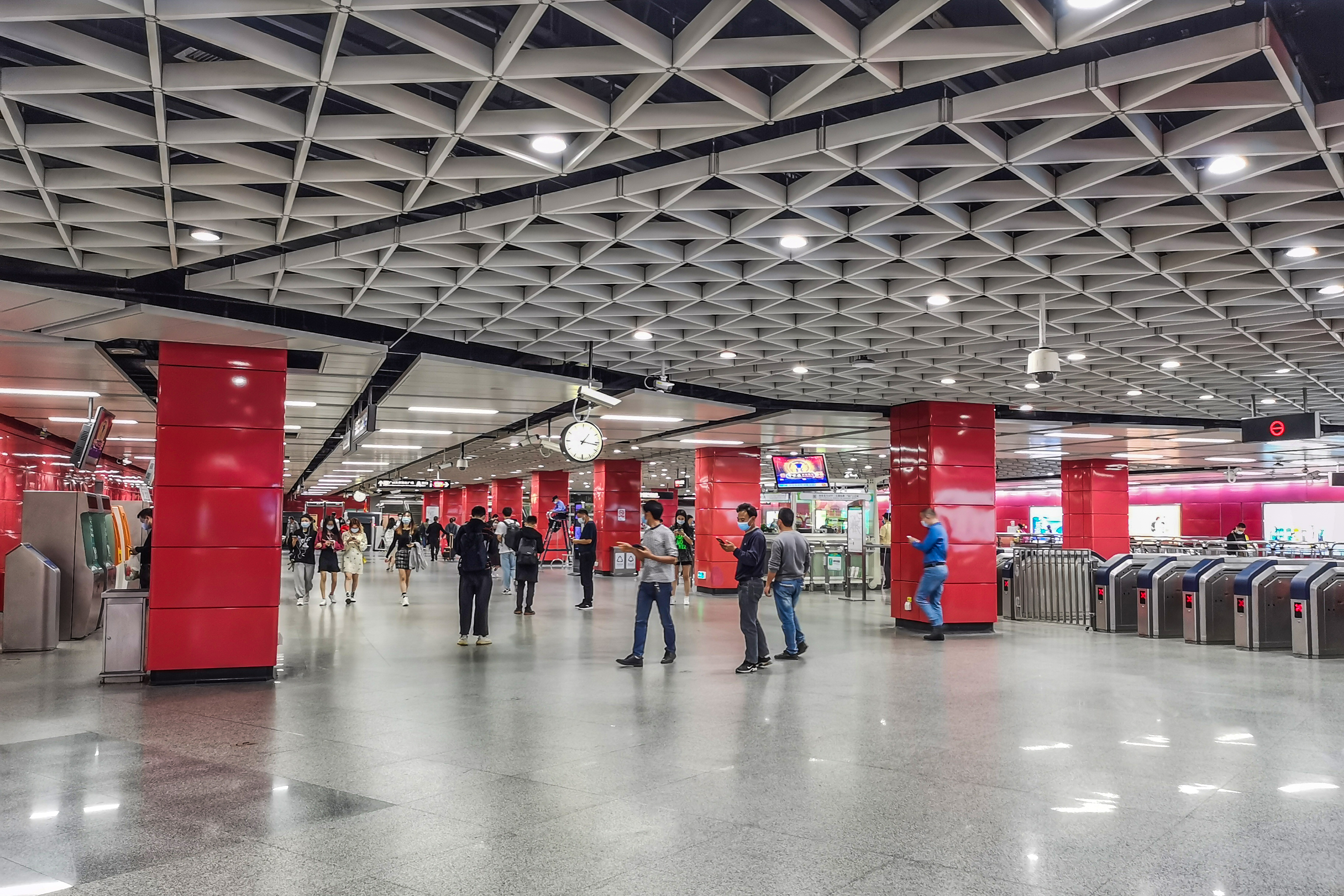
Line 5 concourse

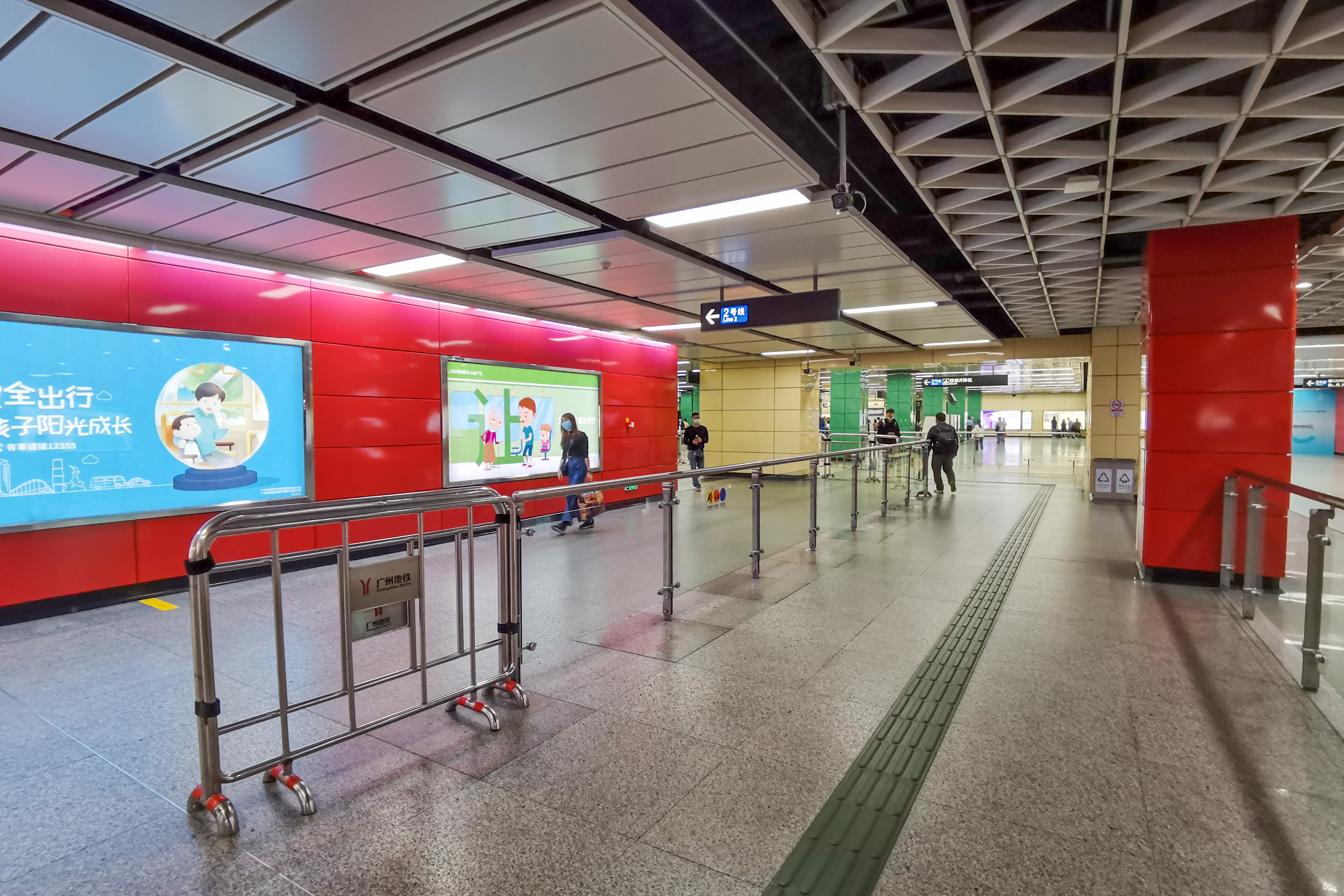
Transfer corridor
