= Guangzhou–Maoming railway =

Railway line in Guangdong, China

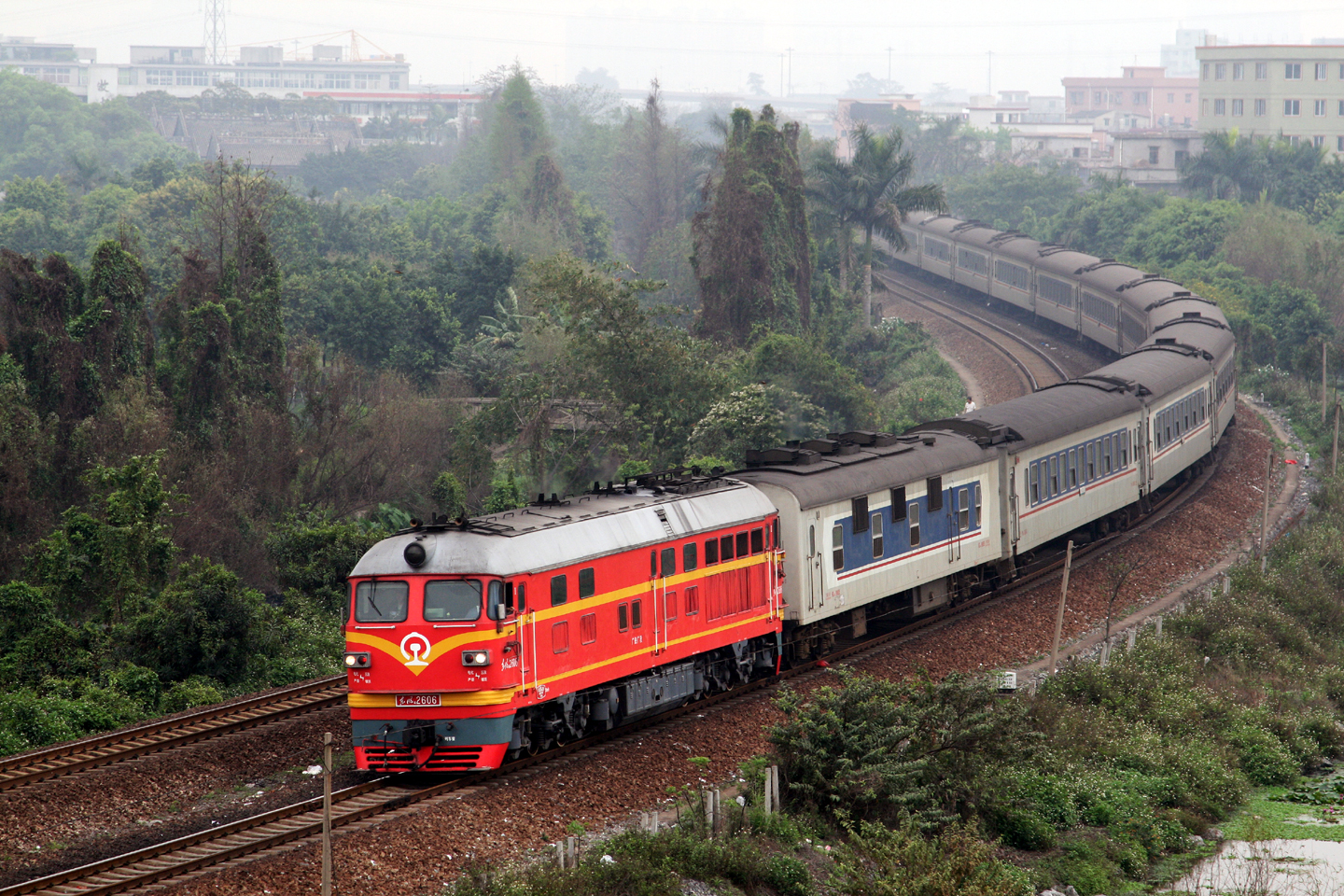
- A DF4B diesel locomotive on the Guangmao line near Guangzhou

Overview
- Status: Operational
- Termini: Guangzhou; Maomingxi

Service
- Type: Heavy rail

History
- Opened: 1904

Technical
- Line length: 404.2 km (251 mi)
- Track gauge: 1,435 mm (4 ft 8 1/2 in) standard gauge
- Operating speed: 120 km/h (75 mph)

Guangzhou–Maoming railway
- Traditional Chinese: 廣茂鐵路
- Simplified Chinese: 广茂铁路
Transcriptions
Standard Mandarin
- Hanyu Pinyin: Guǎngmào Tiělù
Yue: Cantonese
- Jyutping: gwong2 mau6 tit3 lou6

The Guangzhou–Maoming railway or Guangmao railway (Chinese: 广茂铁路; pinyin: guǎngmào tiělù), is a railroad in Guangdong Province of China between Guangzhou, the provincial capital, and Maoming. The line has a total length of 404.2 km (251 mi) and comprises the Guangzhou–Sanshui railway (Guangsan line), built from 1902 to 1904, and the Sanshui-Maoming railway (Sanmao line), built from 1958 to 1991. Major cities and towns along route include Guangzhou, Sanshui, Zhaoqing, Xinxing County, Yangchun, and Maoming.

== History ==
The Guangmao railway was officially named in February 2004 when the Guangzhou railway (Group) Company established the Guangsan railway Joint-Stock Company Limited to operate both the Guangsan and Sanmao lines.

=== Guangzhou–Sanshui railway ===
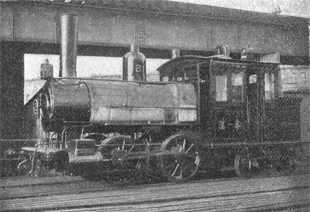
A reconditioned Forney-type tank locomotive from the Manhattan Elevated Railway on the Guangdong–Sanshui railway in 1903

The Guangzhou–Sanshui railway was built from 1902 to 1904 by an American company from 1902 to 1904 as an extension of the Guangdong–Hankou railway, west from Guangzhou through Foshan to Sanshui.

=== Sanshui–Maoming railway ===
The Sanshui–Maoming railway, which forms the main railway of western Guangdong, was built in sections from 1958 to 1991. The Sanshui-Yunfu section was completed in 1983. The entire line entered operations on 3 May 1991.

=== Yangchun–Yangdong branch line ===
In December 2001, the Yangchun–Yangjianggang railway, a branch line off of the Sanmao line from Yangchun to the port of Dayangjiang, was completed. The Yangyang railway as the line is also known, is 63.21 km (39 mi) in length.

== Rail connections ==
- Guangzhou: Beijing–Guangzhou railway, Guangzhou–Shenzhen railway, Guangzhou–Meizhou–Shantou railway
- Yangchun: Yangchun–Yangjianggang railway
- Maoming: Luoyang–Zhanjiang railway, Hechun–Maoming railway

== See also ==
- List of railways in China
