= History of rail transport in China =

Rail transport in China began in the late nineteenth century during the Qing dynasty. Since then, the Chinese rail network has become one of the largest in the world.

== Qing dynasty ==
The first railways in China were built during the Qing dynasty in the late 19th century, after extensive railway networks were already in place in Europe, North America, India and Japan. The late arrival of railways in China was due both to the lack of industrialization and skeptical attitude of the Qing government. Although diverse and prominent personages such as Lin Zexu and Taiping rebel Hong Rengan called for the building of railways in China in the mid-19th century, the conservative Qing court considered steam engines to be "clever but useless" contraptions, and resisted the railways, which would "deprive us of defensive barriers, harm our fields and interfere with our feng shui. In the 1860s, Chinese laborers helped build the Central Pacific Railroad in the United States.

=== Early efforts ===
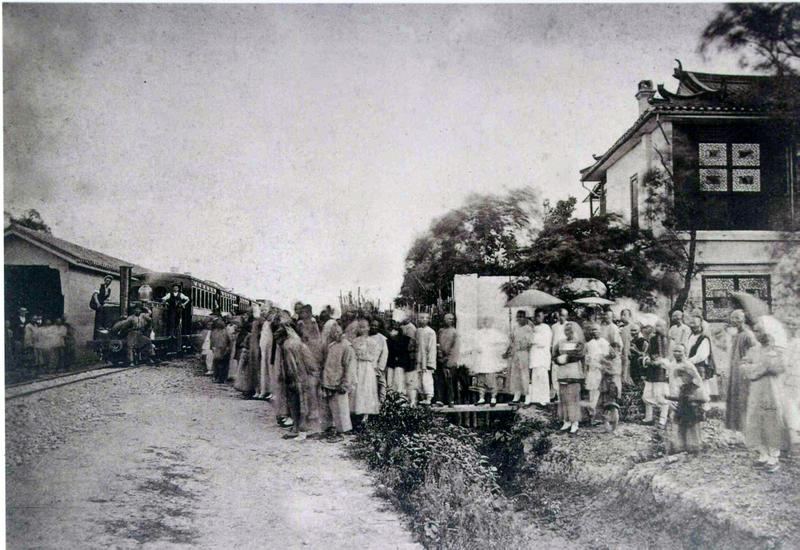
The opening of the short-lived Woosung Road, the first railway in China, between Shanghai and Wusong in 1876

In 1865, a British merchant built a 600-meter long narrow gauge railroad outside the Xuanwu Gate in Beijing to demonstrate the technology to the imperial court. The court found it "exceedingly special and strange in the utmost" and promptly had the railway dismantled.

The first railroad to operate commercially in China opened in Shanghai in July 1876. The railway, known as the Woosung Road, ran from the American Concession in the present-day Zhabei District to Woosung in the present-day Baoshan District and was built by the British trading firm, Jardine, Matheson and Co. Construction took place without approval from the Qing government, which had paid 285,000 taels of silver for the railroad and had it dismantled in October 1877. The rails and rolling stock were later shipped to Taiwan, where they idled and eventually became unusable due to rust. In late 1884, Jardine Matheson arranged a loan of 500 million taels of silver to the Chinese government in late 1884 "for the purpose of building railways".

The first railway to endure was the Kaiping Tramway and Imperial Railways of North China constructed by British engineer Claude William Kinder. Initially, a 10 kilometre (6.2 mi) line from Tangshan to Xugezhuang built in 1881 to transport coal from the coal mine in Tangshan, this line was extended to Tianjin in 1888 and Shanhaiguan and Suizhong in 1894. This railway became known as the "Guanneiwai Railway" (literally, inner and outer Shanhaiguan railway). The railway was backed by the powerful Viceroy of Zhili, Li Hongzhang, who overcame objections from conservative ministers. To secure the support of the Empress Dowager Cixi for railway construction, Li Hongzhang imported a small train set from Germany and built a 2 kilometres (1.2 mi) narrow gauge railway from her residence in Zhongnanhai to her dining hall in Beihai in 1888. The Empress, concerned that the locomotive's noise would disturb the geomancy or fengshui of the imperial city, required the train be pulled by eunuchs instead of steam engine.

The next effort was made by Taiwan Governor Liu Mingchuan. From 1887 to 1893, 107 kilometres (66 mi) of railway tracks were laid from Keelung to Taipei to Hsinchu. However, this railway was later demolished for modernization when Taiwan was under Japanese rule.

=== Rapid development during 1895–1911 ===
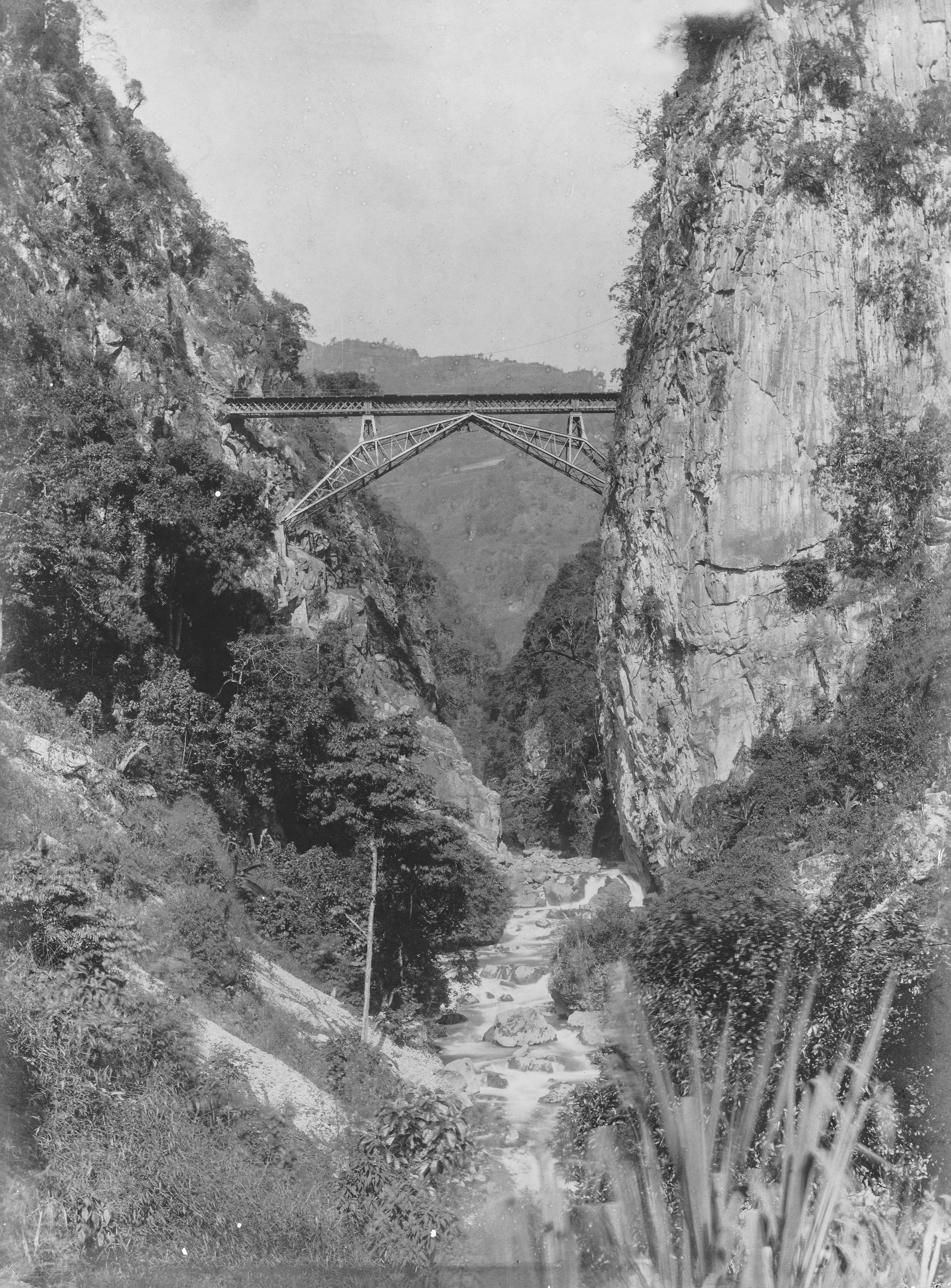
The Faux Namti Bridge on the Yunnan–Vietnam Railway was built by France in 1906.

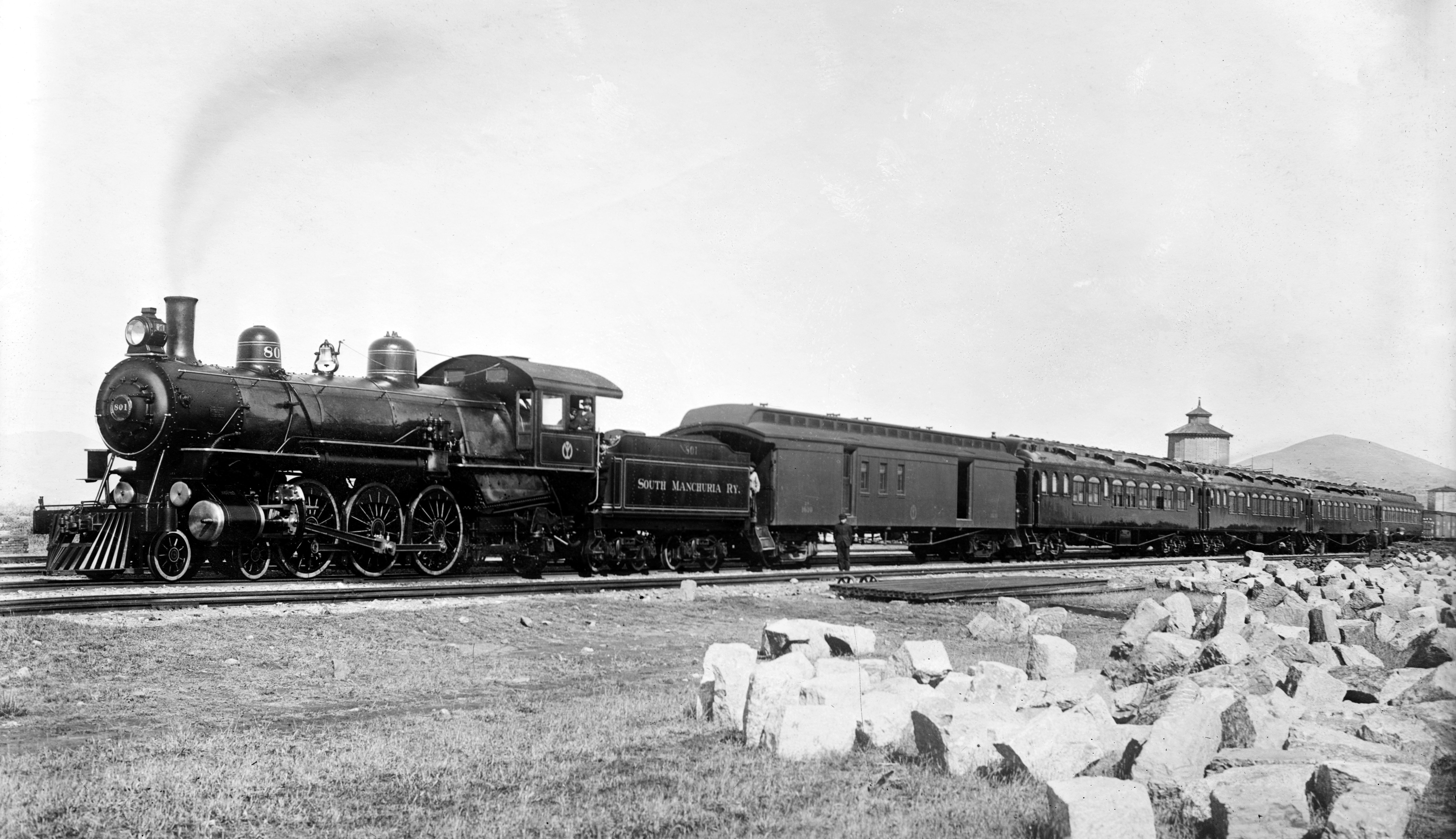
A train on South Manchuria Railway

Qing China's defeat in the First Sino-Japanese War greatly stimulated the railway development as the government both recognized the importance of modernization and was compelled by foreign powers to grant concessions to build railways along with settlement and mineral rights. The imperial powers then took to building railways in their spheres of influence. The railroads already built in 1900 had a total length of only 292 miles (470 km). Another 4,000 miles (6,400 km) were in the planning stage.

The British built the Shanghai–Nanjing Railway (1905–1908) and Kowloon–Canton Railway (completed 1911). The French built the Sino-Vietnamese Railway (1904–10), an 855 km (531 mi) 1,000 mm (3 ft 3 3/8 in) line to connect Kunming with Vietnam, then a colony of French Indochina. The Germans built the Jiaoji Railway in Shandong Province. British and German industrialists jointly built the Tianjin–Pukou Railway. The Americans built the Canton–Sam Shui Railway in Guangdong in 1902–04. Czarist Russia built the China Eastern Railway (1897–1901) as a shortcut for the Trans-Siberian Railway and the Southern Manchuria Railway to Port Arthur. To prevent domination by bigger powers, the Qing Court gave the rights to the Beijing–Hankou railway to Belgians. The Japanese initially received numerous concessions along the coast of Fujian and Guangdong, and built the Chao Chow and Swatow Railway (1904–06). After winning the Russo-Japanese War in 1904, the Japanese took over the southern section of the China Eastern Railway (from Changchun to Port Arthur) and the entire Southern Manchuria Railway.

By 1911, there were around 9,000 km (5,600 mi) of rails in China. Most of the rails used the 1,435 mm (4 ft 8 1/2 in) standard gauge.

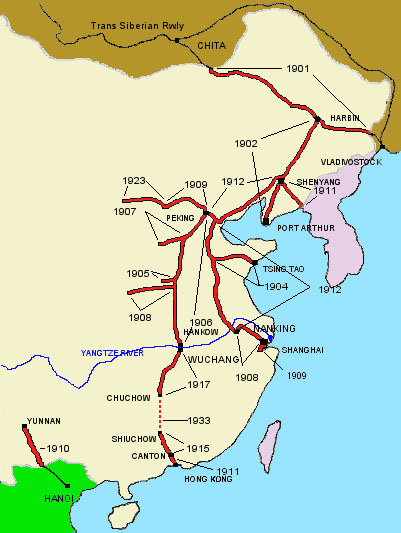
Map showing early railway expansion in China

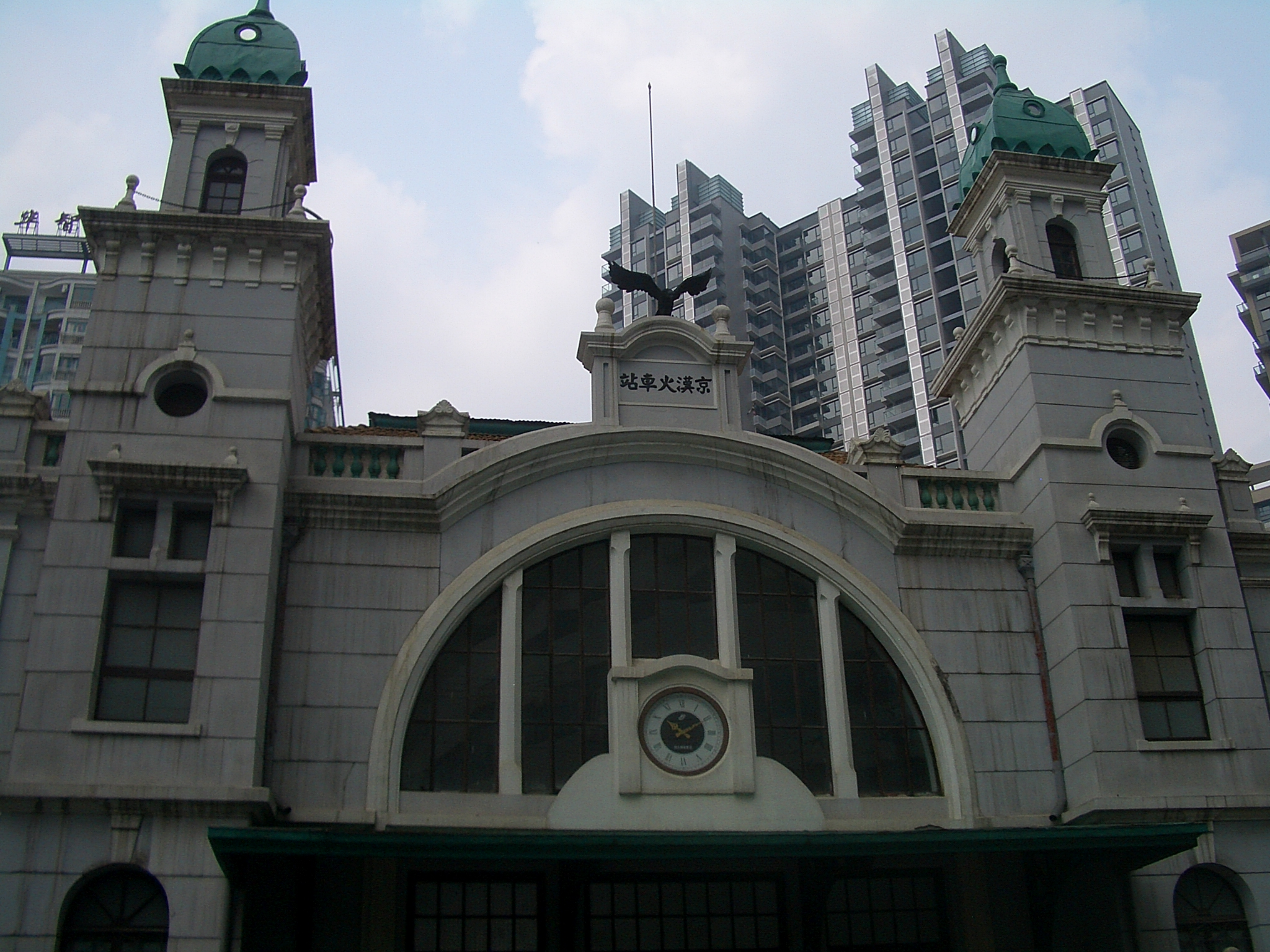
Hankou Dazhimen Station, the original southern terminal of the Jinghan Railway

The imperial capital, Beijing, was designed as the center of the Chinese railway network. Several lines radiated out from Beijing; three main lines were the Beijing–Hankou Railway, Beijing–Fengtian Railway, and Tianjin–Pukou Railway. The Jinghan railway was from Beijing to Hankou, and its construction started in 1897 and was completed in 1906. The Guangneiwai railway extended west to Beijing and east to Fengtian by 1912 and renamed as Beijing–Fengtian Railway. The Tianjin–Pukou Railway, built from 1908 to 1912. It ran from Tianjin, which was connected by the Beijing–Fengtian Railway, to Pukou, across the Yangtze River from Nanjing.

=== Railway protection movement and the Xinhai Revolution ===
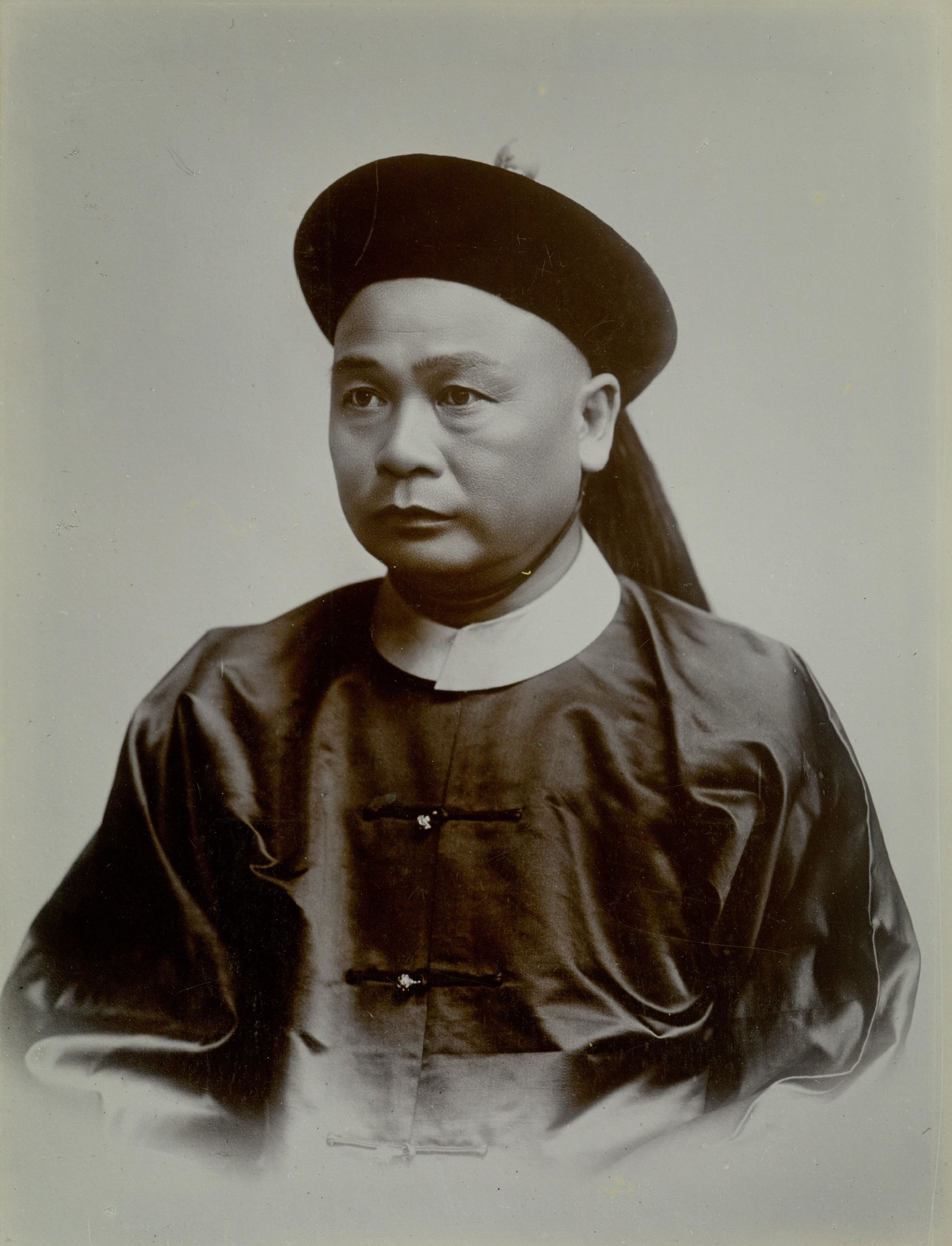
Zhan Tianyou, the "father of China's railways"

The rapid expansion of foreign railroad ownership and operation in China aroused strong public resentment and led to calls for domestic development of railways. To help local economies develop and retain earnings from railways, the Qing government in 1904 permitted local provinces to organize their own railway companies and raise funds by selling shares to the public. From 1904 to 1907, 15 provincial governments formed their own railway building companies and raised funds by selling shares to citizens and levying taxes. The Beijing–Zhangjiakou Railway built from 1905 to 1909, was the first railway to be designed and built indigenously. The chief engineer was Zhan Tianyou, who is known as the Father of China's Railways. The Shanghai–Hangzhou Railway, 189 km (117 mi) in length and completed in 1909, was financed by the provincial governments of Jiangsu and Zhejiang. The Zhengding–Taiyuan Railway, originally planned to run from Zhengding County in Hebei Province, was routed from Shijiazhuang instead and opened in 1907.

In 1911, when some of the provincial railway ventures fell into bankruptcy, the foreign powers pressed the Qing government to permit them to take over the ventures. In May 1911, the Qing government sought to nationalize these locally controlled railway companies and pledge their railway concessions to foreign banks in exchange for loans. The nationalization order provoked fierce public opposition that led to the Railway Protection Movement, which contributed to the outbreak of the Xinhai Revolution. Troops sent to Sichuan from neighboring Hubei weakened defenses in Wuhan where revolutionaries launched the Wuchang Uprising. The ensuing Xinhai Revolution toppled the Qing dynasty.

== Republic of China ==
After founding the Republic of China on January 1, 1912, Dr. Sun Yat-sen agreed to cede the provisional presidency to Yuan Shikai in exchange for the latter's assistance in securing the abdication of Qing court. Sun believed that a national railway network was key to the modernization of China. He sought and received from Yuan Shikai, the portfolio of railway development for the new republic.

From 1928 to 1937, the Republican government in Nanjing built 3,600 km (2,237 mi) of railway inside the Great Wall, some after 1934 financed through the China Development Finance Corporation. Manchuria, located beyond the wall, had 900 km (559 mi) of railways built from 1928 until 1931. On September 18, 1931, a bomb was detonated on a Japanese-owned railway track in Manchuria, which later turned out to be a false flag operation. The Japanese used this incident as a pretext for their invasion of Manchuria.

=== World War II ===
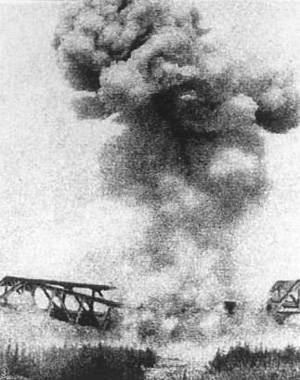
The Longhai Railway, bombed during the Second Sino-Japanese War

During the Second Sino-Japanese War of 1937–1945, the Republican government dismantled a number of railways to slow the Japanese advance and added 1,900 km (1,200 mi) of railways, mostly in the interior of China after coastal regions were occupied. Among the completed lines were the Longhai Railway (Lingbao–Tongguan and Xi'an–Baoji sections), Zhejiang–Jiangxi Railway (Hangzhou–Pingxiang section) and the Guangdong–Hankou Railway (Zhuzhou–Shaoguan section). The Shanxi warlord Yan Xishan built the narrow gauge Datong–Puzhou Railway across Shanxi Province. The Japanese occupiers, using forced labor, built 5,700 km (3,500 mi) of railway in Manchuria and Rehe Province and 900 km (559 mi) of railway in China proper.

In 1941, construction began of the Yunnan Burma Railway, an attempt to link British occupied Burma with Kunming in Yunnan province. Ultimately, however, the project was aborted.

=== 1945–1949 ===
In 1945, just after the Second Sino-Japanese War, China had 27,000 km (16,777 mi) of rail, and it was estimated about 23,000 km (14,292 mi) was usable. By 1948, the number of usable kilometers of rail was estimated at only 8,000 km (4,971 mi) due to the Chinese Civil War. The Communists actively sabotaged rail lines to disrupt the ruling Nationalists (Kuomintang), and the Nationalists scavenged lesser used railways in order to repair the most important ones.

== People's Republic of China ==
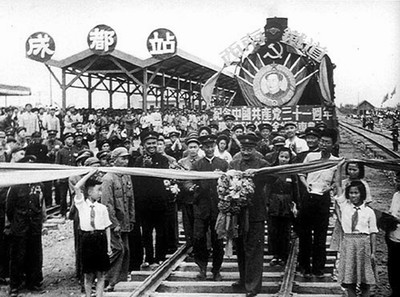
Opening ceremony of the Chengdu–Chongqing Railway, the first railway built in China after 1949

In 1951, after extensive investment in reconstruction, the Communists, who established the People's Republic of China (PRC) in October 1949, had restored the usable network to about 22,000 km (13,670 mi). Most of the early reconstruction (about 11,000 km (6,835 mi)) was in Manchuria because Soviet and Japanese occupation there reduced the amount of sabotage between the fighting parties, allowing for quick repairs.

On October 14, 1949, the cross-border service on the Kowloon–Canton Railway was suspended as a result of the communist revolution, and it was not resumed until April 4, 1979.

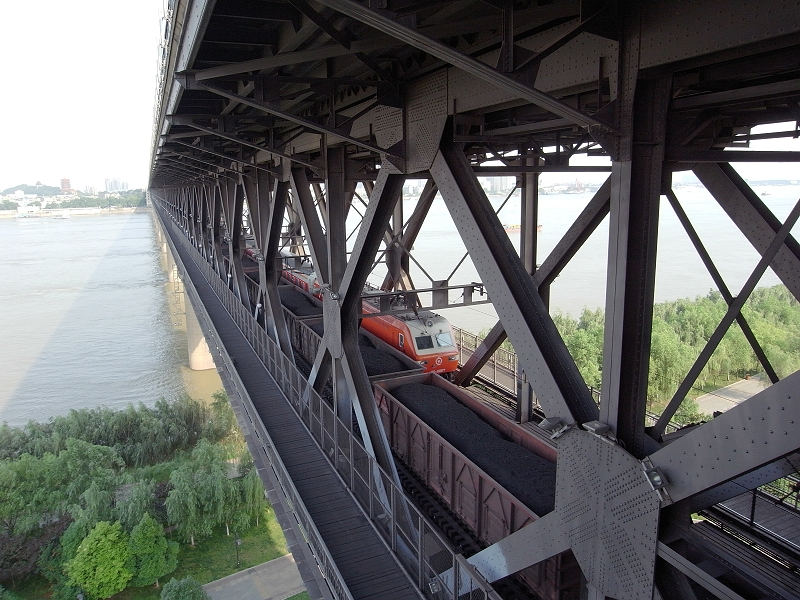
A train on Wuhan Yangtze River Bridge, the first fixed railway link across the river

In fact, when the PRC was established in 1949, China had constructed 27,380 km (17,013 mi) of railway, but only 24,090 km (14,969 mi) was kept, including 10,309 km (6,406 mi) in the northeastern part of China, and 919 km (571 mi) in Taiwan.

No Chinese enterprises had designed or built a locomotive until after the founding of the PRC. Because of the emphasis on national self-reliance in Mao era China, the locomotive industry relied primarily on domestically developed technologies. Because of limitations in coal, China developed and mass-produced diesel locomotives.

=== Railway construction in the 1950s ===
The end to decades of warfare in China allowed railway construction to proceed on a large scale. In the 1950s, the government initiated numerous railway building projects to fill in missing links in the country's rail network. The new government undertook a vigorous railway building campaign. From 1952, when the first railway of the People's Republic, the Chengdu–Chongqing Railway entered operation, to the end of the First Five Year Plan in 1957, 6,100 kilometres (3,790 miles) of railroads were built, accounting for 18% of the national total. The lines completed during this period include the final sections of the Longhai and Xianggui Railways, the Litang–Zhanjiang, Yingtan–Xiamen, Lancun–Yantai and Xiaoshan–Ningbo Railways. These lines, along with the Baoji–Chengdu Railway (completed in 1958) and the 1,900 km (1,181 mi) Lanzhou–Xinjiang Railway to Urumqi (completed in 1962), extended the national rail network to the Northwest and Southwest, and added connections between the coast and interior. In 1957, passenger trains averaged 34.8 km/h and freight trains averaged 25.2 km/h.

Between 1952 and 1957, China built 605 locomotives which drew on designs left by the Japanese-operated South Manchuria Railway.

=== The Great Leap Forward ===
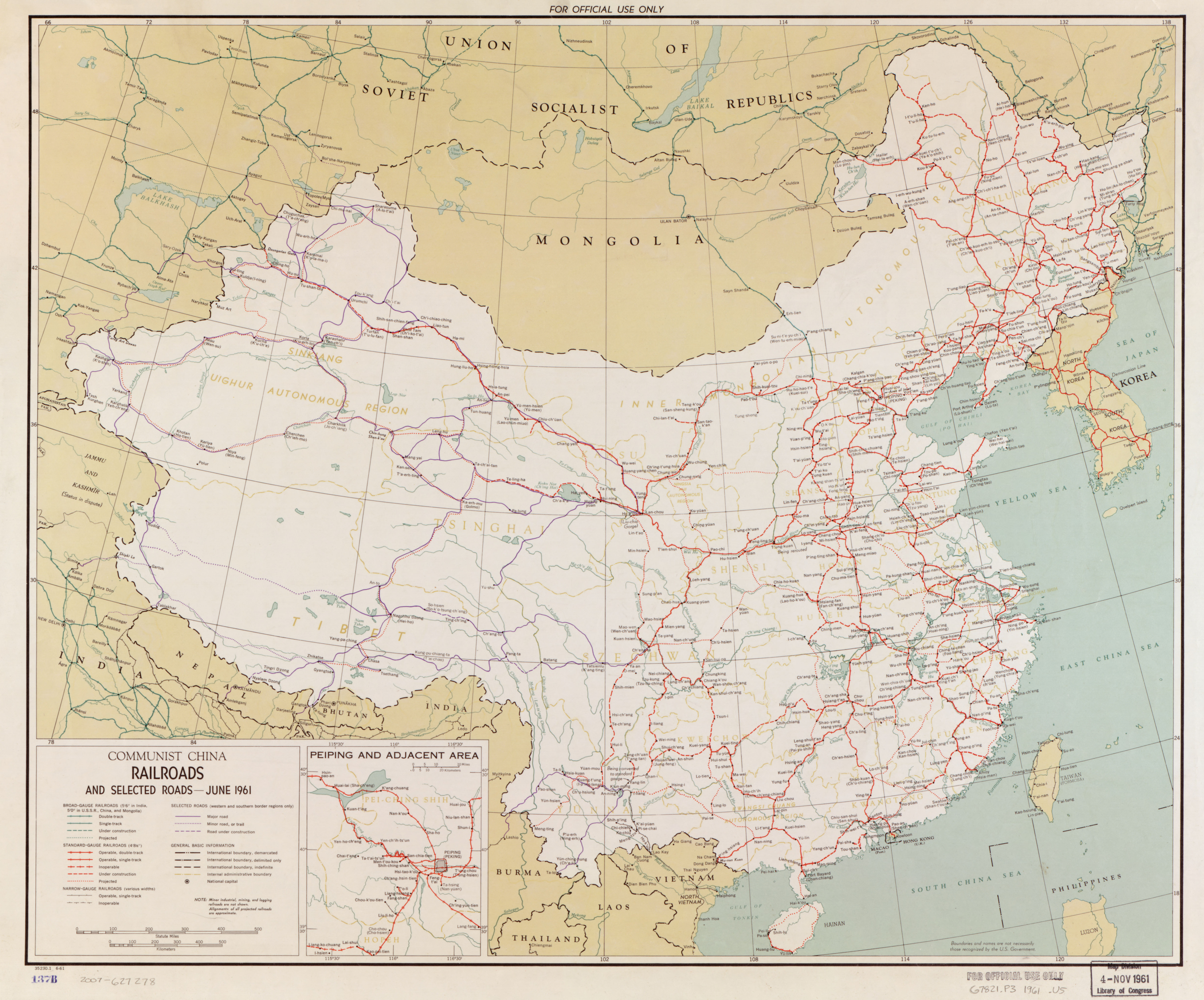
Map of China's railway network in 1961

The launch of the Great Leap Forward in 1958 was intended to rapidly expand railway transport, but produced counterproductive results. The shipment of freight, which was not quite 300 million tons in 1957, was targeted to reach 900 million tons by 1959 and 3 billion tons by 1972. The length of newly planned railways rose from 20,000 to 70,000 km (12,427 to 43,496 mi), and 120,000 km (74,565 mi) over the next 15 years. To reach these targets, the railroads were pushed beyond their capacity.

Without experimentation, freight trains on all major lines increased carrying load from 2,700 tons to 3,600 tons without adding power to locomotives. This caused trains to backslide on slopes, damage to rolling stock and steam engines to dry boil. On time rates fell precipitously. The railways did set new records, 1.4 billion passenger rides and 1.5 billion tons of freight delivered in the three years between 1958 and 1960, some 200 million passengers and 0.5 billion tons more than the five years from 1953 to 1958, but the freight load fell to 345 million tons in 1962. The economic dislocation caused by the Great Leap Forward slowed down railway construction. Numerous lines such as the Dazhou-Chengdu Railway were delayed for decades as a result.

Rail operations were revamped in 1961 and performance improved. In 1965, freight carried reached 480 million tons and the system set a new record for net income. The Sino-Soviet split prompted the leadership to shift railway building toward the "Third Line", in the mountainous regions of the interior, away from the east coast and Soviet border.

=== Cultural Revolution ===
The launch of the Cultural Revolution in 1966 brought political turmoil to the country and disruptions to railway operations. In the fall of 1966, by Chairman Mao's edict, the Red Guards from around the country could travel on trains for free. To prevent political factional fighting to spread into the railways, the national railways were assigned to the command of the military in the summer of 1967. Railway management and operations, nevertheless, slipped rapidly. Accident rates rose 25% from 1966 to 1967, and another 20% from 1967 to 1968. Premier Zhou Enlai and other moderate leaders pushed back against leftist-radical management of the railway and operations began to improve in 1969. In 1973, the system shipped 800 million tons, a new record. In 1974, however, the Gang of Four with the Criticize Lin, Criticize Confucius Campaign, reasserted the leftist line and railway performance plummted again. From the summer of 1974 to early 1975, railway hubs in Xuzhou, Changsha, Guiyang, and Baotou experienced freight bottlenecks. In April 1975, Deng Xiaoping took control of the leadership and directed the railways to focus on productivity and safety. In April 1975, the railways' coal carrying targets were met for the first time in nearly five years. In early 1976, after Deng Xiaoping was removed from power and the Gang of Four reasserted control, railway performance declined again. Compared to 1975, freight fell by 46.3 million tons year-on-year, accidents rose by 17% and tax revenues paid to the state fell by 740 million.

Despite the turmoil of the Cultural Revolution and slowdown in rail construction at home, the Chinese Railway Ministry and the Rail Corps managed to build a 1,860 km (1,156 mi) railway across Tanzania and Zambia. The TAZARA Railway was by far the largest foreign aid project undertaken by China in Africa. As many as 56,000 Chinese engineers and workers were sent overseas from 1968 to 1975.

After the Cultural Revolution ended and the reform and opening up were launched in 1978, the railways were reorganized and rededicated to improving safety, performance, technology and profitability. These principles have guided the railway's operations in the decades since.

In 1998, passenger trains averaged 54.5 km/h and freight trains averaged 31.8 km/h.

=== Slowdown in the 1980s ===
After China initiated market-oriented economic reforms in 1978, railway building slowed as state funds were directed toward higher return investments. It was not until the 1990s, after more than a decade of economic growth, that the state committed the funds to renew large-scale railway building.

=== Railway building boom since 1990 ===
In 1990, the Lanxin Railway was extended by the Northern Xinjiang Railway to the Kazakh border. In 1999, the Southern Xinjiang Railway brought railway service to Kashgar in the far west.

The railway to Tibet however, was more difficult to build due to the high altitude and terrain. Rail lines were first extended to Xining in Qinghai, and by 1984 another section between Xining and Golmud was completed. It was not until 2006 that the whole of the Qingzang railway was finished, linking Lhasa with rest of China. Since then, every province-level entity in the People's Republic of China has a railway network.

=== End of the steam age ===
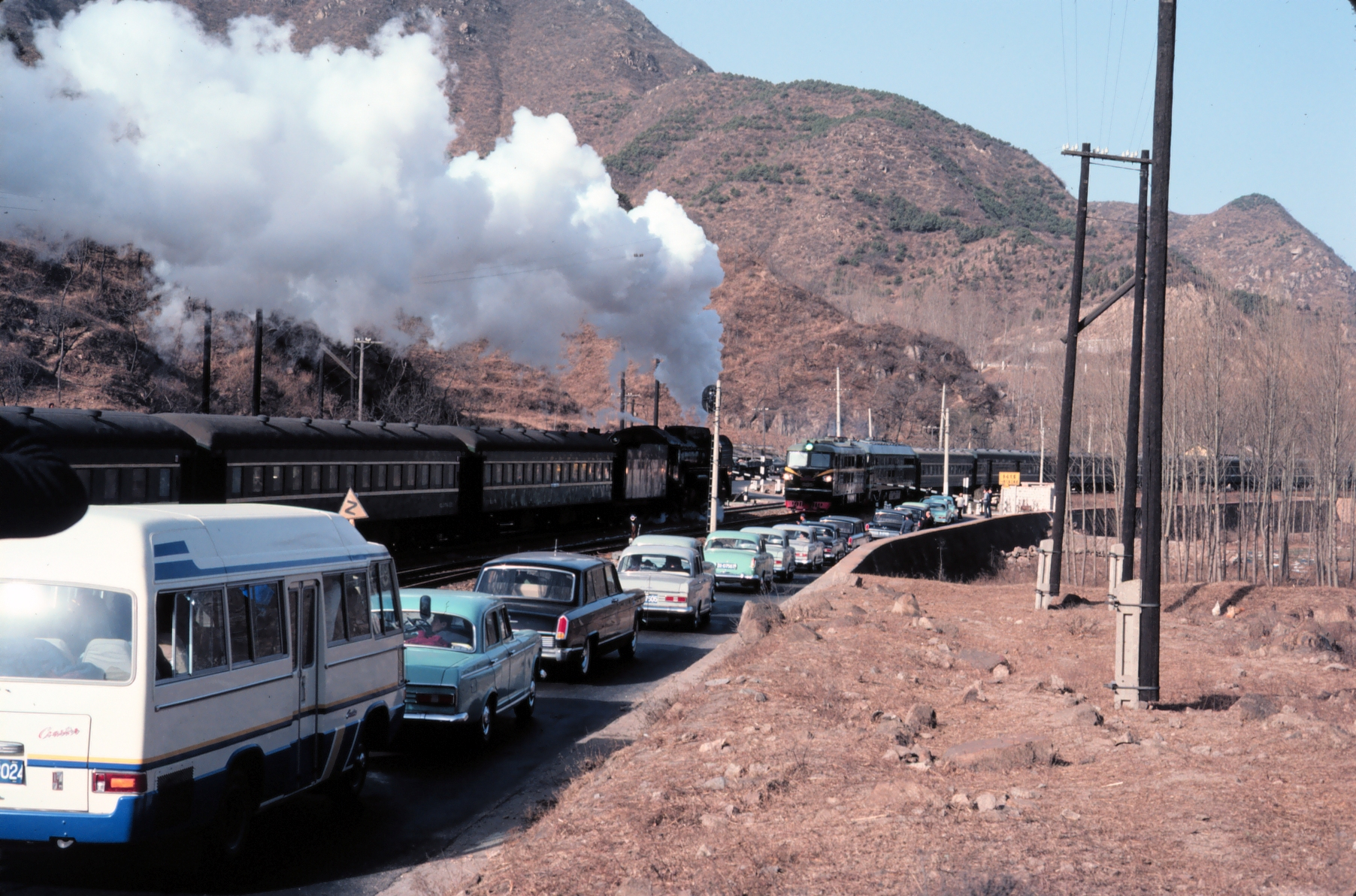
A steam locomotive and a diesel locomotive near the Badaling Great Wall in Beijing in 1979

Before the 1980s, due to the low labor cost, ease of manufacture, and cheap coal price, steam locomotives dominated the Chinese railways. However, during the 1980s and 90s, diesel and electric locomotives gradually replaced steam engines on the main lines. On some provincial rails, however, steam locomotives were not retired until the 21st century.

Nevertheless, steam locomotives continued to be used on some of China's industrial railways for nearly 20 more years. The last reported operation was Class JS 2-8-2 8089 at Xinjiang Province's Sandaoling Coal Mine on January 15, 2024.

=== High speed rails ===
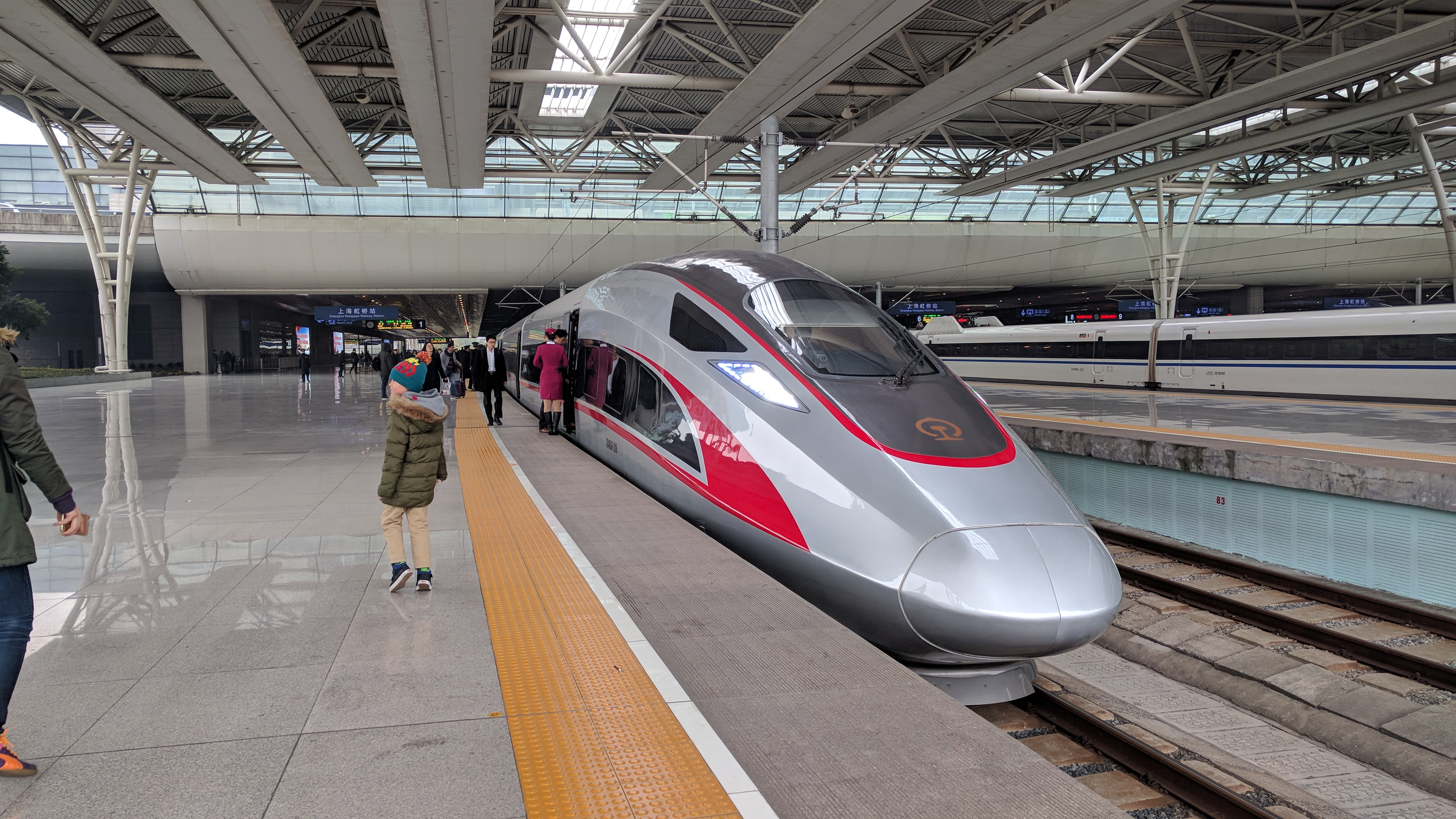
A high-speed rail train in Shanghai

In 1978, during Deng Xiaoping's visit to Japan, he experienced the Shinkansen, the world's first high-speed rail. This sparked an interest in high-speed rail systems in mainland China. As part of an infrastructure upgrade, China opened its first high-speed rail lines in 2007, utilizing trains sourced from Canada, France, Germany, and Japan. As of 2021, China possesses the world's largest high-speed rail network, with a total operating length of 40,000 kilometers.

=== Network length table ===
Rail track length

Year	km	±% p.a.
1948	12,768	—
1949	21,800	+70.74%
1950	22,200	+1.83%
1951	22,300	+0.45%
1952	22,900	+2.69%
1953	23,800	+3.93%
1954	24,500	+2.94%
1955	25,600	+4.49%
1956	26,500	+3.52%
1957	26,700	+0.75%
1958	30,200	+13.11%
1959	32,300	+6.95%
1960	33,900	+4.95%
1961	34,500	+1.77%
1962	34,600	+0.29%
1963	35,000	+1.16%

Year	km	±% p.a.
1964	35,300	+0.86%
1965	36,400	+3.12%
1966	37,800	+3.85%
1967	38,600	+2.12%
1968	38,800	+0.52%
1969	39,300	+1.29%
1970	41,000	+4.33%
1979	53,000	+2.89%
1980	53,300	+0.57%
1981	53,900	+1.13%
1982	52,900	−1.86%
1983	54,100	+2.27%
1984	54,500	+0.74%
1985	55,000	+0.92%
1986	55,700	+1.27%
1987	55,800	+0.18%

Year	km	±% p.a.
1988	56,100	+0.54%
1989	56,900	+1.43%
1990	57,800	+1.58%
1991	57,800	+0.00%
1992	58,100	+0.52%
1993	58,600	+0.86%
1994	59,000	+0.68%
1995	62,400	+5.76%
1996	64,900	+4.01%
1997	66,000	+1.69%
1998	66,400	+0.61%
1999	67,394	+1.50%
2000	68,700	+1.94%
2001	70,100	+2.04%
2002	71,900	+2.57%
2003	73,000	+1.53%

Year	km	±% p.a.
2004	74,400	+1.92%
2005	75,409	+1.36%
2006	77,109	+2.25%
2007	77,966	+1.11%
2008	79,687	+2.21%
2009	85,818	+7.69%
2010	90,504	+5.46%
2012	97,600	+3.85%
2013	103,144	+5.68%
2014	111,800	+8.39%
2015	120,970	+8.20%
2016	124,000	+2.50%
2017	127,000	+2.42%
2018	131,000	+3.15%

Source: 历史统计:金砖国家历年铁路营业里程比较(1838～2010) • Search for 铁路营业里程 at National Bureau of Statistics of China/Overview • Facts and figures about China's railway development (18 January 2016)^{[a]} • 2018 Rail Statistics Public Report

== See also ==
- Transport in China
- Rail transport in the People's Republic of China
- Kaiping Tramway
- History of rail transport

== Notes ==
- a. There is a significant discrepancy in the total length of China's railways reported by China Statistical Yearbook (120,970 km (75,170 mi) at year end 2015) and the CIA Factbook (191,270 km (118,850 mi) in 2014). The CIA Factbook figure is based on "the total length of the railway network and of its component parts." The Statistical Yearbook figure includes "the total length of the trunk line for passenger and freight transportation in full operation or temporary operation" and measures the actual route distance between the midpoints of railway stations. Any double-tracked route or route with a return track of shorter distance is counted using the length of the original route. The length of any return tracks, other tracks within stations, maintenance and service tracks (such as those used to turn trains around), tracks of fork lines, special purpose lines and non-revenue connecting lines are excluded. The Statistical Yearbook provides cross-year and cross-regional breakdowns of railway length and its figures are presented in China railway articles.
