= Guangzhou–Hankou railway =

Railway line in China

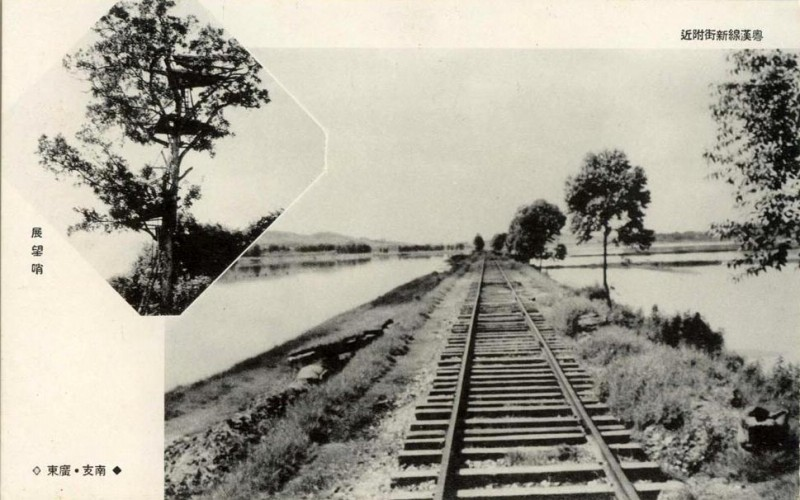
- The completed line in 1939

Yuehan railway
- Traditional Chinese: 粵漢鐵路
- Simplified Chinese: 粤汉铁路
Transcriptions
Standard Mandarin
- Hanyu Pinyin: Yuè–Hàn Tiělù
Yue: Cantonese
- Yale Romanization: YuthHon TitLouh
- Jyutping: Jyut6Hon3 Tit3Lou6

The Guangzhou–Hankou or Yuehan railway is a former railroad in China which once connected Guangzhou on the Pearl River Delta in the south with Wuchang on the Yangtze River in the north. At the Yangtze, the railway carriages were ferried to Hankou, which then connected to the Beijing–Hankou railway. It was constructed from 1900 to 1936 and, from their former romanizations, was known at the time as the Canton–Hankow railway.

The completion of the Wuhan Yangtze River Bridge in 1957 finally linked the two lines into a single contiguous railway and its former track now forms the southern leg of the Beijing–Guangzhou railway.

== History ==
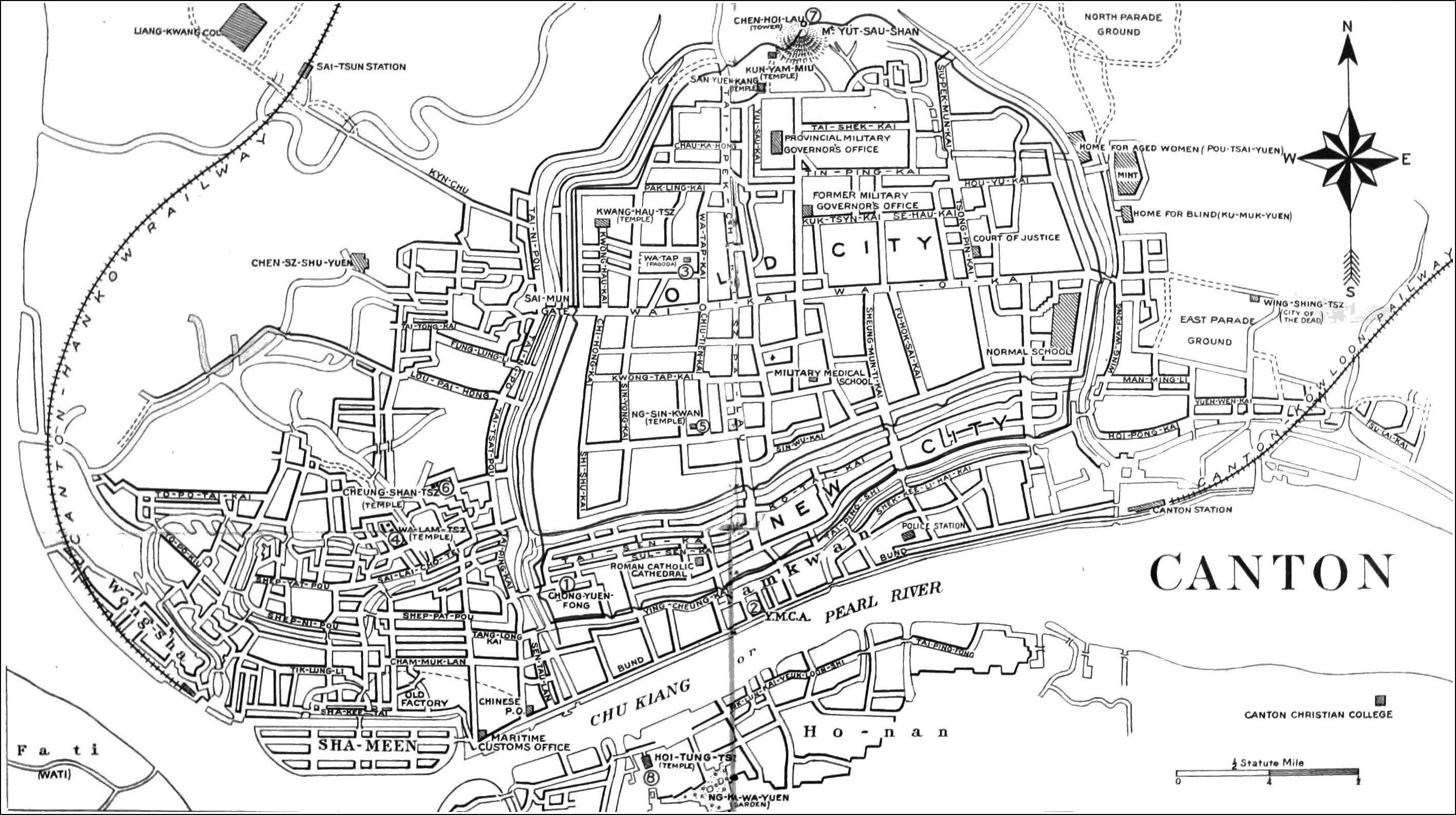
A map of Guangzhou ("Canton") in 1920, showing the route of the "Canton–Hankow railway" from the western suburbs north along the Pearl River.

In 1897, a concession for the Beijing–Hankou railway was awarded to a Belgian consortium backed by French financing. The British were then the dominant foreign power in China, and the Belgian concession would keep the important route out of British hands. To prevent the French from controlling the entire route between Beijing and Guangzhou, the Chinese government actively sought American involvement in the Guangzhou–Hankou railway. A concession for the southern railway was awarded to the American China Development Company in 1898.

Construction on the project began in 1900, with the southern terminus on the east bank of the Pearl River. The 49-kilometer (30 mi) branch line to Sanshui ("Samshui") via Foshan ("Fatshan") was constructed westward from the west bank of the Pearl from 1902 to 1904.

A diplomatic crisis erupted when it was discovered that a Belgian consortium had purchased a controlling interest in the American China Development Company. This subverted the original intention of awarding different railway lines to different foreign powers. The American financier J. P. Morgan bought a large stake in the company in November 1904, but the concession was cancelled on November 19, 1904. Morgan demanded US$18 million in compensation but settled for US$6.75 million, representing treble damages for the US$1 million already spent on the construction of the railway, plus US$3.75 million to redeem the concession.

The railway was completed in 1936.

== See also ==
- Theodone C. Hu
- Guangzhou–Sanshui railway
- Rail transport & History of rail transport in China
- List of railways in China
