= September 11 Great Armed Clan Feud of Matian =

1993 feud in China

- Date: September 11, 1993
- Location: Matian Town, Chenzhou, Hunan, China; 26°5′40.29″N 112°53′49.62″E
- Caused by: Clan conflicts between two villages
- Methods: Shooting, shelling, trench-digging, raiding
- Result: Dispersed by the People's Armed Police

Parties
Matian Village	Jinggang Village

Number
Thousands	Thousands

Casualties and losses
1	7

Casualties
- Injuries: Hundreds

The September 11 Great Armed Clan Feud of Matian（Chinese: 马田“9.11”宗派大械斗）was a 1993 armed feud between local villagers from 6 townships in Matian, Chenzhou, Hunan, China. It began on September 11, 8:30 Beijing time, and lasted for 34 hours with up to 5,000 villagers taking part in total. Thousands of peasants fought with dynamite, homemade guns, cannons and other weapons. More than 1,000 police were dispatched to dispense of the crowd.

The tension between the rival Matian and Jinggang villages can be traced back to 1928, when a warlord from Matian killed 27 peasants from Jinggang in the name of eliminating communists. Chenzhou, Hunan was also a hotspot for clan feuds. Incomplete statics between 1987 and 1988 show there were 1,505 big clan feuds in Chengzhou that caused 83 deaths, 805 injures and 113 buildings burnt.

On September 8th, a child died from a brawl between Jinggang and Matian villagers. The two villages soon began to prepare for battle, build fortifications and bunkers, digging trenches, controlling hilltops and inviting friendly clans. The battle broke out in the morning of September 11th. Artillery fire covered an area of 2 square kilometers. Several multiple floor buildings and stores were bombed. Both sides raided nearby coal mines for explosives and raw material for homemade guns and cannons.

The Beijing–Guangzhou railway, a major national artery, was stopped for 5 hours. 8 died and dozens more seriously injured. Police evacuated the surrounded Jinggang villagers with tear gas breaking the crowd. After the fight, police arrested 12 major conspirers, confiscated dozens of homemade cannons and guns, 233 kilograms of dynamite, 2590 detonators, 255 grenades, and numerous melee weapons and war materials.

In 2009 nearly 200 peasants from the two villages were ready for another battle but the government successfully mediated the conflict.
