= Chenzhou railway station =

Railway station in Chenzhou, Hunan

Chenzhou 郴州
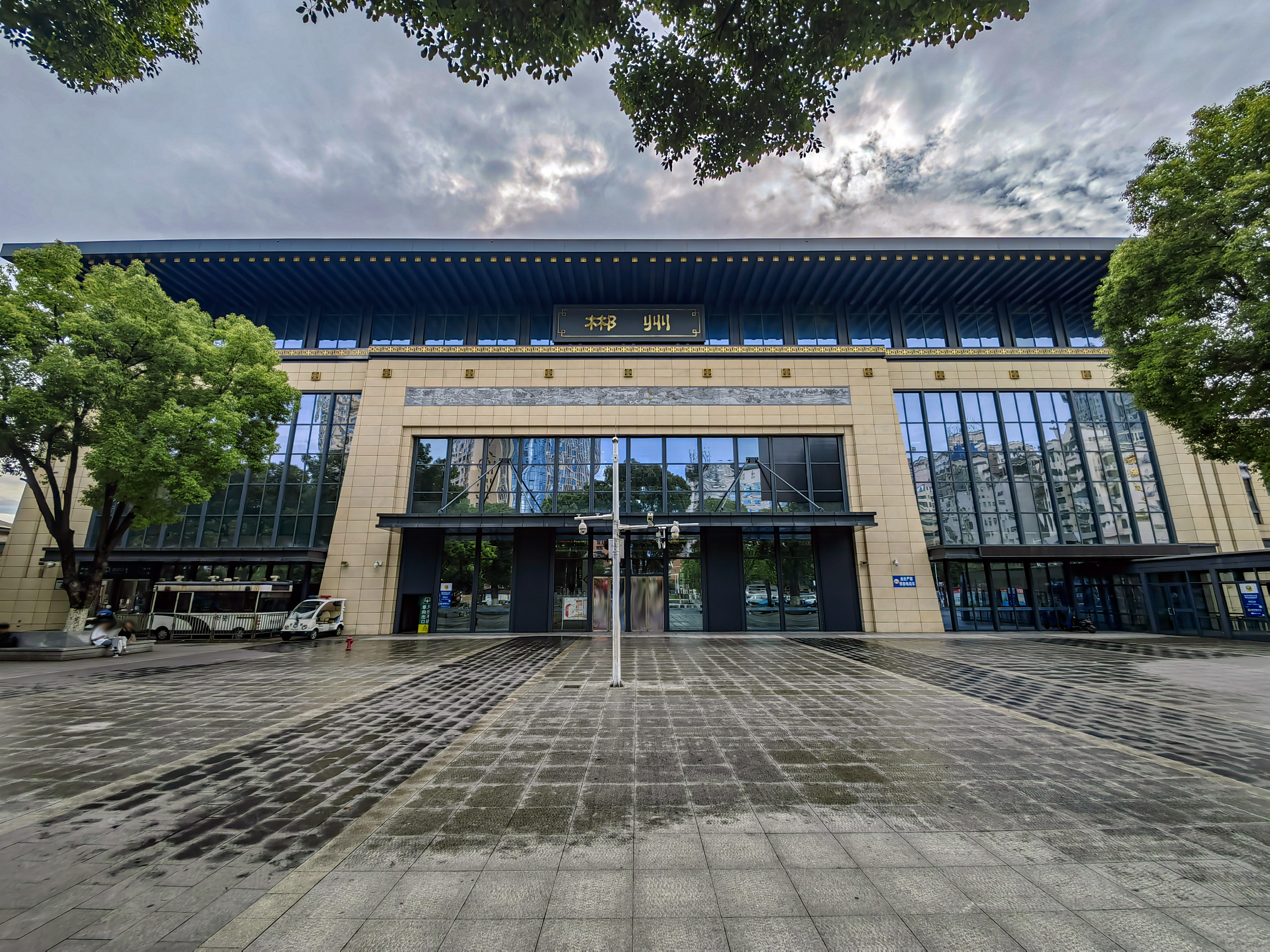

General information
- Location: Beihu District, Chenzhou, Hunan; China
- Coordinates: 25°48′40″N 113°01′40″E
- Line: Beijing–Guangzhou railway

History
- Opened: 1936
Location

Chenzhou railway station (Chinese: 郴州站) is a railway station in Beihu District, Chenzhou, Hunan, China. It is an intermediate stop on the Beijing–Guangzhou railway.

== History ==
The station opened in 1936. In 1956, the station was renamed Chenzhou Station and came under the management of the Guangzhou Railway Bureau. In 1958, the station's second platform was demolished and rebuilt into two arrival and departure tracks; in 1970, five additional freight tracks were added. All passenger services were suspended on 10 April 2021 to allow the station to be rebuilt.

In 2012, the station began operating commuter trains 8629/8630 to Baishidu, which continued until the service was discontinued in 2022.

In 2014, the station's forecourt underwent an upgrade and renovation project, which was completed in November of the same year.

== See also ==
- Chenzhou train collision
- Chenzhou West railway station

| Preceding station | China Railway | Following station |
|---|---|---|
| Leiyang towards Beijing or Beijing West | Beijing–Guangzhou railway | Pingshi towards Guangzhou |
