= Wuhan Railway Hub =

Transport hub in Wuhan, China

Wuhan Railway Hub (Chinese: 武汉铁路枢纽) is one of the four most important railway hubs in the People's Republic of China. The hub centers on Wuhan City, ranges from Wuhan North Railway Station in the north to the Wulongquan Railway Station in the south. Beijing–Guangzhou Railway, Beijing–Guangzhou–Shenzhen–Hong Kong High-Speed Railway and Beijing–Kowloon railway run through the Wuhan metropolitan area in the north–south direction. Wuhan-Jiujiang Railway, Hankou-Danjiangkou Railway and Shanghai–Wuhan–Chengdu High-Speed Railway runs through the area in the east–west direction. The 2013 ridership of Wuhan Railway Hub has reached 120 million trips, making it the hub with the largest passenger volume, surpassing Beijing and Guangzhou.

Wuhan suspended all public transportation from 10am on 23 January 2020 onwards, including all bus, metro, ferry lines, all outbound trains and flights due to the COVID-19 pandemic. The Wuhan Railway Hub was then suspended.

== Major railway stations ==
Wuhan's three main passenger stations:

- Wuhan Railway Station - primarily high-speed trains, especially on the Beijing–Guangzhou High-Speed Railway
- Hankou Railway Station - most of the high-speed trains on the Shanghai–Wuhan–Chengdu High-Speed Railway, and conventional trains
- Wuchang Railway Station - conventional trains and some high-speed trains

Freight

- Wuhan North Railway Station

== See also ==
- Category:Railway stations in Wuhan
