= Wuhan North railway station =

Railway station in Wuhan, China

Coordinates: 30°47′17″N 114°18′27″E

Wuhan North railway station (Chinese: 武汉北站; pinyin: Wǔhàn běi zhàn) is the main freight railway station and marshalling yard of the Wuhan railway hub and metropolitan area, in China's Hubei Province. The facility is located on the Beijing–Guangzhou railway, 20 kilometres (12 mi) north of Wuhan railway station and 23 kilometres (14 mi) from Hankou railway station. Administratively, it is in Hengdian Subdistrict (横店街道) of Wuhan's Huangpi District.

== Overview ==
One of the largest facilities of its kind in the nation, Wuhan North railway station has 112 tracks and over 650 switches. It occupies 4.47 km^{2} (1.73 sq mi) of land.

There are several other rail freight facilities in Wuhan, including Wuchang South and Wuchang West stations.

Wuhan North was opened on May 18, 2009, replacing the Jiang'an West marshalling yard, which has since been converted into a facility for servicing China Railway High-speed trainsets. In 2022, the station was expanded.

== Passenger service ==
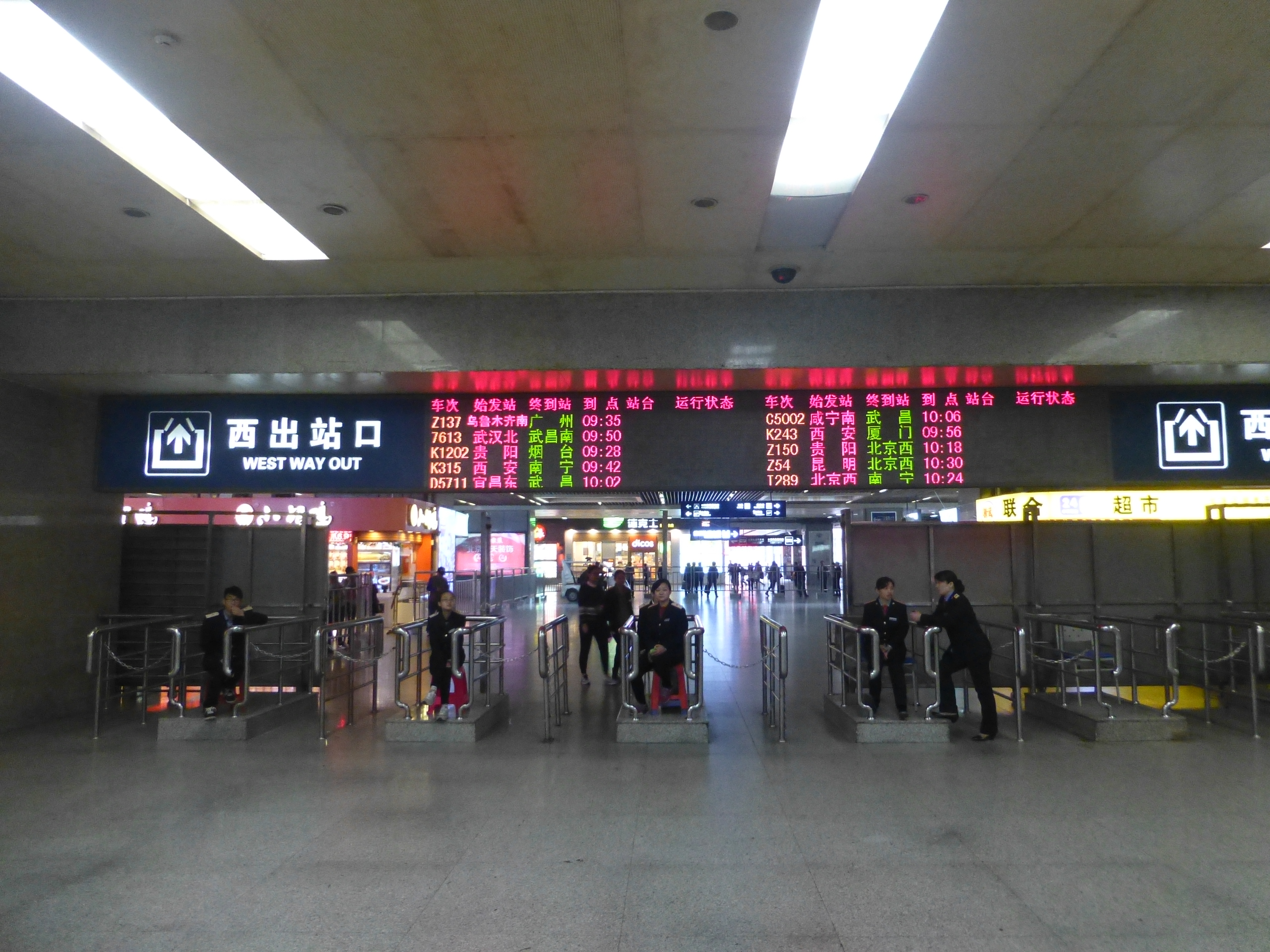
A Wuhan North - Wuchang South train listed on the arrival board at Wuchang railway station

Primarily a freight facility, Wuhan North is not listed in normal passenger train schedule systems (such as http://www.12306.cn/ ). However, a special commuter train, primarily for the needs of workers employed at and around Wuhan North station, runs between Wuhan North and Wuchang South station (a freight station in Wuchang District, south of Wuchang railway station), with stops at both Hankou and Wuchang stations.
