= Yueyang railway station =

Railway station in Yueyang, Hunan, China

Yueyang 岳阳
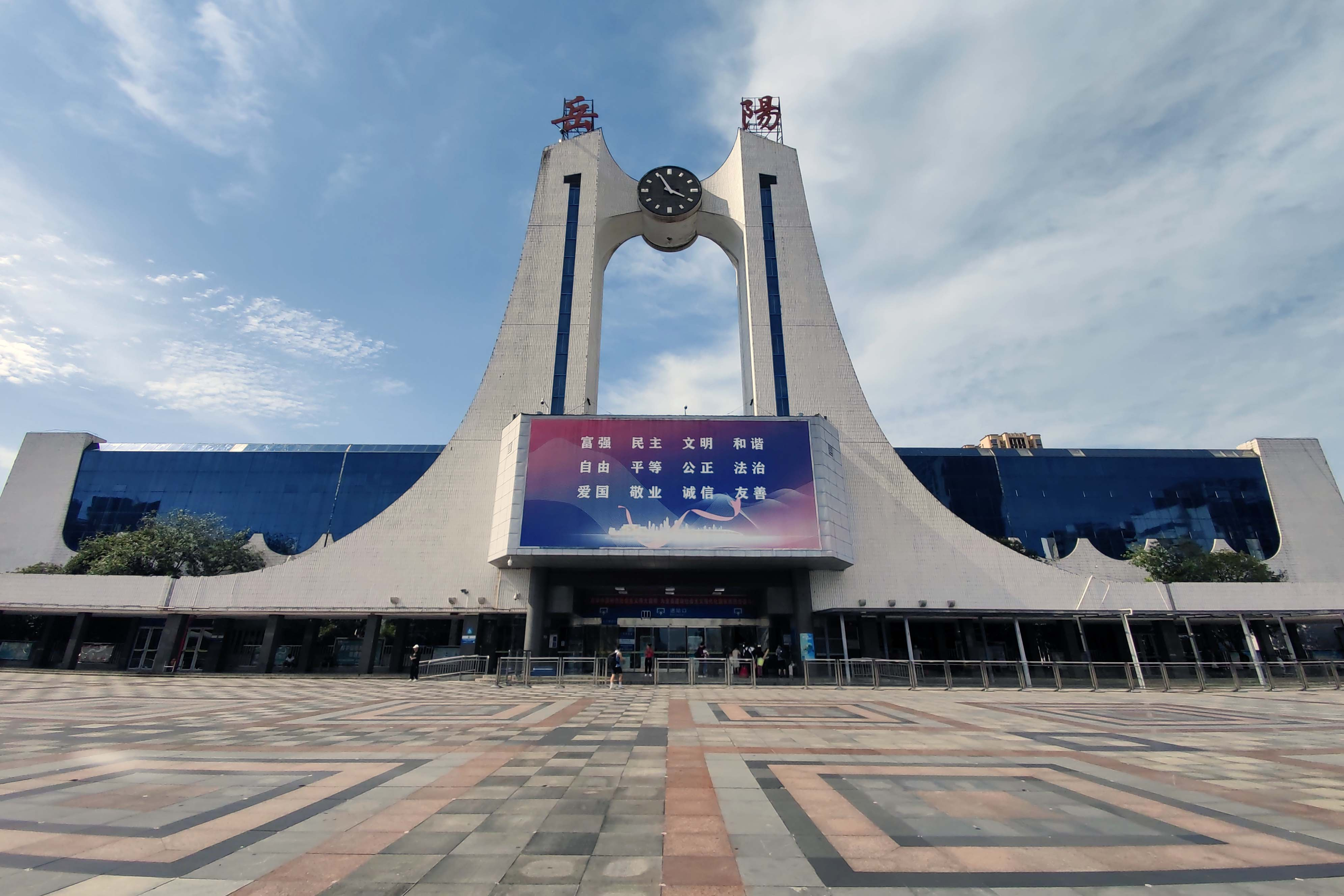

General information
- Location: Yueyang, Hunan; China
- Coordinates: 29.379221°N 113.114079°E
- Operator: CR Guangzhou
- Line: Beijing–Guangzhou railway
- Platforms: 2

Other information
- Station code: 22799 (TMIS code); YYQ (telegraph code); YYA (Pinyin code)
- Classification: Class 1 station (一等站)

History
- Opened: 8 October 1994
Location

Yueyang railway station (Chinese: 岳阳站) is a railway station in Yueyang, Hunan, China. It is an intermediate stop on the Beijing–Guangzhou railway.

== History ==
The old Yueyang railway station was opened in 1914. The construction of the new station started in June 1991.

The new Yueyang railway station was opened on 8 October 1994. The old station was eventually renamed to Yueyangnan (Yueyang South) railway station following the opening of the new station.

Preceding station	China Railway	Following station
Yueyangbei towards Beijing or Beijing West	Beijing–Guangzhou railway	Yueyangnan towards Guangzhou
