= Yangchun–Yangjianggang railway =

It's very long track

The Yangchun–Yangjianggang railway (Chinese: 阳阳铁路) is a railway line in Yangjiang, Guangdong, China.

== History ==
Construction began in September 1995. On 19 March 2002, a 46 kilometres (29 mi) long stretch between Yangchun and a temporary terminus was opened. The line was fully opened on 28 June 2004.

== Route ==
The line splits from the Guangzhou–Maoming railway at Yangchun and heads south, meeting the coast at Yangjiang Port. The line is 63.21 kilometres (39.28 mi) long.
