= Chenzhou train collision =

2009 railway accident in Chenzhou, China

Coordinates: 25°48′32″N 113°01′59″E

- Location within Hunan

Details
- Date: June 29, 2009; 02:34 CST (UTC+8)
- Location: Chenzhou railway station Chenzhou, Chenzhou, Hunan
- Country: China
- Line: Beijing–Guangzhou railway
- Operator: China Railways, Guangdong Railway Group
- Incident type: Derailment
- Cause: under investigation

Statistics
- Trains: 2
- Deaths: 3
- Injured: 60+

Chenzhou train collision
- Simplified Chinese: 郴州列车相撞事故
- Traditional Chinese: 郴州列車相撞事故
Transcriptions
Standard Mandarin
- Hanyu Pinyin: Chēnzhōu lièchē xiāngzhuàng shìgù

Alternative Chinese name
- Simplified Chinese: “6·29”京广铁路特大交通事故
- Traditional Chinese: “6·29”京廣鐵路特大交通事故
- Literal meaning: "June 29" Beijing–Guangzhou railway major transport incident
Transcriptions
Standard Mandarin
- Hanyu Pinyin: Liù'èrjiǔ Jīng-Guǎng tiělù tèdà jiāotōng shìgù

The Chenzhou train collision occurred on June 29, 2009, at Chenzhou railway station in Chenzhou, Hunan province, China, when two passenger trains collided, leaving at least three people dead and 63 injured. The crash occurred at 02:34 local time, between express trains numbered K9017 and K9063. The investigation determined that the accident was caused by a worker failing to remove a dust plug on a brake line of a newly manufactured carriage, causing the K9017 train to lose braking power on most of its carriages when the dust plug blocked the air brake hose.

== Collision ==
The collision occurred on the conventional Beijing–Guangzhou (or Jingguang) railway. Train K9017 was an express K-class passenger train departing from Changsha, Hunan, to Shenzhen, Guangdong. At around 02:34 local time, the train pulled into Chenzhou Railway Station at speeds of over 50 km/h (31 mph), colliding sideways against train K9063 from Tongren (zh), Guizhou to Shenzhen West, which had just begun its way out of the station. The initial investigation found that K9017 sped into a turning point at the station, ignoring a red light prompting it to stop, and was travelling at a speed of 55 km/h (34 mph). The speed led the train to derail. The two train engines and six carriages went off the track. One of the cars crashed into two nearby houses, destroying the structures.

According to the electronic display boards at the station, K9063 was scheduled to enter the station at 02:12 and depart at 02:22, while K9017 was scheduled to arrive at 02:38 and depart at 02:41, meaning the trains should have entered the station at least some 15 minutes apart from each other. Passengers on the K9017 revealed that the train had initially stopped for twenty minutes before arriving at Chenzhou railway station, at around 02:00. There seemed to have been no effort from K9017 in stopping the train as it entered Chenzhou station, which was a scheduled stop. In addition, no precautions were taken by the departing K9063 train. As a result, netizens questioned the validity of the claim that there was a brake failure.

The collision left thousands of passengers stranded at the station.

== Casualties ==
CCTV broadcast that two passengers stayed in intensive care in hospital. Forty-two other people were receiving treatment for minor injuries. Three passengers are confirmed dead from the accident. All were female; two of these were passengers and one was a woman in her dwelling at the time.

== Cause ==
Guangdong Railways Group, the operator of the two services, has blamed the accident on brake failure. This has not yet been confirmed by the Ministry of Railways.

== Investigation ==
An investigation was requested by Liang Jiakun, deputy director of the State Administration of Work Safety. The Ministry of Railways launched an investigation.

According to a briefing held on June 30 by the railway authority and Chengzhou city government the incident was caused by the brake failure of the K9017 train.

On 15 July 2009, the final cause of the accident was published by the Ministry of Railways. The cause was determined as being that a dust plug of a brake house of one of the carriages was not removed at the Nanjing Puzhen factory, violating manufacturing instructions. The K9017 train was pulling 18 newly manufactured train carriages, which were put in use on June 24. During the accident on June 29, the train driver on the way to Chenzhou station applied the brakes, but the dust plug caused the main brake air duct to be blocked, resulting in the train's second to eighteenth carriage to suddenly lose braking power, causing the accidents.

== Reaction ==
Liu Zhijun, then-Minister of Railways, travelled to the area to look at the rescue operation.
