= Theodone C. Hu =

Chinese civil engineer

- 胡栋朝
- Born: 1872; Haizhu District, Canton, Guangdong, Qing China
- Died: 1957 (aged 84–85); Haizhu District, Canton, Guangdong, People's Republic of China
- Education: Peiyang University; University of California, Berkeley (transferred); Cornell University; Jinshi degree in the Imperial Examination
- Engineering career
- Employers: Bians Yun Lisiya Railway Company; American Bridge Company; Poluyun Mechanics
- Projects: Yue–Han Railway; Chao-Shan Railway

Theodone C. Hu (J. C. Hu, Dongchao Hu, or Zhenting Hu) (1872–1957) was a Chinese civil engineer, librarian, and writer. He worked on many of the early railroads in China.

== Birth and family background ==
Theodone C. Hu was born in 1872 in Huangpu town, Haizhu District, Guangzhou, Guangdong, China.

In 1757, the Qing Dynasty opened a harbor, the Ancient Huangpu Harbor, for international trading in this town. This harbor remained as the only international harbor in China until 1842.

Theodone Hu's father Jianchu Hu (胡建初) was the second son of Honggen Hu (胡宏根). Hu's uncle was Xuanze Hu(胡旋泽). (Hu's ancestors had moved from Chongan in Fujian to Huanpu town during the Yuan Dynasty.) In the mid- to late 19th century, Xuanze Hu was renowned as a community leader in Singapore, and therefore he was appointed as an overseas consul in Singapore. At the same time, Xuanze Hu was appointed as Consul of Russia and Japan in Singapore. He was made a baron by Australia and made a Companion of the Order of St Michael and St George by the British government. For all his success, Xuanze Hu was known simply as "Mister Huangpu" in Singapore. Streets and a school in Singapore are still named after Xuanze. Xuanze Hu also earned his respects and reputation in Singapore community by supporting garden developments, by his charity works, and by providing financial support for Raffles Girls' School. Xuanze thought it important to develop education programs for women, and this idea influenced Theodone's view of women.

== Early years ==
Theodone Hu's father died when Hu was four years old. Thirteen years later, he went to Hong Kong and was raised by his uncle. He enrolled in Queen's College, Hong Kong when he turned 21 years old, in 1893.

== Education ==
In 1897, Peiyang University, the first university in modern Chinese history, was founded in Tianjin. Theodone Hu passed the entrance exam in Hong Kong and studied in the university, where he earned his bachelor's degree in engineering.

Theodone Hu graduated from Peiyang University in 1901, when he was 29 years old. Then he received scholarship to further his education in the United States. He first enrolled in the University of California and transferred in his fourth year (1904) to Cornell University, where he majored in building railroad and bridges. He wrote the book Comparison of column bridges and nail bridges (《比较柱桥及钉桥之用》) and earned his master's degree in civil engineering. He also wrote the book Rail Road of China (《中国铁路指南》), which brought him to the attention of Chinese railway companies.

== Return to China ==
After his graduation, Theodone Hu worked for the Bians Yun Lisiya Railway Company to practice railroad measurement, for the American Bridge Company to practice bridge building and design, and for Poluyun Mechanics to practice building locomotives and drawing the designs for the machine parts.

In 1906, Hu was invited by the governor of Sichuan, Liang Xi, to build railroads, and so he returned to China. His mother died on April 30, so he stayed in Huangpu town for three months.

On the way to Sichuan on July 15, his friend told him that he should go to Beijing and take the Annual National Faculty Exam. He did so, scoring in ninth place out of all test-takers and receiving the title of jinshi from the emperor.

Hu arrived at Sichuan in September, when he received a telegram from home saying that his wife had died. In November, Hu was appointed as an engineer on the Chuan-Han railroad in Sichuan. He led a group of about 20 people (seven assistant engineers, two committee members, seven janissaries) to survey the routes from Chengdu in Chongqing. However, he quit in 1907 due to disagreements with the company. The Chuan-Han railway was not built until 1949. Hu's route for the Chengdu–Chongqing Railway was eventually adopted and built in 1952.

Hu then left for Nagasaki in Japan, then for Vladivostok, and finally Sweden.

== Under the Republic of China ==
From 1914 to 1917, Theodone Hu was appointed a member of the Nanjing Ningxiang Railway Project Board and later as the Director of Beijing Railway Department. He led the survey for many routes, including the Jiang–Zhe railway, Hai–Jing railway, Qing–Xu railway, and Hang–Yong railway. He also drew the Zhejiang Railway General Map.

In 1920, when Hu was 48 years old, he was appointed Project Head of the Yue–Han Railway Supervising Department and took a survey of the Chao-shan railway. In 1922, he was appointed as an engineer in Guangdong Construction Highway Department and took the survey of the road from Chaoguan to Pingshi.

From 1922 to 1927, Hu was worked as the Works Construction Section Chief. During this time, he designed and led the constructions of many roads in Guangzhou. Most of the roads in his native Haizhu District were built under his supervision.

In 1932, when Hu was 60 years old, he was appointed head of the Guangjiu Railway Management Department in Guangdong.

In 1945, at the age of 73, Hu returned to his hometown, Huangpu. There he taught boxing in the local elementary school. He also worked on translating foreign books about railways, planning to publish them. In 1962, Hu's grandson Zhonghua Hu donated his manuscripts to the library in South China University of Technology. Hu also wrote a letter to Jianying Ye, the chairman of Guangdong, and proposed road construction programs in south China.

== Under the People's Republic of China ==
From 1950, Hu worked in the Guangdong Cultural Relics Preservation Committee and fulfilled his "dream of becoming a librarian". In 1955, he went back to his hometown, where he died of illness in 1957.

Hu's home in Huangpu, called Dong Yuan, stands to this day.
