= Chao Chow and Swatow Railway =

Former Chinese railway line (1903–1939)

Chao Chow – Swatow Railway
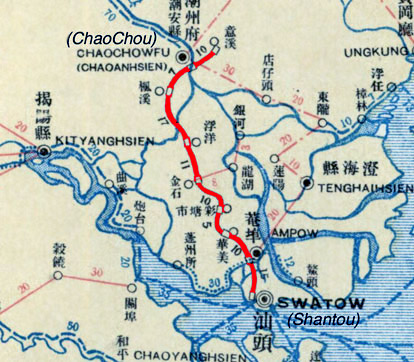

Overview
- Locale: Guangdong Province, Republic of China
- Dates of operation: 1903–1939

Technical
- Track gauge: 1,435 mm (4 ft 8 1/2 in) standard gauge

The ChaoChow–Swatow Railway or "Chao-Shan" railway was a privately financed and constructed standard gauge railway which ran between Chaochow (Chinese: 潮州; pinyin: Cháozhōu) and Swatow (simplified Chinese: 汕头; traditional Chinese: 汕頭; pinyin: Shàntóu) in Guangdong Province between 1906 and 1939. It was the first line to be entirely financed and managed by Chinese merchants.

== History ==
As early as 1888 the British trading company Butterfield and Swire had sought to build this railway but were unsuccessful in gaining permission. In late 1903 a group of affluent overseas and Hong Kong Chinese, headed by Cheong Yuk Nam (pinyin: zhāng yù nán, 张煜南) and his brother Cheong Hong Nam (a.k.a. 张耀轩, Tjong A Fie), invested a total of $300,000 and registered the Chao Chow and Swatow Railway Company with the Chamber of Commerce in Peking (Beijing) and also under Hong Kong laws. Cheong, who was Director-general of the company, had amassed a fortune from sago plantations in Sumatra and from other enterprises in Penang and South China. He was assisted by another prominent businessman, Lim La Sang (pinyin: lín wéi chāng 林为倡), who was appointed Managing Director. Lim, a Fukienese, had been educated in Hong Kong and had then made a fortune as a leading tea merchant in Formosa. In 1904 the contract for construction of the project was awarded to Japanese trading company Mitsui Bussan Kaisha for which Lim himself was an agent.

== Construction ==
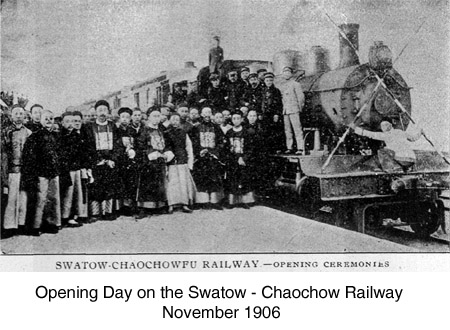

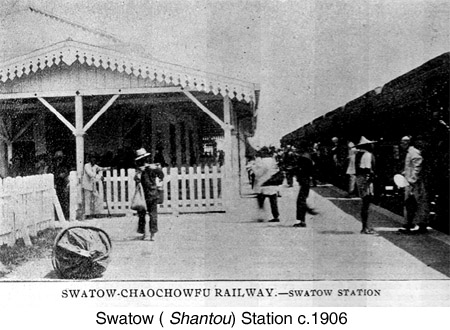

Construction commenced in 1904 under the direction of a Japanese railway engineer Kennosuke Sato (佐藤謙之助). The 39 km (24 mi) line to Chao Chow was completed and opened to traffic on November 16, 1906.

In 1908 a short branch line of just over 2 kilometres (1.2 mi) was extended beyond Chao Chow to the river frontage at I-Chi, a.k.a. Yee Kai (pinyin yì xī, 意溪), in order to earn revenue from freight traffic when the low river prevented navigation by boat.

== Early operation ==
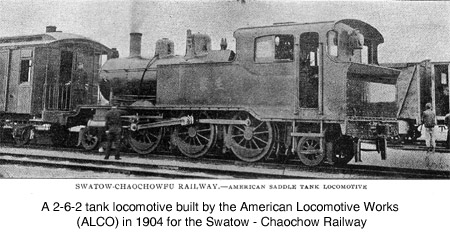

The railway’s senior operations staff, including the drivers and guards, were all Japanese employees, with Chinese staff engaged on less important functions. This situation endured until the railway was eventually taken over by Chinese National Railways in the 1920s. The railway company imported three 2-6-2 tank locomotives from the American Locomotive Company (Brooks plant) and 24 carriages of corridor plan were manufactured in Japan.

== Demise of the railway ==
The railway ceased operations in 1937 when spreading Japanese hostilities prompted the Ministry of Railways to order that this railway and several other lines should be dismantled for strategic reasons. The tracks were pulled up and track bed replaced by a motor vehicle road. The dismantled parts and locomotive equipment were reportedly reused for the construction of the Hunan - Kwangsi (Guangxi) railway as part of the Nationalist Government's "strategic retreat" to the interior of China which was ordered by Chiang Kai-shek (Jiang Jieshi).

== See also ==
- Theodone C. Hu
