= Guangzhou–Sanshui railway =

Railway line located in Guangdong province, China

Overview
- Native name: 广三铁路
- Locale: Guangdong

Technical
- Line length: 49 km (30 mi)
- Track gauge: 1,435 mm (4 ft 8 1/2 in)

Guangzhou–Sanshui railway
- Simplified Chinese: 广三铁路
- Traditional Chinese: 廣三鐵路
Transcriptions
Standard Mandarin
- Hanyu Pinyin: Guǎngsān Tiělù
- IPA: [ɡwàŋ.sán tʰjè.lû]
Yue: Cantonese
- Jyutping: gwong^{2}saam^{1} tit^{3}lou^{6}
- IPA: [kʷɔŋ˧˥.sam˥ tʰit̚˧.lɔw˨]

The Guangzhou–Sanshui railway or Guangsan railway (Chinese: 广三铁路), historically known as the Canton–Sam Shui railway, is a railway line in Guangdong province, built from 1902 to 1904. In 2004, the line merged with the Sanshui–Maoming railway to form the Guangzhou–Maoming railway.

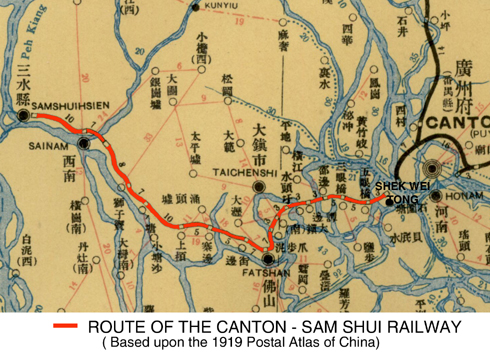
Map showing the route of the Canton to Sam Shui railway built 1902–1904

== Introduction ==
The 32 mile-long railway line from Canton (Guangzhou) to Sam Shui (Sanshui) was constructed between 1902 and 1904 by the American China Development Company. Commencing from its Shek Wei Tong: (simplified Chinese: 石围塘; traditional Chinese: 石圍塘; pinyin: Shíwéitáng) terminus and depot in Canton (Guangzhou) this short line was built as a branch line of the Canton–Hankow (Guangzhou–Hankou) railway and was the first portion of this southern trunk line to be constructed. The first 10 miles from Canton to Fatshan (Foshan) opened in late 1903 and the remainder to Sam Shui was completed and formally opened on 23 September 1904.

== Financing and survey ==
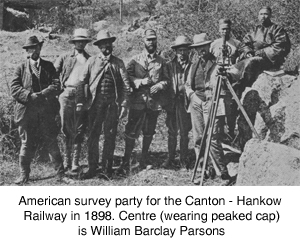

The origins of this railway go back to the so-called “Battle for Concessions” during 1898 when Western powers bickered among themselves over the extraction of railway concessions from the Qing Dynasty government, severely weakened by their loss of the war with Japan over Korea. Not wishing to be left out of the fray, a powerful American syndicate known as the American China Development Company, formed under the auspices of financier Calvin Brice in April 1898, obtained a concession for the construction of the 750 mi (1,210 km)-long Canton–Hankow (Guangzhou–Wuhan) Railway. In the autumn of 1898 a team of American engineers led by Chief Engineer William Barclay Parsons was dispatched to China to conduct the survey. Barclay Parsons describes the difficulties endured during this survey in his own account of this work “An American in China” published in 1900 after his return to USA.

== Construction delayed ==
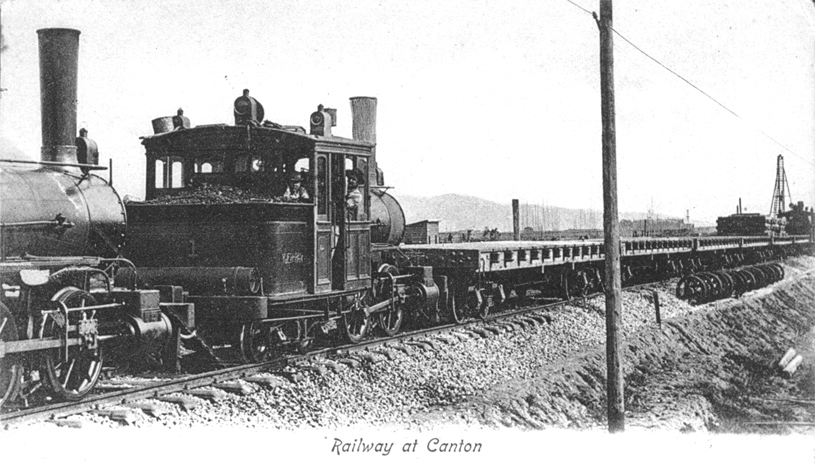
Post card dated c. 1903 showing railway at Canton

The American syndicate soon ran into all kinds of difficulties. The Spanish–American War had broken out causing a shortage of funds. On top of this, the leading driver of the scheme, Senator Brice, died leaving the syndicate without any enthusiastic and wealthy investors. Many of the Americans, who owned shares, became disillusioned and gradually sold out to French-Belgian interests, while the battle for control of the line continued. The next incident to delay the construction was the 1900 Boxer Uprising. However eventually in the autumn of 1902, with the American syndicate now under the presidency of Barclay Parsons, the short Canton-Sam Shui branch line was commenced. The American team of engineers sent to build the branch was headed by Chief Engineer C.W. Mead CE.

== Foshan section ==
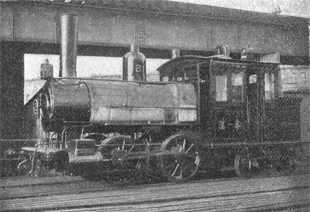
A reconditioned Forney-type tank locomotive from the Manhattan Elevated Railway on the Guangdong–Sanshui railway in 1903

The first section of about 10 miles from Canton (Guangzhou) to Fatshan (Foshan) was double-tracked standard gauge line using 75 lb (34 kg) steel rails. Because of the shortage of funds economies were made by purchasing used equipment from the United States and this included eight reconditioned ex-Manhattan Elevated Railway "Forney"-type tank locomotives, which had been built in 1885–1886 and were designed for running backwards (cab-first). Most of the stations along the route were initially small temporary mat-shed structures and the only permanent station erected in time for the opening of the railway was at Fatshan. This section was opened to traffic in late 1903.

== Sanshui section ==
Construction of the next section from Foshan to Sanshui was then continued and a ceremony attended by the railway's senior staff and a number of invited guests was held on 22 September 1904 to drive in the ‘last (silver) spike’, marking completion of the line. By this time the railway had received its first two-passenger engines which were 4-4-0 tender locomotives built by the American Locomotive Company of Pittsburgh in 1903. In later years it acquired similar locomotives from both the Baldwin and Lima locomotive companies

== Termination of concession ==
While the Guangzhou–Hankou Railway was stalled, the Belgians were making good progress on the Beijing–Hankou Railway. A diplomatic incident arose when it was discovered that the French and Belgians had purchased a majority stake in the American China Development Company. This contravened the Chinese decision to prevent a single foreign power from controlling the Beijing–Guangzhou Railway by awarding two concessions to different countries. Growing opposition to foreign ownership of railways pushed the Chinese government to cancel the American concession in December 1904, putting the Guangzhou–Sanshui Railway into Chinese hands. The Belgian concession for the Beijing–Hankou Railway would also be redeemed in 1909.

== Shek Wei Tong depot and coach building shops ==
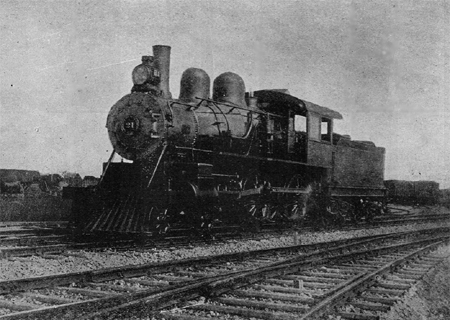
Photograph of 4-4-0 passenger locomotive No.21 built in 1903 by ALCO of USA for the Canton-Sam Shui railway

By 1909 the Shek Wei Tong maintenance depot in Canton had been enlarged and incorporated a machine shop and coach works capable of producing their own 60-foot-long (18 m) steel passenger coaches. The railway still exists and continues to be known as the Guang-San line as far as Sam Shui (Sanshui) from where the line now extends as part of a Provincially owned Sanmao Railway Company (traditional Chinese: 三茂線; simplified Chinese: 三茂线) line to Maoming.
