= Beijing–Hankou railway =

Railway between Beijing and Hankou, China

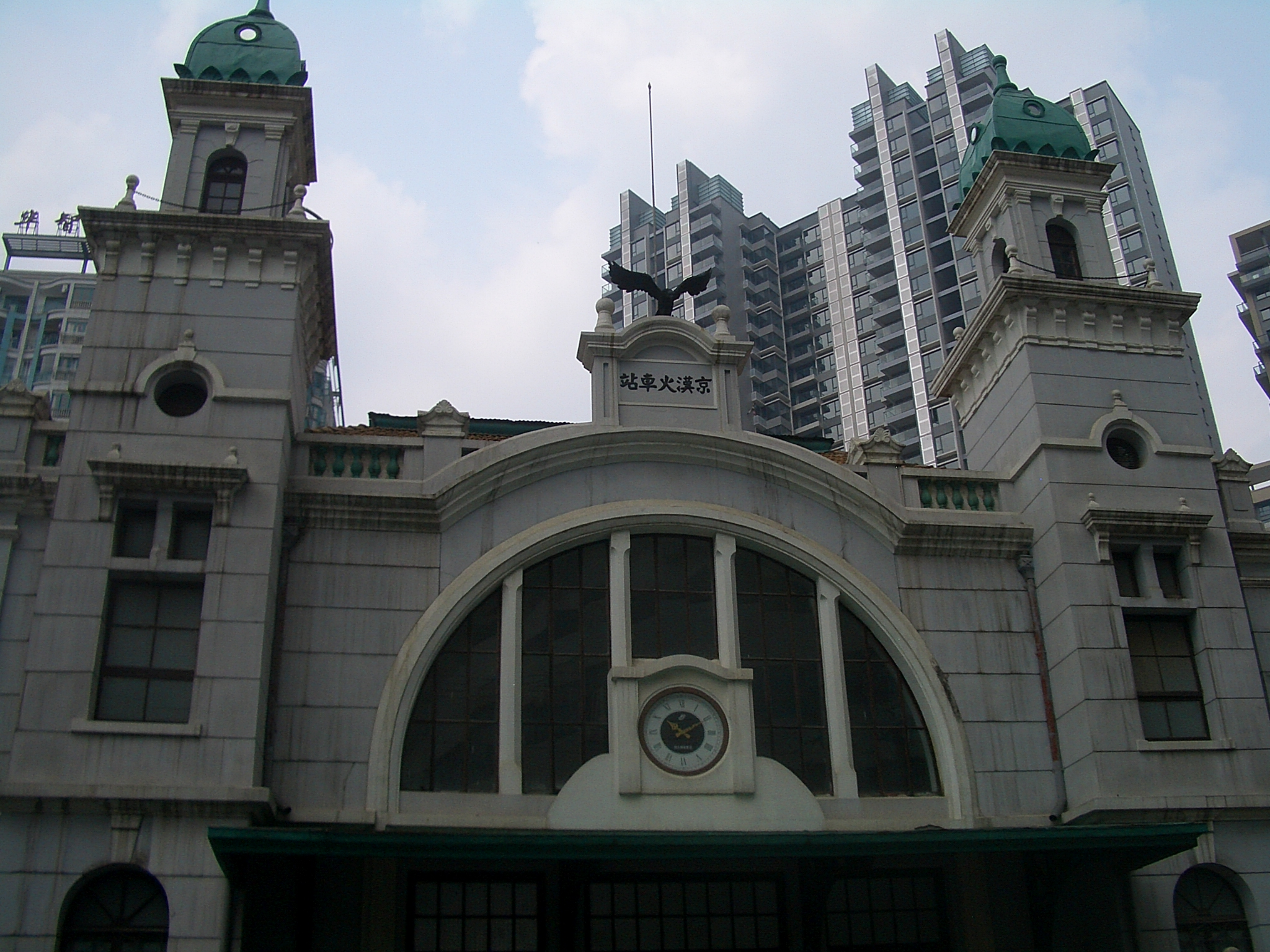
The old Dazhimen railway station, the original Hankou terminus of the Jinghan railway. Constructed in 1900–1903, it was closed in 1991, after the opening of the present Hankou railway station

The Beijing–Hankou or Jinghan railway (simplified Chinese: 京汉铁路; traditional Chinese: 京漢鐵路; pinyin: Jīnghàn Tiělù), also Peking–Hankow railway, was the former name of the railway in China from Beijing to Hankou, on the northern bank of the Yangtze River. The railway was built between 1897 and 1906 by the Société Belge de Chemins de Fer en Chine, a Brussels-based company backed by Belgian and French financing. At Hankou, railway carriages were ferried across the Yangtze River to Wuchang on the southern bank, where they would connect to the Guangdong–Hankou railway. The completion of the Wuhan Yangtze River Bridge in 1957 linked the two railways into a single contiguous railway known as the Beijing–Guangzhou railway.

From 1928 to 1945, when Beijing was known as Beiping, the Beijing–Hankou railway was known as the Beiping–Hankou or Pinghan railway. During the Second Sino-Japanese War, the Japanese advance into central China was known as the Beiping–Hankou Railway Operation.

== History ==
In 1896, the Imperial Chinese Railway Administration was established to oversee railway construction in China. Sheng Xuanhuai attempted to balance the foreign powers by awarding concessions to different countries. In 1897, a Belgian consortium agreed to lend £4.5 million sterling for the construction of a railway between Beijing and Hankou. The connecting Guangdong–Hankou railway was awarded to the American China Development Company in 1898.

Starting in March 1899, the work progressed from both ends. By the end of 1899 the embankments had been completed along a 100 kilometres (62 mi) stretch and 20 kilometres (12 mi) of track had been laid down in the south. In the north there were 60 kilometres (37 mi) of embankments and 10 kilometres (6.2 mi) of track. The Boxer Rebellion halted construction for several months in 1900. All the railway officials were given arms to protect themselves. In the northern stretch from Lugouqiao to Fengtai all the workshops, warehouses and wagons were destroyed and the sleepers were taken. Work continued in the south, where the viceroys ensured protection for the Europeans.

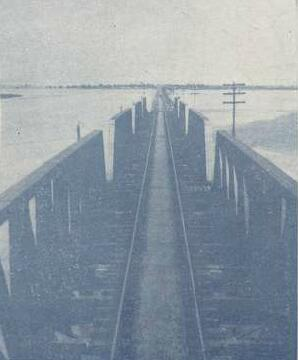
South section of the bridge over the Yellow River, since demolished

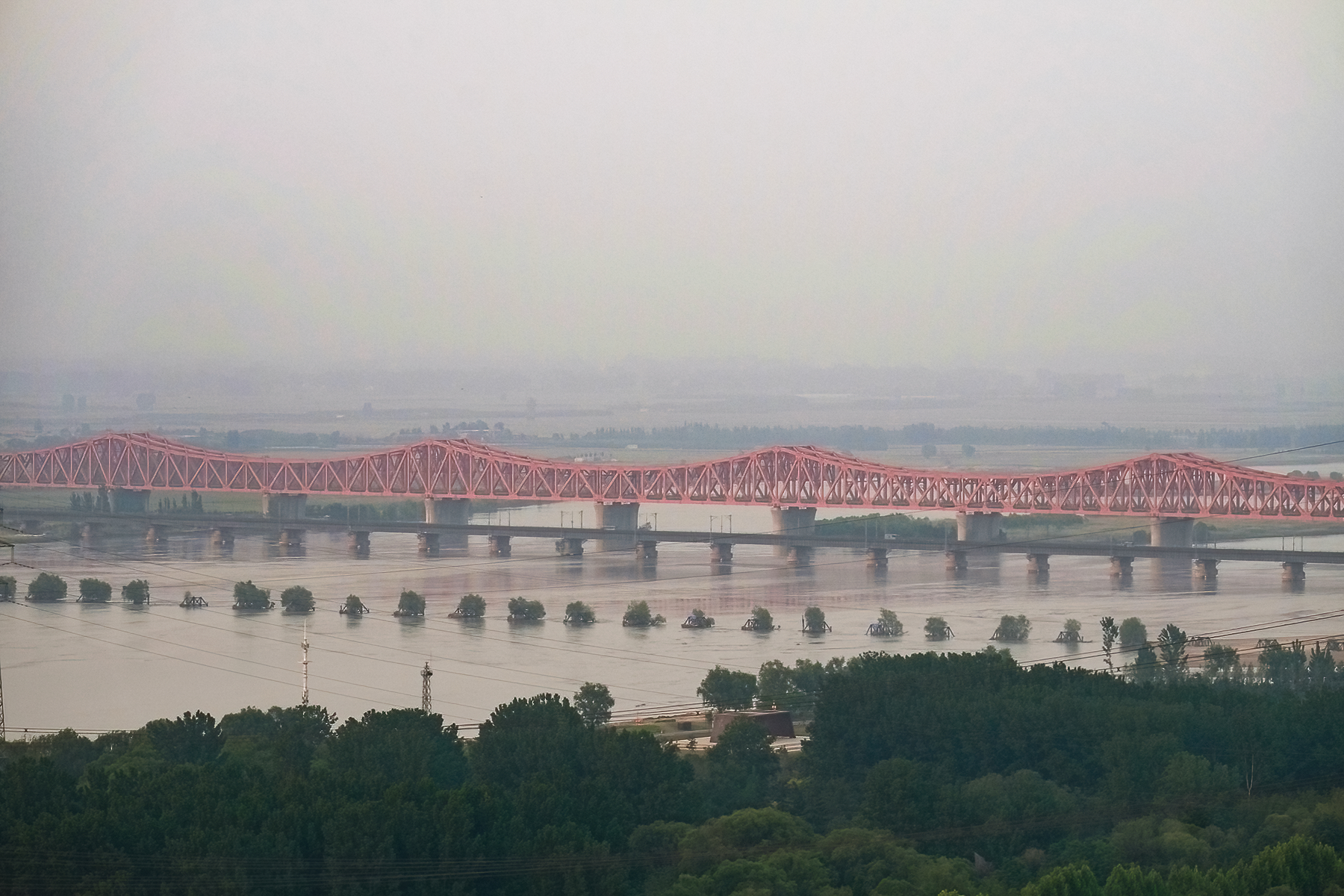
The piers of the 1905 bridge still remain today (in the foreground)

In 1901 the line was extended through the section between Xinyang and Hankou in the hilly land between the Yellow and Yangtze rivers. Only one 500 metres (1,600 ft) tunnel was needed. In January 1902 the Imperial Court travelled along a completed section of the line on their way back to Beijing. In June 1905 the 3,000 metres (9,800 ft) bridge over the Yellow River was open to traffic. The 1,214 kilometres (754 mi) line with 125 stations was opened on 14 November 1905. It was recognized as a major (and profitable) achievement, and the responsible engineer Jean Jadot gained great credit.

The Beijing–Hankou railway was completed in 1906. In the meantime, the Belgians had purchased a controlling stake in the American company that held the concession for the Guangdong–Hankou railway. Most of the shares in the Belgian company were owned by Édouard Empain, and this move threatened to place the entire route between Beijing and Guangzhou under foreign control. Opposition to this state of affairs was especially strong in Hunan.

In 1907, Liang Shiyi proposed the formation of a Bank of Communications to redeem the Beijing–Hankou railway from its Belgian owners. The Bank of Communications was formed in 1908 and provided more than half of the financing needed to buy the railway, the remaining coming from the Imperial Bank of China and the Ministry of Finance. The railway was placed under Chinese control on January 1, 1909, and the successful redemption enhanced the prestige of Liang's Communications Clique.

=== Railway workers' strike ===
The Beijing–Hankou railway workers' strike of 1923, also known as the February 7th strike, was an important event involving this railway. By the end of 1922, 16 workers' unions had been established on the Jing-Han Railway. A ceremony to establish the Federation of Workers' Unions of the Beijing–Hankou Railway was held on February 1, 1923. However, warlord Wu Peifu sent his military police to sabotage the meeting. The Federation protested, and decided on a major strike on February 4, 1923, and relocated its office to Jiang'an, in the city of Hankou. The strike took place on February 7. Wu Peifu sent his troops to besiege the Workers' Union of Jiang'an. The chief of the Jiang'an Workers' Union (Lin Xiangqian) was arrested, and subsequently executed. Workers' movements in Changxindian, Zhengzhou, Baoding, and Gaobeidian were also put down. Union members wore badges at the strike – these were inscribed 江岸京漢鐵路工會會員證勞工神聖 (Member's badge of the Jiang'an Jing-Han Railway Union. Labour is sacred).

== See also ==
- Rail transport in the People's Republic of China
- List of railways in China
- Beiping–Hankou Railway Operation (battle along railway line)
