= Beijing–Guangzhou railway =

Chinese railway line

Beijing–Guangzhou railway 京广铁路

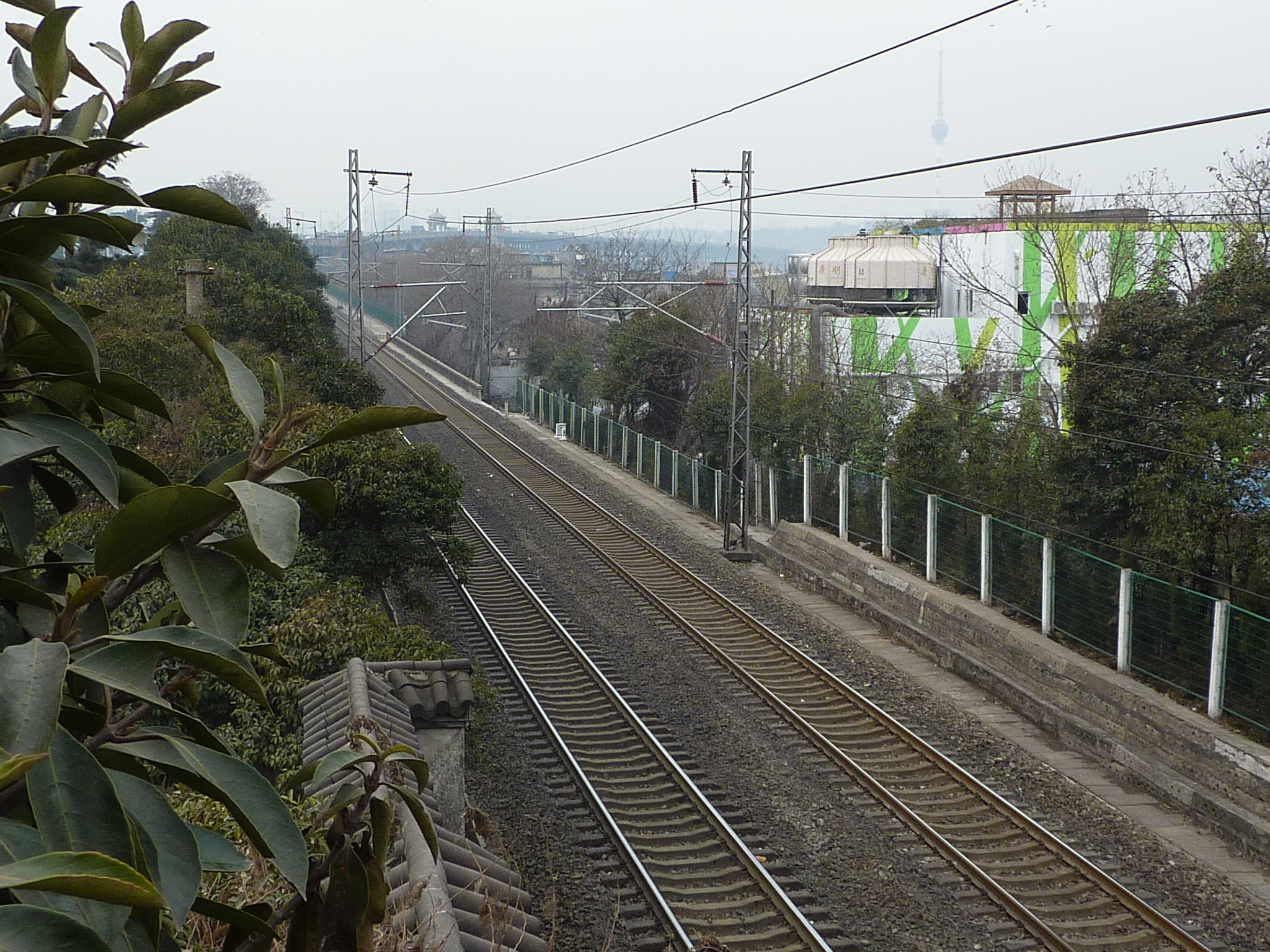
- The Jingguang railway on the Snake Hill in Wuhan. In the far background, the railway crosses the Yangtze over the Wuhan Bridge.

Overview
- Status: Operational
- Locale: Beijing, Hebei, Henan, Hubei, Hunan, Guangdong
- Termini: Beijing Fengtai; Guangzhou
- Stations: 53 active

Service
- Type: Heavy rail
- System: China Railway
- Operator: China Railway

Technical
- Line length: 2,324 km (1,444 mi)
- Track gauge: 1,435 mm (4 ft 8 1/2 in) standard gauge
- Operating speed: 160 kilometres per hour (99 mph)

The Beijing–Guangzhou railway or Jingguang railway (simplified Chinese: 京广铁路; traditional Chinese: 京廣鐵路; pinyin: Jīngguǎng tiělù) is a major trunk railway that connects Beijing in the north with Guangzhou in the south. This double-track electrified line has a total length of 2,324 kilometres (1,444 miles) and spans five provinces through north, central and south China. The line passes through the capitals of each of them: Shijiazhuang (Hebei), Zhengzhou (Henan), Wuhan (Hubei), Changsha (Hunan) and Guangzhou (Guangdong). The line's two terminals are the Beijing West railway station and the Guangzhou railway station.

Due to abundance of large and medium-sized cities on its route, this railway is widely recognized as the most important conventional railway line in China.

== History ==
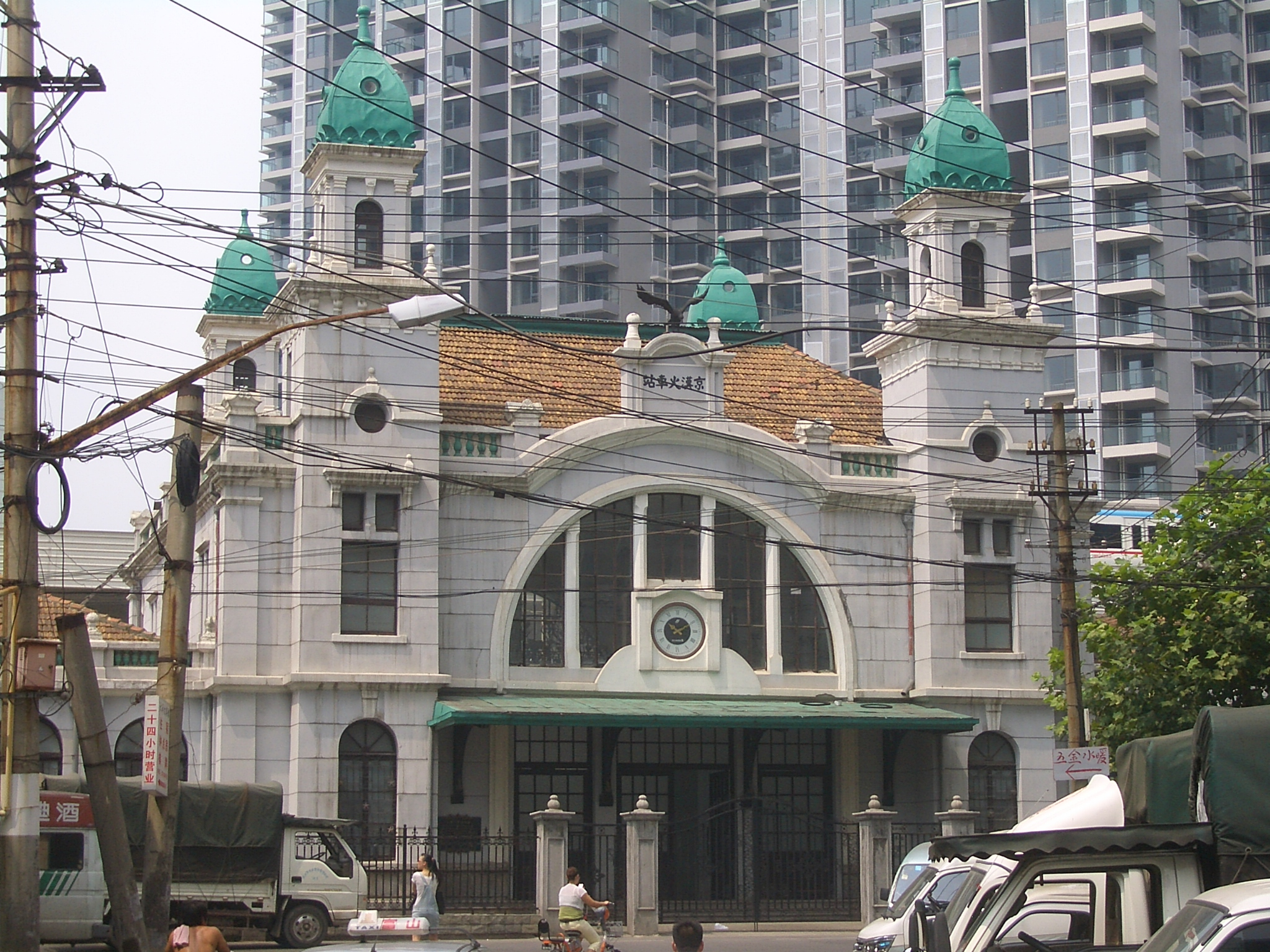
Dazhimen Station in Hankou, the original southern terminal of the Jinghan railway

The Jingguang railway was originally two independent companies: the Beijing–Hankou railway in the north from Beijing to Hankou, and the Guangdong–Hankou railway in the south from Wuchang to Guangzhou. Hankou and Wuchang were cities on opposite sides of the Yangtze River that became part of the present city of Wuhan in 1927.

The 1,215-kilometre (755 mi) long Beijing–Hankou railway (Jinghan railway) was built between 1897 and 1906. The concession was originally awarded to a Belgian company that was backed by French investors. A strong desire to bring the route under Chinese control led to the formation of the Bank of Communications to secure the financing needed to repatriate the railway. The successful redemption of the railway in 1909 enhanced the prestige of the Communications Clique, which became a powerful political force in the early Republic.

Construction of the Guangdong–Hankou railway (Yuehan railway) began in 1900 and progressed more slowly. The concession was originally awarded to the American China Development Company, but a diplomatic crisis erupted when the Belgians purchased a controlling interest in it. The concession was cancelled in 1904 to prevent Franco-Belgian interests from controlling the entire Beijing–Guangdong route. The Guangzhou–Sanshui branch line was completed in 1904. The Changsha–Zhuzhou section was then completed in 1911, followed by the Guangzhou–Shaoguan section in 1916, and the Wuchang–Changsha section in 1918. Work on the final section between Zhuzhou and Shaoguan began in 1929 but was not completed until 1936.

On 7 February 1923, workers of the Beijing-Wuhan Railway Workers' association launched a massive strike demanding better workers' rights and protesting oppression by warlords. The strike, organized by Shi Yang and Lin Xiangqian, was an early example of worker mobilization by the Chinese Communist Party.

In March 1937, the two lines were indirectly interconnected through the railway ferry on the Yangtze River, thus enabling the service of railway services between Guangzhou and Beijing. On 15 October 1957, Wuhan Yangtze River Bridge was completed, and the two lines could be directly connected to form a merged line system until now.

The line was electrified in segments between 1992 and 2001.

== Major stations ==
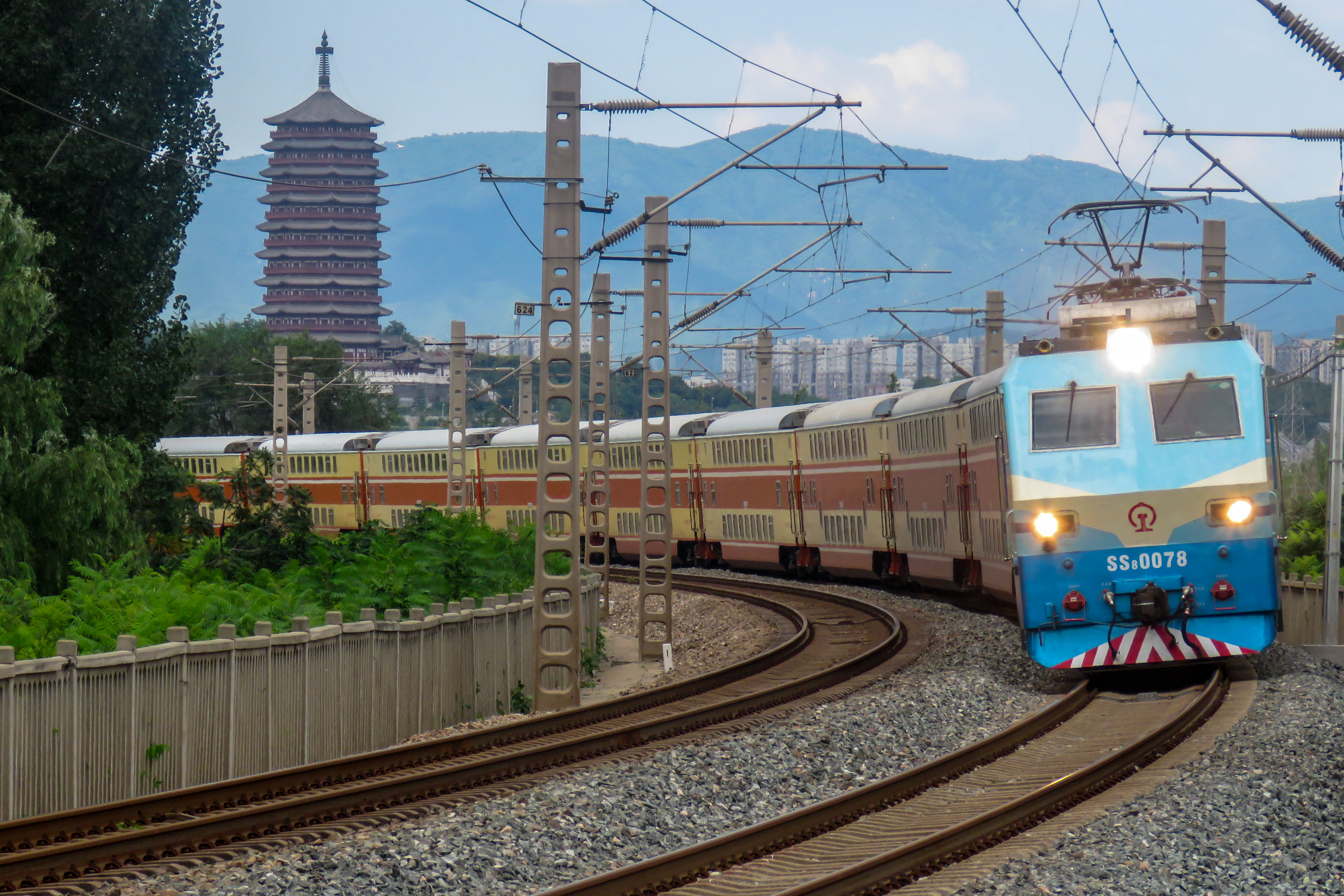
An SS8 locomotive hauling a passenger train at Huaishuling in Fengtai District, Beijing.

From north to south:

km	Station	Metro connections	Province / Municipality
0	Beijing West	7 9	Beijing
0	Beijing Fengtai	10 16	Beijing
135	Baoding		Hebei
270	Shijiazhuang	2 3	Hebei
431	Handan		Hebei
598	Xinxiang		Henan
678	Zhengzhou	1 10	Henan
818	Luohe		Henan
980	Xinyang		Henan
	Hankou	2	Hubei
1,214	Wuchang	4 7 11	Hubei
1,440	Yueyang		Hunan
1,587	Changsha	2 3	Hunan
1,639	Zhuzhou		Hunan
1,773	Hengyang		Hunan
2,073	Shaoguan East		Guangdong
2,294	Guangzhou	2 5	Guangdong

== Service ==
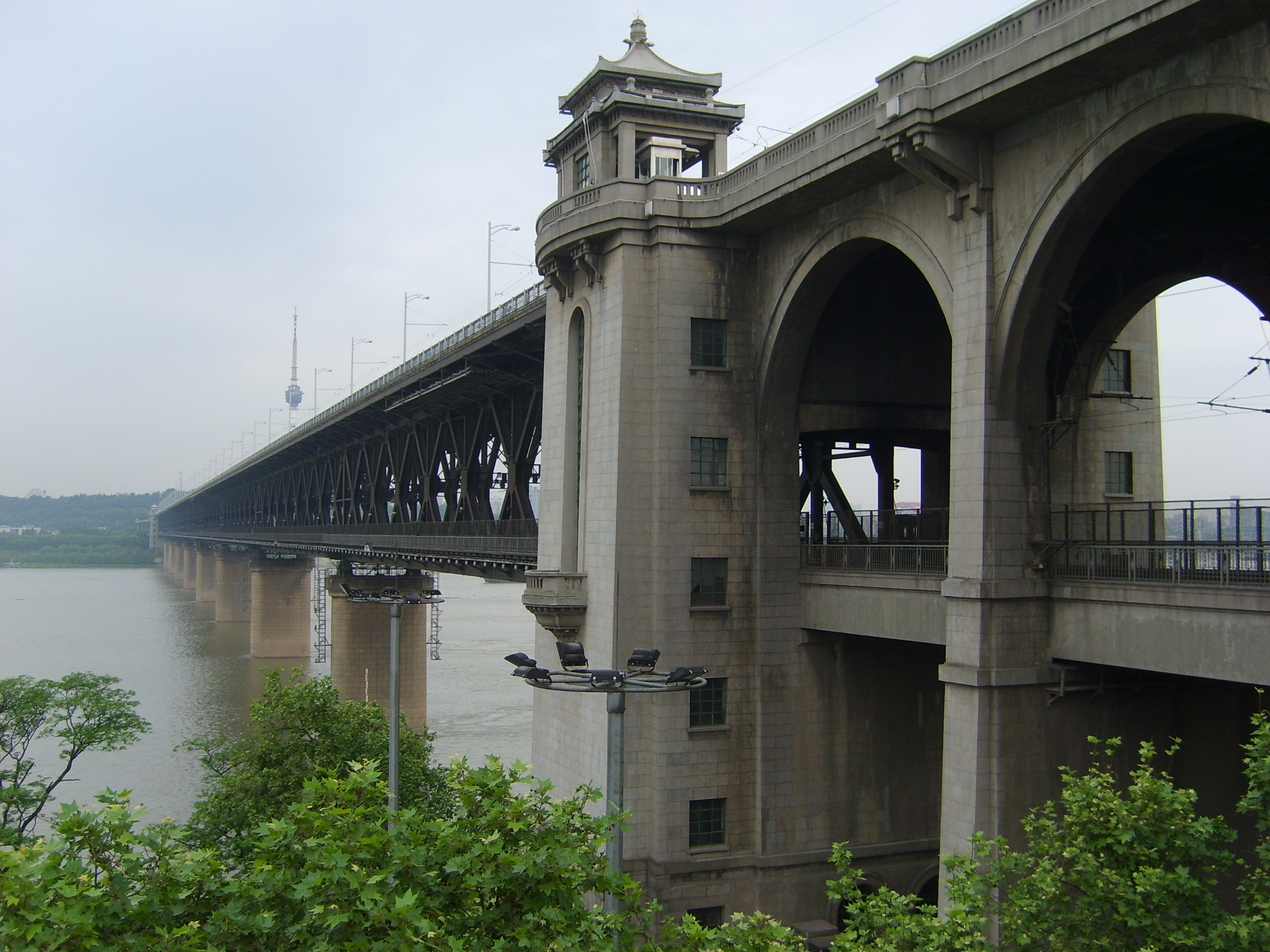
The Wuhan Yangtze River Bridge, built in 1957, connected the Beijing–Hankou railway and Guangzhou–Wuchang railways to form the Jingguang railway.

Currently, the Beijing–Kowloon "Jingjiu" through train operates on this line. Prior to 2003, this train called at stops along the route, before border controls were set up at Beijing, which made the compartments to Kowloon sterile, making the intermediate stops available for use only for domestic passengers in separate carriages attached at Guangzhou East Station.

== Parallel lines ==
The Beijing–Kowloon railway, completed in 1996, is another conventional railway connecting Beijing with the Pearl River Delta. It runs mostly within a corridor 100–300 kilometres (60–190 miles) to the east of the Beijing–Guangzhou railway.

The Beijing–Guangzhou high-speed railway runs through the same major cities as the original railway, on a slightly different route that avoids built-up areas and has a greater curve radius allowing for higher speeds and a somewhat shorter overall length. In most cities along the line, the high-speed trains stop at different, purpose-built stations, rather than the older stations served by the original line. The Wuhan–Guangzhou section of the high-speed railway opened in 2009, and the Beijing–Wuhan section in 2012.

As consecutive sections of the Beijing–Guangzhou high-speed railway became operational, the railway authorities shifted much of passenger traffic from the original railway to the new high-speed line. This allowed an increase in the amount of freight volume transported over the original route. For example, according to preliminary estimates, after the entire Beijing–Guangzhou high-speed railway opens, the annual freight capacity of the northern half of the Beijing–Guangzhou railway (between its two main freight stations, Beijing's Fengtai West railway station and Wuhan North railway station) would increase by 20 million tons.

== Accidents ==
On 29 June 2009, two passenger trains collided at Chenzhou station, leaving three people dead and 63 injured.

== See also ==
- List of railways in China
- Beijing-Kowloon Railway
- Rail transport in China
