= American China Development Company =

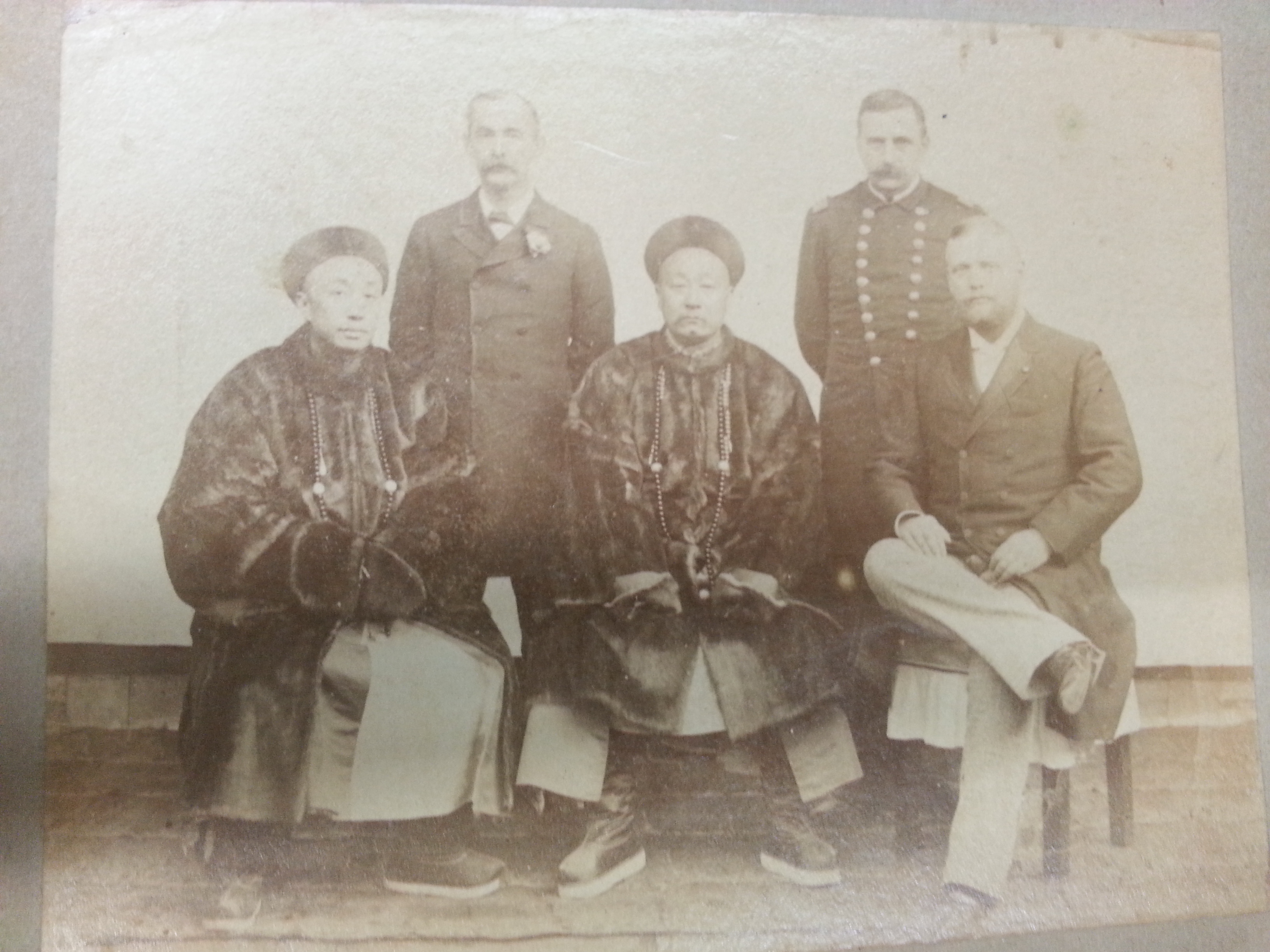
The members of the Cheng Tu Commission, associated with the American China Development Co. From left to right:Secretary of the U.S. Legation in Peking, F.D. Cheshire, Lieutenant Merrill, and U.S. Consul, S. P. Read. Unknown Chinese man, and Sheng Xuanhuai.

The American China Development Company was a company that aimed to gain railway, mining, and other industrial concessions in China. Led by former Ohio senator and railway lawyer, Calvin Brice , the company was incorporated in December 1895. Early stockholders included many well-known American businessmen, including Charles Coster of J.P. Morgan & Company, the Carnegie Steel Company, the presidents of the National City Bank of New York, and the Chase National Bank. The company played an important role in American involvement in China and in the Open Door Policy during the “battle of concessions” at the turn of the century.

== History ==
=== Establishment ===
A.W. Bash, of Seattle, was sent to China in the spring of 1896 as an agent for the American China Development Company, arriving with letters of recommendation from the State Department. Bash also represented a group of American businessmen who aimed to build a railway line that would cross China from north to south. By November 1896, Bash and the director general of the Chinese Railway Bureau, Sheng Hsuan-huai, had reached an initial agreement for the construction of a railway line from the Marco Polo Bridge over the Yongding near Beijing (then romanized as "Peking") to Hankou ("Hankow") in the south on the Yangtze. However, a formal agreement was not reached and Charles Denby, charge d’affaires for the American China Development Company, urged the imperial authorities to instruct Sheng to quickly agree to a contract. This resulted in the Chinese giving the concession to a Belgian group that was funded by Paris financiers and the Russo-Chinese Bank.

=== Canton–Hankow Railway ===
The American China Development Company then pursued the right to build the southern leg, from Wuchang across the river from Hankou to Guangzhou ("Canton") on the Pearl River. America, unlike the Russian, French, German, Japanese, or British Empires, did not have a political stake in the Chinese economy and had significant experience building railroads, which made the American China Development Company an attractive option. In April 1898, the Chinese minister in Washington and A.W. Bash came to an agreement for a loan in which the American company had to market bonds worth 4,000,000, to oversee the construction of the railroad, and to operate it during the fifty years of the loan period. The concession also allowed the company to operate coal mines nearby. The Guangzhou–Wuchang line was the only railway project secured by an American company after 1895, but even this railway line would be lost within seven years.

The project faced uncertainty, given the interest of other powers—particularly France and Britain—in China. As a result, the American China Development Company agreed to share half of their concession for the line with the British and Chinese Corporation in February 1899. A New York engineer, William Barclay Parsons, was sent by the American China Development Company to survey the proposed route during the winter of 1898–1899. After evaluating the costs of the railroad, the company determined that their current loan agreement with China would only fund about half of the costs of the railroad construction. The company reached a supplementary agreement with the Chinese Minister in July 1900, which provided the American China Development Company $40, 000, 000 gold bonds from the Chinese government. However, the supplemental agreement reached between the American China Development Company and the Chinese government made no mention of the earlier affiliation between the American China Development Company and the British and Chinese Corporation.

International competition concerning development interests in China continued to be an issue. In December 1901, the American China Development Company was reorganized, which resulted in the Company taking on two Belgian directors, Senator de Volder of Brussels and Pierre Mali, the Belgian consul in New York. The reorganization also meant that the company became more financially dependent on Belgium, as one of the three banks that now backed the company was the Banque d’Outremer of Brussels. By late 1903, the Belgians were striving to divide the line in order to gain sole of control of the northern portion. In January 1904, Sheng claimed that the Belgians had gained control of the company.

When the American China Development Company first reached their agreement with the Chinese government, they had agreed to remain an American-owned and controlled company, and were not allowed, under the terms of the contract, to sell out to another nation. Many Chinese officials were concerned about the effect of giving concessions to foreign companies, especially those with a political interest in China, like Belgium or France. When Belgian influence increased within the American China Development Company in late 1903 to early 1904, the governors and the members of the upper class of Hunan and Hubei pushed for the cancellation of the American China Development Company's concession to prevent the Belgians from controlling the railway line. In response to the threat of losing their concession, the company asked that the State Department help the American China Development Company regain the majority of the shares of stocks in the spring of 1904. While the United States government was initially supportive of the interests of the American company, as the dispute intensified, the State Department refused to become further involved in the conflict.

The branch line to Foshan ("Fatshan") and Sanshui ("Samshui") was completed between 1902 and 1904.

=== Dissolution ===
In October 1904, work on the railway line had come to a stop. A month later, in November 1904, the imperial government formally notified the charge d’affaires of the American China Development Company of the Chinese government's intention to cancel the concession. Despite American political pressure on the Chinese foreign office, the throne allowed Viceroy Zhang Zhidong to officially revoke the concession in December, 1904. After the loss of the concession for the line, the Belgian king Leopold allowed the Americans to buy back company stock in January 1905. J.P. Morgan bought 1200 shares, making him the new controlling interest in the company. Between January and June 1905, the American China Development Company worked to come to a settlement with the Chinese government for the loss of the concession. Ultimately on June 7, 1905, the American China Development Company and the Chinese came to an agreement: China would pay $675,000 in recompense to cover the properties and bonds sold by the company. In August 1905, the stockholders of the company voted to accept June agreement.

== Company Timeline ==
1895- Company incorporated in NJ
1896- A.W. Bash sent to China as agent of the company
November, 1896- Bash reaches initial agreement with Sheng Hsuan-huai
1898- Bash and Chinese minister in Washington come to loan agreement for the concession of the Guangzhou–Wuchang line
Winter 1898-1899- Parsons surveys the proposed route
February, 1899- American China Development Company agrees to share concession with the British and Chinese Corporation
July, 1900- Company reaches supplementary agreement
December, 1901- Company is reorganized, with two Belgian directors
1903-1904-Belgians gain majority control of the company
Spring 1904- American Development Company seeks support from the State Department
October, 1904- work on railway stops
December, 1904- concession officially revoked by Chinese government
January, 1905- Americans regain control of the company
August, 1905- Company officially agrees to settlement
