= John Maurice Hardman Campbell =

British physician, cardiologist and medical journal editor

- Born: 3 December 1891; Headington, Oxfordshire
- Died: 7 August 1973 (aged 81); Southwark, London
- Known for: co-editorship of the British Heart Journal

John Maurice Hardman Campbell OBE FRCP (1891–1973) was a British physician, cardiologist, and medical journal editor.

== Biography ==
After education at Winchester College, J. Maurice Campbell studied at New College, Oxford, where he graduated with a first-class honours degree in physiology. He was awarded a senior demyship at Magdalen College, Oxford and entered in 1914 Guy's Hospital Medical School, where he graduated in 1916 BM BCh (Oxon.). He joined in 1916 the RAMC, served with the rank of captain in Mesopotamia and North Persia, and was twice mentioned in despatches. In June 1919 he was awarded the OBE for his services with a field ambulance.

In 1920 Campbell returned to Guy's Hospital as a medical registrar. He graduated DM in 1921 and qualified MRCP in 1921. He spent three years (from 1923 to 1925) in the department of physiology working with E. P. Poulton on oxygen therapy and with Marcus Pembrey. Campbell held from 1923 to 1927 a Beit memorial research fellowship, in 1925 resumed clinical work as a medical registrar, and in 1926 became an assistant physician at Guy's Hospital. He was elected FRCP in 1929.

His early publications included papers on respiratory and gastric physiology, paroxysmal atrial rhythm disturbances, complete heart block, the use of quinidine, the heart in thyroid disease, and the effects of exercise on the heart and digestion.

At the National Heart Hospital he began working in 1926 with the cardiologist John Parkinson and in 1930 became there a consultant physician. During WWII Campbell was superintendent of the Emergency Medical Service Hospital, Orpington. At Guy's Hospital he was promoted in 1945 to general physician, and in 1948 became a cardiologist and head of the newly-founded cardiac department.

In 1938, he became the first editor of the British Heart Journal (along with Evan Bedford) which he continued to edit for 20 years until 1958.

The Worshipful Company of Clothworkers sponsored a visitor exchange of senior staff members between Guy's Hospital and the Johns Hopkins Hospital. Under this sponsorship Campbell invited in 1947 Alfred Blalock to Guy's Hospital to perform the first "blue baby operation" in the UK. Campbell identified a number of patients with cyanotic heart disease as possible candidates for surgery.

This led to an intense period of surgical development and close collaboration with Russell Brock and Charles Baker that would make Guy's Hospital famous for its surgery on congenital heart disease and mitral stenosis.

Campbell delivered in 1946 the Lumleian Lectures. In 1958 he retired from active clinical practice but continued to write papers and attend medical conferences. He was president from 1956 to 1960 of the British Cardiac Society and was the chair of the British Heart Foundation upon its inception in 1961. The Royal College of Physicians award him the Moxon medal in 1966.

Campbell published in 1935 a book entitled Sherlock Holmes and Doctor Watson: A Medical Digression and was an active member of the Sherlock Holmes Society of London. In the autumn of 1972 he made a lecture tour of American medical centres.

J. Maurice Campbell's father was the mathematician John Edward Campbell. On 28 August 1924 in Nefyn, Caernarfonshire, Maurice Campbell married Ethel Mary Chrimes, a nurse at Guy's Hospital. He was survived by his widow, two sons and three daughters.

== Selected publications ==
- Campbell, M. (January 1942). "Inversion of T waves after long paroxysms of tachycardia". British Heart Journal. 4 (1–2): 49–56. doi:10.1136/hrt.4.1-2.49. PMC 503483. PMID 18609911.
- with Charles Baker and R. C. Brock: Baker, C.; Brock, R. C.; Campbell, M. (3 June 1950). "Valvulotomy for mitral stenosis". British Medical Journal. 1 (4665): 1283–1293. doi:10.1136/bmj.1.4665.1283. PMC 2037848. PMID 15420459.
- with D. Deuchar: Campbell, M.; Deuchar, D. (14 February 1953). "Results of the Blalock-Taussig operation in 200 Cases of mores caeruleus". British Medical Journal. 1 (4806): 349–358. doi:10.1136/bmj.1.4806.349. PMC 2015442. PMID 13009205.
- with Ralph Kauntze: Campbell, M.; Kauntze, R. (April 1953). "Congenital aortic valvular stenosis". British Heart Journal. 15 (2): 179–194. doi:10.1136/hrt.15.2.179. PMC 479484. PMID 13041997.
- Campbell, M. (July 1954). "Simple pulmonary stenosis pulmonary valvular stenosis with a closed ventricular septum". British Heart Journal. 16 (3): 273–300. doi:10.1136/hrt.16.3.273. PMC 479528. PMID 13182146.
- with D. C. Deuchar and Russel Brock: Campbell, M.; Deuchar, D. C.; Brock, R. (17 July 1954). "Results of pulmonary valvotomy and infundibular resection in 100 Cases of Fallot's tetralogy". British Medical Journal. 2 (4880): 111–122. doi:10.1136/bmj.2.4880.111. PMC 2079269. PMID 13172486.
- with D. C. Deuchar: Campbell, M.; Deuchar, D. C. (October 1954). "The left-sided superior vena cava". British Heart Journal. 16 (4): 423–439. doi:10.1136/hrt.16.4.423. PMC 503904. PMID 13208900.
- with Charles Baker and Russell Brock: Baker, C.; Brock, R.; Campbell, M. (22 October 1955). "Mitral Valvotomy: A Follow-up of 45 Patients for Three Years and Over". British Medical Journal. 2 (4946): 983–991. doi:10.1136/bmj.2.4946.983. PMC 1981177. PMID 13260641.
- with Margaret Turner-Warwick: Campbell, M.; Turner-Warwick, M. (July 1956). "Two more families with cardiomegaly". British Heart Journal. 18 (3): 393–402. doi:10.1136/hrt.18.3.393. PMC 479602. PMID 13342303.
- with Catherine Neill and S. Suzman: Campbell, M.; Neill, C.; Suzman, S. (15 June 1957). "The prognosis of atrial septal defect". British Medical Journal. 1 (5032): 1375–1383, 1390-1 – 1390-2. doi:10.1136/bmj.1.5032.1375. PMC 1973624. PMID 13436794.
- with L. Brotmacher: Brotmacher, L.; Campbell, M. (January 1958). "The natural history of ventricular septal defect". British Heart Journal. 20 (1): 97–116. doi:10.1136/hrt.20.1.97. PMC 492796. PMID 13499774.
- Campbell, M. (11 March 1961). "Place of maternal rubella in the aetiology of congenital heart disease". British Medical Journal. 1 (5227): 691–696. doi:10.1136/bmj.1.5227.691. PMC 1953381. PMID 13690262.
- with P. E. Polani: Campbell, M.; Polani, P. E. (September 1961). "Factors in the ætiology of atrial septal defect". British Heart Journal. 23 (5): 477–493. doi:10.1136/hrt.23.5.477. PMC 1017820. PMID 13690259.
- Campbell, M. (31 August 1963). "Death rate from diseases of the heart: 1876 to 1959". British Medical Journal. 2 (5356): 528–535. doi:10.1136/bmj.2.5356.528. PMC 1872652. PMID 14047434.
- Campbell, M. (21 September 1963). "The main cause of increased death rate from diseases of the heart: 1920 to 1959". British Medical Journal. 2 (5359): 712–717. doi:10.1136/bmj.2.5359.712. PMC 1872892. PMID 14043730.
- Campbell, M. (16 October 1965). "Causes of malformations of the heart". British Medical Journal. 2 (5467): 895–904. doi:10.1136/bmj.2.5467.895. PMC 1846412. PMID 5831199.
- with Richard Emanuel: Campbell, M.; Emanuel, R. (July 1967). "Six cases of congenital complete heart block followed for 34-40 years". British Heart Journal. 29 (4): 577–587. doi:10.1136/hrt.29.4.577. PMC 487836. PMID 6029130.
- Campbell, M. (January 1968). "Natural history of persistent ductus arteriosus". British Heart Journal. 30 (1): 4–13. doi:10.1136/hrt.30.1.4. PMC 459200. PMID 5637557.
- Campbell, M. (July 1968). "The natural history of congenital aortic stenosis". British Heart Journal. 30 (4): 514–526. doi:10.1136/hrt.30.4.514. PMC 487660. PMID 5659398.
- Campbell, M. (September 1968). "Calcific aortic stenosis and congenital bicuspid aortic valves". British Heart Journal. 30 (5): 606–616. doi:10.1136/hrt.30.5.606. PMC 487689. PMID 5676930.
