= WHF =

WHF may refer to:

- Wadi Halfa Airport, Sudan (IATA code: WHF)
- Weihui railway station, Henan, China (telegraph code: WHF)
- We Happy Few, a 2018 video game
- Women in Housing and Finance, a professional association in New York City
- World Heart Federation, association of cardiology associations
- World Holocaust Forum, promotes remembrance of the Holocaust
