= Ignacio Chávez Sánchez =

Mexican educator, cardiologist, and founding member of El Colegio Nacional

Rector of the National Autonomous University of Mexico
- In office 13 February 1961 – 27 April 1966
- Preceded by: Nabor Carrillo Flores
- Succeeded by: Javier Barros Sierra

Personal details
- Born: 31 January 1897 Zirándaro, Guerrero, Mexico
- Died: 13 July 1979 (aged 82) Mexico City, Mexico
- Education: Colegio de San Nicolás
- Profession: Cardiologist

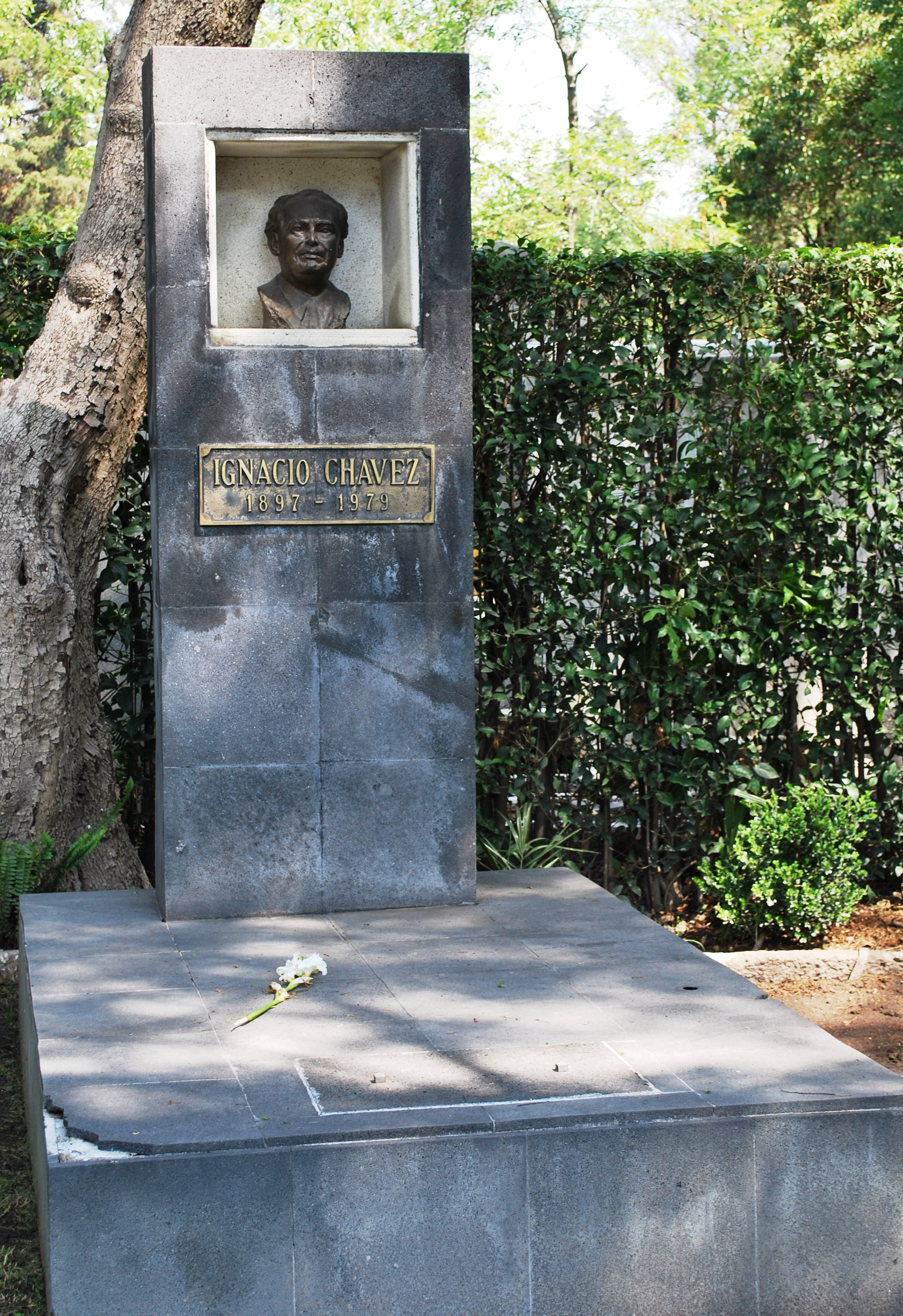
Tomb of Ignacio Chavez in the Panteon Civil de Dolores cemetery in Mexico City

Ignacio Chávez Sánchez, M.D., F.A.C.P. (born 31 January 1897 in Zirándaro, Guerrero – d. 13 July 1979 in Mexico City) was a prominent Mexican educator, cardiologist, and founding member of El Colegio Nacional.

== Education and professional career ==
Dr. Chávez studied at Colegio de San Nicolás and the School of Medicine of Morelia. He received his bachelor's degree in medicine-surgery from the National University in 1920. He was the rector of the Universidad Michoacana de San Nicolás de Hidalgo from 1920 to 1921. He taught several subjects in the School of Medicine of Morelia (1920) and at the National School of Medicine since 1922. He specialized in cardiology in Paris (1921–1927) under Henri Vasquez and Charles Laubry. He was the head of the National School of Medicine (1933–1934). He visited clinics in Berlin, Prague, Vienna, Rome and Brussels to observe their operation and framework. He later founded the first Department of Cardiology within el Hospital General de Mexico (1924–1944). He was also the director of the General Hospital of Mexico (1936–1939). He was the founder and director (1944–1961) of the National Institute of Cardiology, the first hospital of this kind in Mexico, and then he is Director of the newly built Institute, for two and a half years again, starting in 1976. He was the rector of the National Autonomous University of Mexico (March 1965 to April 1966). He was instrumental in establishing international cooperation in cardiology after World War II. He founded and chaired the Mexican Society of Cardiology (1935) and the Interamerican Society of Cardiology (1946). Also in 1946, along with Paul Dudley White and Charles Laubry, he co-founded the International Society of Cardiology, an organization of which he was vice-chairman (1958–1962) and honorary life chairman (after 1962). He presided over the fourth World Congress of Cardiology held in Mexico City in 1962. He was a member of the counseling committee of the World Health Organization (1955) and the Organization of American States (1958–1966). He participated in 18 different cardiology societies in all America and Europe. He was appointed honorary doctor or rector of 95 universities around the world.

Among others, he received the following awards: the National Order of the Honor Legion (France: 1933, 1951, 1966); the Manuel Ávila Camacho Science Award (1945); the Mexico City Medal to the Civic Merit (1945); the General Morelos Medal (Michoacán, 1954); the Eduardo Liceaga Gold Medal (1960); the National Science Award (1961); the American College of Physicians Gold Medal (Atlantic City, 1963); and the Belisario Domínguez Medal awarded by the Senate of Mexico (October 9, 1975).

His statue was uncovered on September 27, 1980, in the park named after him which is located in front of the National Medical Center.

== Writings ==
He wrote, among other works: Lecciones de clínica cardiológica (Lessons on Clinical Cardiology) (1931); Enfermedades del corazón, cirugía y embarazo (Heart diseases, surgery and pregnancy) (1945); México en la cultura médica (Mexico in Medical Culture) (1947); and Diego Rivera, sus frescos en el Instituto Nacional de Cardiología (Diego Rivera, his murals in the National Institute of Cardiology) (1946).

Preceded by Rafael de la Colina Riquelme	Belisario Domínguez Medal of Honor; 1975	Succeeded by Jesús Romero Flores
