= Cixian railway station =

Railway station in Hebei, China

Cixian 磁县

General information
- Location: 2 Youyi Road; Ci County, Handan, Hebei; China
- Coordinates: 36°21′37″N 114°22′19.45″E
- Operator: CR Beijing
- Line: Beijing–Guangzhou railway
- Distance: Beijing–Guangzhou railway: 458 kilometres (285 mi) from Beijing West; 1,838 kilometres (1,142 mi) from Guangzhou
- Platforms: 3 (1 side platform and 1 island platform)
- Tracks: 4
- Connections: Bus terminal

Other information
- Station code: 20555 (TMIS code); CIP (telegraph code); CXI (Pinyin code)
- Classification: Class 3 station (三等站)

History
- Opened: 1904

Services
Preceding station	China Railway	Following station
Handan towards Beijing West	Beijing–Guangzhou railway	Anyang towards Guangzhou
Location
- Location within Hebei Location within China

Cixian railway station (Chinese: 磁县站; pinyin: Cíxiàn zhàn; lit. 'Ci County railway station') is a station on Beijing–Guangzhou railway in Ci County, Handan, Hebei.

== History ==
The station was opened in 1904. Passenger service ended in 2018.
