= Mary Cotton =

Mary Cotton may refer to:

- Mary Ann Cotton (1832–1873), English convicted murderer
- Mary Stewart (athlete), or Cotton, (born 1956), British retired middle distance runner
- Mary Woolley Gibbings Cotton, Viscountess Combermere (1799–1889), Irish author
- Molly Cotton (Mary Aylwin Cotton; 1902–1984), British archaeologist and doctor

== See also ==
- Cotton Mary, a 1999 film
