= Davis Evan Bedford =

British physician and cardiologist

- Born: 21 August 1898; Boston, Lincolnshire
- Died: 24 January 1978 (aged 79)
- Known for: co-editorship of the British Heart Journal

Brigadier Davis Evan Bedford CBE FRCP (1898–1978) was a British physician and cardiologist.

== Life ==
After education at Ipswich School and at Epsom College, D. Evan Bedford entered the Middlesex Hospital Medical School in 1916. In 1918 he became a surgeon sub-lieutenant in the Royal Naval Volunteer Reserve (RNVR) and in 1919 resumed his medical training, graduating in 1921 MB BS (Lond.) and qualifying MRCS, LRCP. After resident appointments at the Middlesex Hospital, he was appointed medical officer in charge of the cardiac wards at the Orpington Hospital belonging to the Ministry of Pensions. In 1925 he graduated MD. At the Orpington Hospital, he was influenced by John Parkinson and in 1925–1926 pursued postgraduate study in France.

Parkinson directed Bedford's interest toward French cardiology, and the time he spent in the mid-1920s in Paris with Laubry and in Lyons with Gallavardin left him with an admiration for French attitudes to study and thinking which he passed on to several succeeding generations.

Returning from France, Bedford in 1926 was appointed Paterson Research Scholar at the London Hospital and assistant physician to the Middlesex Hospital. At the Cardiac Club he became a member in 1928 and was the Club's secretary from 1932 to 1936. In 1931 he was elected FRCP. In 1933 he was appointed physician to outpatients at the National Heart Hospital. With J. Maurice Campbell, Bedford was the co-editor of the British Heart Journal from 1939 to 1947 when he resigned.

He served in the Royal Army Medical Corps throughout the second world war, during which he was appointed consulting physician to the Middle East Forces. Brigadier Bedford became known as an efficient if demanding officer among the medical divisions, from Aleppo on the Turkish frontier to the hospitals behind the Eighth Army in Cyprus, Malta, and Khartoum.

During the war, he kept a detailed diary, chronicling notable events such as his treatment of Winston Churchill, who became ill while visiting Tunis.

When WWII ended, D. Evan Bedford resumed his appointments at the Middlesex Hospital and the National Heart Hospital and established a large private practice in cardiology. In the post WWII era, cardiac catherisation and angiocardiography helped to revolutionise cardiac surgery. Evan Bedford and William Somerville worked closely with cardiac surgeons such as Thomas Holmes Sellors and Russell Brock.

Bedford was appointed in 1946 the Bradshaw Lecturer, in 1960 the Lumleian Lecturer, and in 1968 the Harveian Orator. He was president from 1960 to 1964 of the British Cardiac Society and was in 1963 appointed CBE. He was intimately familiar with the history of cardiology and often quoted from memory such sources as Rokitansky’s Die Defecte der Scheidewande des Herzens, Lower’s Tractatus de Corde, or the writings of the Irish Victorians, Adams, Stokes and Corrigan.

He collected a private library of over 1000 books which he donated in 1971 to the Royal College of Physicians. According to Peter Robert Fleming, the Bedford collection is an indispensable and comprehensive resource for historians of cardiology.

Bedford's interest in collecting rare books on the heart and circulation began when he was a registrar, evolving through his professional life into a unique and internationally acclaimed library now housed in the Harveian Library of the Royal College of Physicians. He spent the last few years of his life cataloguing his collection ... With the publication of the Catalogue of the Evan Bedford Library of Cardiology, Bedford considered his contribution to his craft complete.

In 1935 in Marylebone, London, he married Audrey Selina Ely (b. 1902), daughter of Milton Victor Ely (b. 1873), chair of the Board of Governors of the National Heart Hospital. Evan and Audrey Bedford had two sons.

== Selected publications ==
- Bedford, D. Evan (January 1928). "Aneurysmal Dilatation of the Pulmonary Artery in a Case of Congenital Heart Disease". Proceedings of the Royal Society of Medicine. 21 (3): 441–443. doi:10.1177/003591572802100350. PMC 2101988. PMID 19986262.
- Bedford, D. Evan (May 1928). "Tuberculous Pericarditis". Proceedings of the Royal Society of Medicine. 21 (7): 1162–1164. doi:10.1177/003591572802100712. PMC 2102283. PMID 19986487.
- Bedford, D. Evan (December 1929). "Three Cases of Congenital Heart Disease with Cyanosis, in Adults". Proceedings of the Royal Society of Medicine. 23 (2): 130–134. doi:10.1177/003591572902300233. PMC 2183259. PMID 19987243.
- Bedford, E. (1 June 1933). "A Case of Chronic Rheumatic Disease". Postgraduate Medical Journal. 9 (92): 215–216. doi:10.1136/pgmj.9.92.215. PMC 2532224. PMID 21312819.
- Parkinson, J.; Bedford, D. E.; Almond, S. (1 October 1939). "The Kinked Carotid Artery That Simulates Aneurysm". Heart. 1 (4): 345–361. doi:10.1136/hrt.1.4.345. PMC 503416. PMID 18609830.
- Bedford, D. E.; Papp, C.; Parkinson, J. (1 January 1941). "Atrial Septal Defect". Heart. 3 (1): 37–68. doi:10.1136/hrt.3.1.37. PMC 503458. PMID 18609869.
- Bedford, D. E.; Aidaros, S. M.; Girgis, B. (1 April 1946). "Bilharzial Heart Disease in Egypt: Cor Pulmonale Due to Bilharzial Pulmonary Endarteritis". Heart. 8 (2): 87–95. doi:10.1136/hrt.8.2.87. PMC 480998. PMID 18610033.
- Bedford, D. E. (1 October 1951). "The Ancient Art of Feeling the Pulse". Heart. 13 (4): 423–437. doi:10.1136/hrt.13.4.423. PMC 503691. PMID 14886463.
- Sellors, T. H.; Bedford, D. E.; Somerville, W. (14 November 1953). "Valvotomy in the Treatment of Mitral Stenosis". BMJ. 2 (4845): 1059–1067. doi:10.1136/bmj.2.4845.1059. PMC 2030063. PMID 13094116.
