= Hanji railway–Jiaoji railway link line =

Railway line in Jinan, China

The Hanji railway–Jiaoji railway link line (Chinese: 邯济铁路至胶济铁路联络线) is a freight railway line in Jinan, Shandong, China. It links the Handan–Jinan railway and the Qingdao–Jinan railway, bypassing central Jinan.

== History ==
Construction began in July 2016. The line was opened on 26 December 2019.

== Design ==
The line is 50.5 kilometres (31.4 miles) long and has a maximum speed of 120 kilometres per hour (75 miles per hour).
