= Lorenz Magaard =

German-American mathematician (1934–2020)

Lorenz Magaard (May 21, 1934 – July 1, 2020) was a German-American mathematician and oceanographer. He made essential contributions to the theory of ocean waves and earned particular credit for organizing education and research.

== Life ==
Born in Germany, Magaard attended school in Flensburg from 1944 to 1955 and then studied mathematics and physics at Kiel University. He received the degrees of Diplom in 1961 and Dr. rer. nat. in 1963 at this university. He joined the Institute of Marine Research at Kiel University as research scientist in 1961, as lecturer (German: dozent) from 1969 and as Professor of Oceanography from 1972. He moved to the University of Hawaiʻi at Mānoa, Honolulu, USA, in 1975 and has been a Professor of Oceanography there to this date, since 2009 as Emeritus Professor.

== Scientific work ==
After the start in mathematics with a doctoral thesis on the embedding of Riemannian spaces into Einstein spaces and conformally-euclidean spaces, (Note: Website of the International Pacific Research Center. Access on 19 January 2017.) the theory of ocean waves was in the focus of most of Magaard’s ensuing research. During his work in Kiel, the dominating topics were internal wave research in the stratified Baltic Sea and their generation (Note: Wolfgang Krauss, Lorenz Magaard: ”Zum Spektrum der internen Wellen der Ostsee.” In: “Kieler Meeresforschungen” 17, 1961, p. 136–147 (Energy spectra of the internal movements of the Baltic Sea).) (Note: Lorenz Magaard: ”Zur Theorie zweidimensionaler nichtlinear interner Wellen in stetig geschichteten Medien.” In: ”Kieler Meeresforschungen” 21, 1965, p. 22–23) (On the theory of two-dimensional nonlinear internal waves in continuously stratified media).) (Note: Lorenz Magaard: ”Ein Beitrag zur Theorie der internen Wellen als Störungen geostrophischer Strömungen.” In: ”Deutsche Hydrographische Zeitschrift” 21, 1968, p. 241–278 (A contribution to the theory of internal waves as perturbations of geostrophic currents).) (Note: Walter Zenk, Gerold Siedler, Peter C. Wille, Gerd Wegner, Jörn Thiede, Volker Storch, Peter Speth, Eberhard Ruprecht, Manfred Ehrhardt, Bernt Zeitzschel: ”Early oceanography and the development of physical and chemical marine sciences in Kiel after World War II”. In: ”Deutsches Schiffahrtsarchiv, Wissenschaftliches Jahrbuch des Deutschen Schiffahrtsmuseums”, Bremerhaven, 39, 2018, p. 53, (given year date 2016, but published in 2018) (ISSN 0343-3668, ISBN 978-3-86927-039-5).) (Note: Website of gesis SSOAR. Access on 23 January 2017.) and the seiche system in the Baltic Sea. (Note: Wolfgang Krauss, Lorenz Magaard: ”Zum System der Eigenschwingungen der Ostsee.” In: ”Kieler Meeresforschungen” 18, 1962, p. 184–186 (On the seiches system of the Baltic Sea).) (Note: Lorenz Magaard, Wolfgang Krauss: ”Spektren der Wasserstandsschwankungen der Ostee im Jahre 1958.” In: ”Kieler Meeresforschungen” 22, 1966, p. 155–162 (Spectra of the 1958 sea level records in the Baltic).) After moving to Honolulu, wave studies were extended to other regions. (Note: Lorenz Magaard: ”On the generation of internal gravity waves by a fluctuating buoyancy flux at the sea surface.” In: ”Geophysical Fluid Dynamics” 5, 1973, p. 101–111.) (Note: Website of Taylor Francis Online. Access on 02 February 2017.) (Note: Lorenz Magaard, William D. McKee: ”Semi-diurnal tidal currents at site-D.” In: ”Deep-Sea Research” 20, 1973, p. 997–1009.) (Note: Website of Elsevier Science Direct. Access on 02 February 2017.) (Note: William J. Emery, Lorenz Magaard: ”Baroclinic Rossby waves as inferred from temperature fluctuations in the Eastern Pacific.” In: ”Journal of Marine Research” 34, 1976, p. 365–385.) (Note: Jim M. Price, Lorenz Magaard: ”Rossby wave analysis of the baroclinic potential energy in the upper 500 meters of the North Pacific.” In: ”Journal of Marine Research” 38, 1980, p. 249–264.) (Note: Lorenz Magaard: ”On the potential energy of baroclinic Rossby waves in the North Pacific.” In: ”Journal of Physical Oceanography” 13, 1983, p. 38–42.) (Note: Jim M. Price, Lorenz Magaard: ”Rossby wave analysis of subsurface temperature fluctuations along the Honolulu-San Francisco great circle.” In: ”Journal of Physical Oceanography” 13, 1983, p. 258–268.) (Note: Laurence A. Mysak, Lorenz Magaard: ”Rossby wave driven Eulerian mean flows along non-zonal barriers, with application to the Hawaiian Ridge.” In: “Journal of Physical Oceanography” 13, 1983, p. 1716–1725.) (Note: William J. Emery, William G. Lee, Lorenz Magaard: ”Geographic and seasonal distributions of Brunt-Vaisala frequency and Rossby radii in the North Pacific and North Atlantic. ” In: “Journal of Physical Oceanography” 14, 1984, p. 294–317.) (Note: Jim M. Price, Lorenz Magaard: ”Interannual baroclinic Rossby waves in the mid-latitude North Atlantic.” In: ”Journal of Physical Oceanography” 16, 1986, p. 2061–2070.) (Note: Federico Graef, Lorenz Magaard: ”Reflection of nonlinear baroclinic Rossby waves and the driving of secondary mean flows.” In: ”Journal of Physical Oceanography” 24, 1994, p. 1867–1894.) Other research concerned the eddy (fluid dynamics) energy in the ocean (Note: Klaus Wyrtki, Lorenz Magaard, James Hager: ”Eddy energy in the oceans.” In: ”Journal of Geophysical Research” 81, 1976, p. 2641–2646 (DOI: 10.1029/JC081i015p02641).) and shear flow instabilities in the western Pacific Ocean. (Note: Jae-Yul Yun,, Jim M. Price, Lorenz Magaard: ”Radiating instability of non-zonal oceanic shear flows with application to the Kuroshio Extension Current.” In: ”Journal of Physical Oceanography” 25, 1995, p. 1788–1804.) (Note: Jae-Yul Yun, Jim M. Price, Lorenz Magaard: ”Recalculated radiating instabilities using the correct matching and boundary conditions.” In: ”Journal of Physical Oceanography” 25, 2000, p.1788–1804.) His publications comprise 7 contributions to books and 38 articles in refereed journals. In teaching, both in Kiel and Honolulu, he dealt with surface and internal waves in the ocean, the tide, turbulence and dimensional analysis. He added the topic of ocean governance at the University of Hawaiʻi.

== Offices ==
At the University of Hawai'i:

- Chair, Graduate Field of Study in Oceanography, 1984 - 1990
- Chair, Department of Oceanography, 1984 – 1990
- Acting Associate Dean, School of Ocean and Earth Science and Technology (SOEST), 1989 – 1991
- Acting Dean, SOEST, 1999
- Associate Dean, SOEST, 1992 – 2000
- Director of Education, Marine Bioproducts Engineering Center, 2000 – 2001
- Chair, Department of Oceanography, 2005 – 2006
- Director, International Center for Climate and Society, from 2003 (Note: Website of the International Center for Climate and Society. Access on 19 January 2017.)
- Executive Associate Director, International Pacific Research Center (IPRC), 1998 – 2008

== Awards ==
- Liège University Medal, Liège, Belgium, 1973
- PACON (Pacific Congress on Marine Science and Technology) Service Award, 1998; PACON International Award, 2000; PACON Fellow Award, 2007 (Note: Website of the University of Hawaii. Access on 22 January 2017.) (Note: Website of the Starbulletin Hawaii. Access on 22 January 2017.)
- Fellow, Marine Technology Society, 2001 (Note: Website of the Marine Technology Society. Access on 19 January 2017.)

== See also ==
- Campbell–Magaard theorem

== Publications ==
English translations of German titles are given in brackets.
