= Handan railway station =

Railway station in Handan, Hebei, China

Handan 邯郸
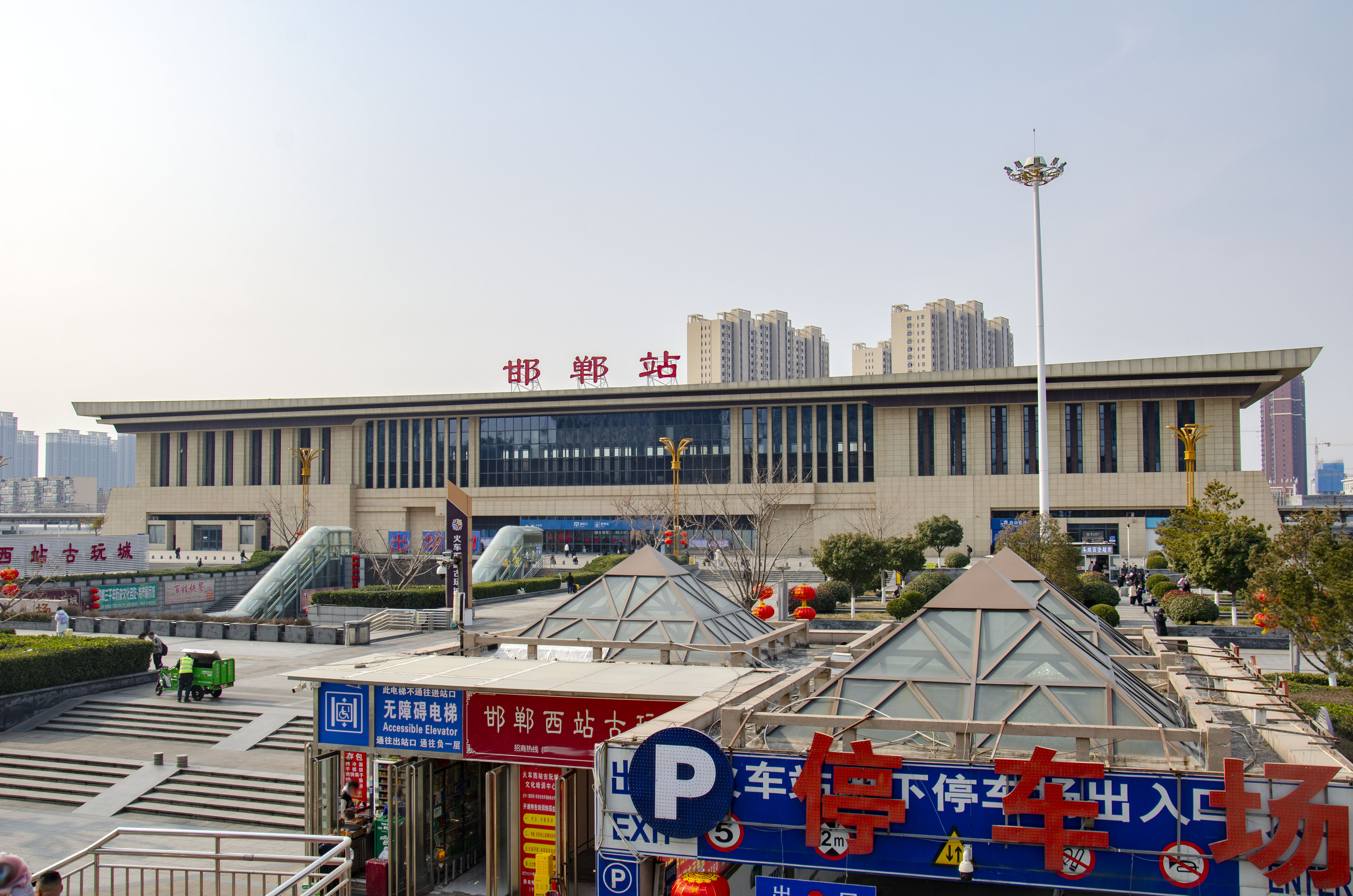
- Handan railway station in January 2025

General information
- Location: 2 Chezhan Square; Hanshan District, Handan, Hebei; China
- Coordinates: 36°36′9.67″N 114°28′33.38″E
- Operator: CR Beijing
- Lines: Beijing–Guangzhou railway; Handan–Changzhi railway; Handan–Jinan railway
- Distance: Beijing–Guangzhou railway: 428 kilometres (266 mi) from Beijing West; 1,868 kilometres (1,161 mi) from Guangzhou
- Platforms: 5 (1 side platform and 2 island platforms)
- Tracks: 9
- Connections: Bus terminal

Other information
- Station code: 20519 (TMIS code); HDP (telegraph code); HDA (Pinyin code)
- Classification: Class 1 station (一等站)

History
- Opened: 1904

Services
Preceding station	China Railway	Following station
Shaheshi towards Beijing West	Beijing–Guangzhou railway	Anyang towards Guangzhou
Location
- Location within Hebei Location within China

Handan railway station (Chinese: 邯郸站) is a station in Handan, Hebei. The station is on the Beijing–Guangzhou railway and serves as the eastern terminus of Handan–Changzhi railway and the western terminus of Handan–Jinan railway.

== History ==
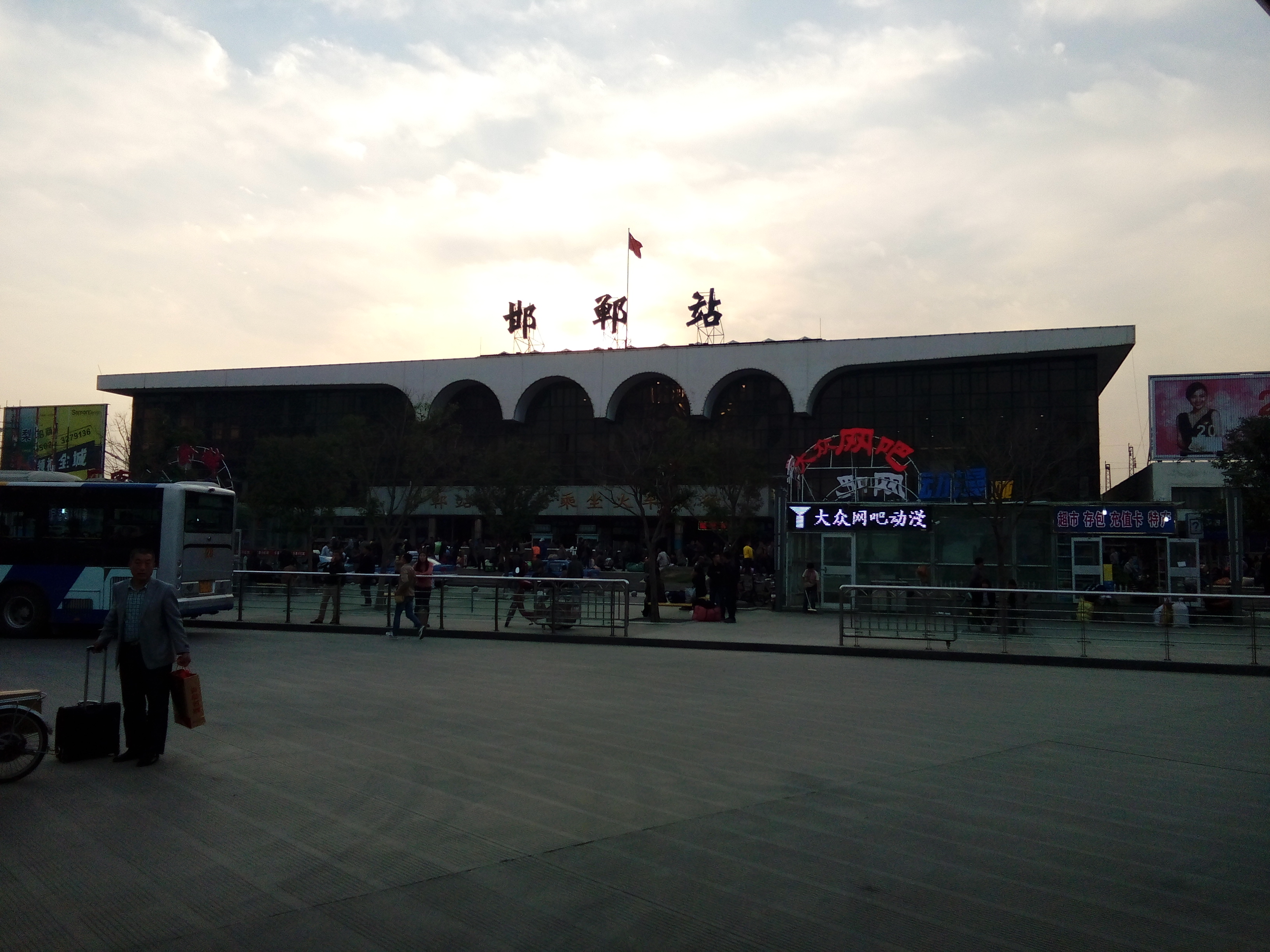
The station building before renovation

The station was opened in 1904.

During 2015–2018, the station underwent a renovation project. The new station building, covering an area of 15,000 square metres (160,000 sq ft), was opened on 10 July 2018.

== See also ==
- Handan East Railway Station
