= Louis Wolff =

American cardiologist

Louis Wolff (April 14, 1898 – January 28, 1972) was an American cardiologist and college professor. He was the chief of the electrocardiographic laboratory at Beth Israel Hospital in Boston from 1928 to 1964. In 1930, Wolff described the Wolff-Parkinson-White syndrome with John Parkinson and Paul Dudley White.

== Early life ==
Wolff was born in Boston, Massachusetts in 1898. His parents immigrated to the United States from Lithuania but had previously lived in Peru and London. His childhood was spent in Revere, Massachusetts and South Boston, Massachusetts. He attended The English High School in Jamaica Plain, Massachusetts.

Wolff went to the Massachusetts Institute of Technology, graduating with a degree in biology and public health in 1918. He played violin and conducted in a dance orchestra to pay for college. After graduation, he considered going to Europe to study music; because World War I, he remained in the United States and went to medical school.

He enrolled in Harvard Medical School and graduated in 1922. He completed an internship at the Massachusetts General Hospital from 1922 to 1924

== Career ==
Wolff continued to work at the Massachusetts General Hospital with Paul Dudley White, staying there from 1924 to 1928. Next, he worked at the Beth Israel Hospital in Boston as the chief of the electrocardiographic laboratory, remaining in this position from 1928 until his retirement in 1964. In 1930, Wolffe described the eponymously named Wolff-Parkinson-White syndrome with John Parkinson and Paul Dudley White. He also conducted pioneering work in vectorcardiography.

Wolfe was also a clinical professor of medicine at Harvard Medical School. He published the textbook Electrocardiography in Fundamentals and Clinical Application in 1950. He served as president of the New England Cardiovascular Society.

== Personal life ==
In 1920, Wolff married Alice Muscanto, a flute player born in Vilnius, Lithuania. She played with her sisters and brothers in Muscanto's Russian Orchestra, a touring musical ensemble founded by her father Leon Muscanto. Louis and Alice had two children, Lea Wolff and Richard Wolff. They lived in Brookline, Massachusetts.

After Alice's death, Wolff married Phyllis Raftell; the daughter of Greek immigrants who had previously worked as Wolff's medical secretary. They had two children, Sarah Wolff and Charles Wolff.

Wolff died of Parkinson's disease in the Beth Israel Hospital on January 28, 1972. His funeral services were held in the Levine Chapel in Brookline. He was buried in Moses Mendelsohn Cemetery. Two of his children entered the medical field: Richard became a cardiologist and Charles became a physician.

== Selected publications ==
- Wolff, Louis; Parkinson, John; White, Paul D. (August 1930). "Bundle-Branch Block with Short P-R Interval in Healthy Young People Prone to Paroxysmal tachycardia". Annals of Noninvasive Electrocardiology. 5 (6): 685–705. doi:10.1111/j.1542-474X.2006.00127.x. PMC 6932258. PMID 17040283.
- Wolff, Louis. Electrocardiography in Fundamentals and Clinical Application. Philadelphia: WB Saunders, 1950.
