= Heart (journal) =

- Discipline: Cardiology
- Language: English
- Edited by: Kazem Rahimi

Publication details
- Former name: British Heart Journal
- History: 1939-present
- Publisher: BMJ Group
- Frequency: Biweekly
- Open access: Hybrid
- Impact factor: 4.4 (2025)

Standard abbreviations
- ISO 4: Heart

Indexing
- CODEN: HEARFR
- ISSN: 1355-6037 (print); 1468-201X (web)
- OCLC no.: 34055332

Links
- Journal homepage; Online access; Online archive

Heart is a biweekly peer-reviewed medical journal covering all areas of cardiovascular medicine and surgery. It is the official journal of the British Cardiovascular Society. It was established in 1939 as the British Heart Journal and is published by the BMJ Group. The name was changed from British Heart Journal to Heart in 1996 with the start of volume 75. The editor-in-chief is Kazem Rahimi (University of Oxford).

A sister journal, Open Heart, was established in 2010 with the aim of covering cardiovascular research with less emphasis on novelty or priority.

== History ==
In 2010, Heart established a sister journal, Heart Asia. It was the official journal of the Asia Pacific Heart Association and aimed to focus on cardiovascular research in the Asia Pacific region. In 2019, the journal ceased publication.

== Abstracting and indexing ==
The journal is abstracted and indexed by Index Medicus, Science Citation Index Expanded, EMBASE, and Scopus. According to the Journal Citation Reports, its 2023 impact factor is 5.1, ranking it 38th out of 222 journals in the category "Cardiac and Cardiovascular Systems".

== Editors-in-chief ==
The following persons have been editor-in-chief of the journal:

- Davis Evan Bedford, John Maurice Hardman Campbell 1939-?
- K. Shirley Smith ?-1972
- Walter Somerville 1973-?
- Roger Hall ?-2006
- Adam Timmis 2007-2013
- Catherine Otto 2014 - 2023
- Kazem Rahimi 2023 - present

== Most cited articles ==
According to Scopus, the following three articles from Heart have been cited most often (>700 times):

- Day CP, McComb JM, Campbell RW (June 1990). "QT dispersion: an indication of arrhythmia risk in patients with long QT intervals". British Heart Journal. 63 (6): 342–4. doi:10.1136/hrt.63.6.342. PMC 1024518. PMID 2375895.
- Jenni R, Oechslin E, Schneider J, Attenhofer Jost C, Kaufmann PA (December 2001). "Echocardiographic and pathoanatomical characteristics of isolated left ventricular non-compaction: a step towards classification as a distinct cardiomyopathy". Heart. 86 (6): 666–71. doi:10.1136/heart.86.6.666. PMC 1730012. PMID 11711464.
- Wilkins GT, Weyman AE, Abascal VM, Block PC, Palacios IF (October 1988). "Percutaneous balloon dilatation of the mitral valve: an analysis of echocardiographic variables related to outcome and the mechanism of dilatation". British Heart Journal. 60 (4): 299–308. doi:10.1136/hrt.60.4.299. PMC 1216577. PMID 3190958.
