= John Cripps =

John Cripps may refer to:

- John Marten Cripps, English traveller and antiquarian
- John Cripps (journalist), British journalist
- John Cripps (horticulturalist), British-Australian horticulturalist

== See also ==
- John Cripps Pembrey Jnr
