= Paul Dudley White =

American cardiologist (1886–1973)

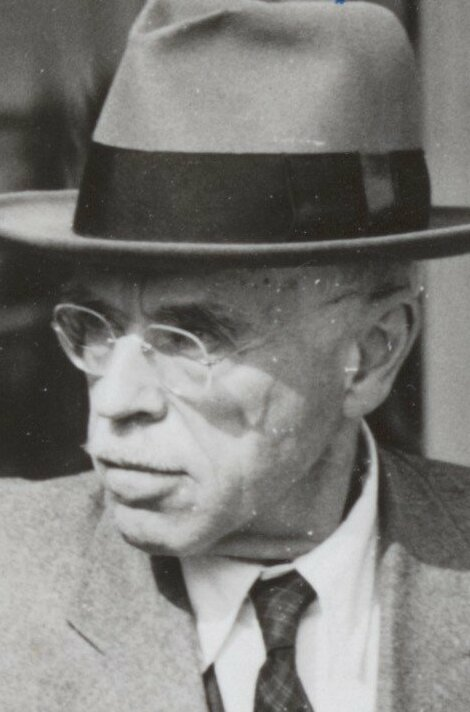
- Born: June 6, 1886; Roxbury, Boston, Massachusetts, U.S.
- Died: October 31, 1973 (aged 87); New York City, U.S.
- Education: Harvard College; Harvard Medical School
- Scientific career
- Fields: Medicine; Cardiology
- Workplaces: Massachusetts General Hospital
- Notable students: S. I. Padmavati

Paul Dudley White (June 6, 1886 – October 31, 1973) was an American physician and cardiologist. He was considered one of the leading cardiologists of his day, and a prominent advocate of preventive medicine.

== Early life and education ==
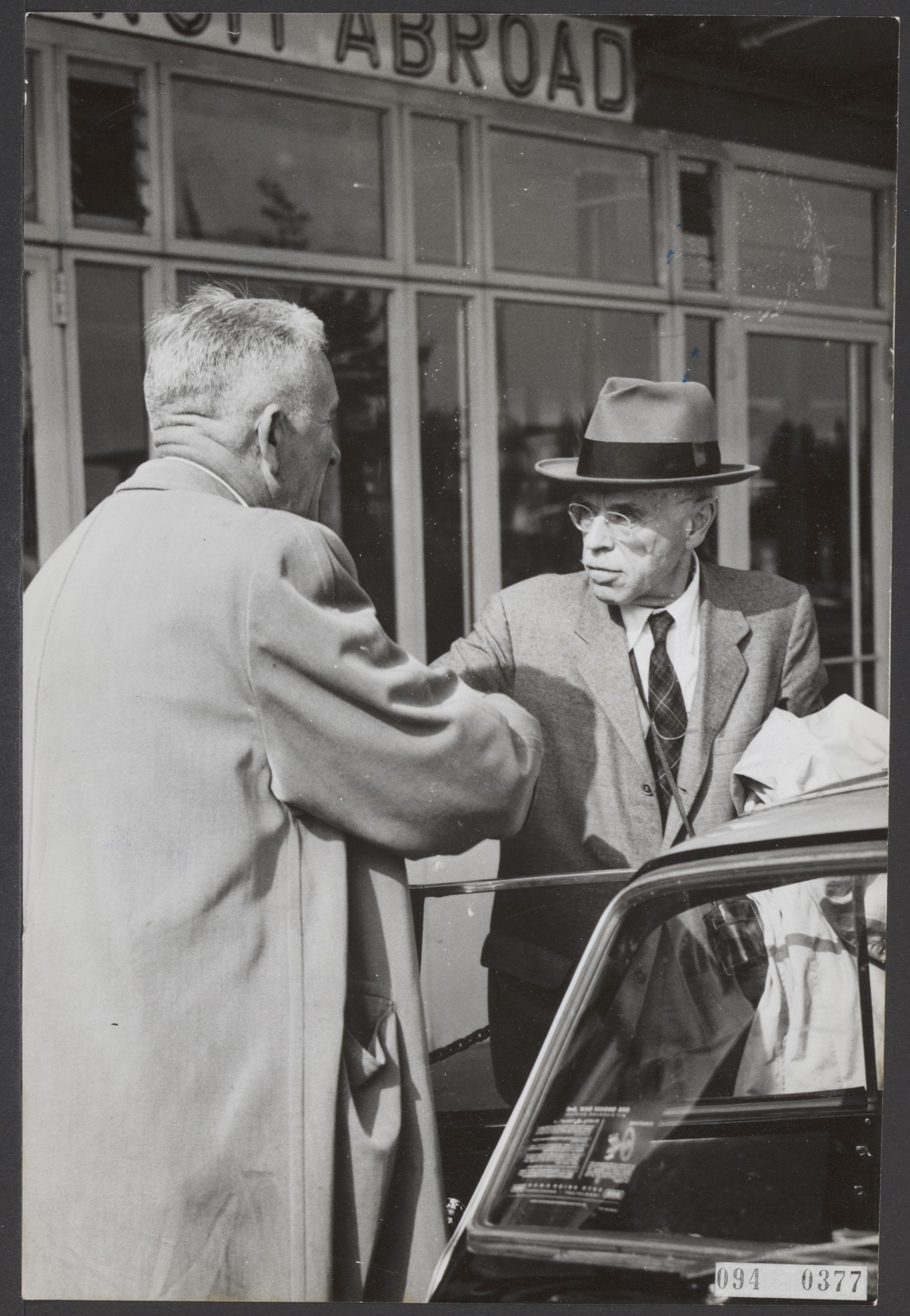
Dudley White 1966

White was born in Roxbury, Massachusetts, the son of Herbert Warren White and Elizabeth Abigail Dudley. White's interest in medicine was sparked early in life, when he accompanied his father, a family practitioner, on rounds and house calls in a horse and buggy. A 1903 graduate of the Roxbury Latin School, his undergraduate education at Harvard College encompassed history and forestry as well as pre-medical courses. He graduated with a B.A. with honors in 1908 and went on to Harvard Medical School, from which he received his M.D. in 1911.

He then began his long association with the Massachusetts General Hospital through an internship in pediatrics and internal medicine. During that time he co-authored his first scientific paper, on the coagulation of blood, with Roger I. Lee. The Lee-White coagulation time is still used today as a method of measuring the speed of blood coagulation. In 1913, White was offered a Harvard traveling fellowship to study cardiovascular physiology with the eminent cardiologist, Thomas Lewis, in London. This experience, perhaps coupled with the earlier death of his sister from rheumatic heart disease and his father's death from coronary artery disease at age seventy-one, was to shape the rest of his medical career.

== World War I ==
In World War I, White served as a medical officer with the British Expeditionary Force in 1916 and the American Expeditionary Force from 1917 to 1919. He returned to the Massachusetts General Hospital and worked as a resident in 1919, and a year later became Chief of the Medical Out-Patient Department.

== Academic career ==
White was appointed to the Harvard faculty as a clinical instructor in 1921 and quickly rose through the academic ranks to become assistant professor in 1933, clinical professor in 1946, and emeritus professor in 1949. He continued on the faculty of Harvard until 1956, although he had resigned his position as Chief of the Cardiac Service at the Massachusetts General Hospital in 1948 to devote time to the development of the National Heart Institute, following adoption of the National Heart Act, which was signed into law by President Truman in 1948.

White was recognized as a superb teacher and compassionate bedside physician. He published twelve books and more than 700 scientific articles. His most noted textbook, Heart Disease, was first published in 1931 and became a classic in the field. His interest in the electrophysiology of the heart would eventually pair him with Drs. Louis Wolff and John Parkinson, who together described the Wolff-Parkinson-White syndrome, a condition of uncontrolled rapid heartbeat. In 1935 he described the electrocardiographic changes of pulmonary embolism.

=== Advocacy work ===
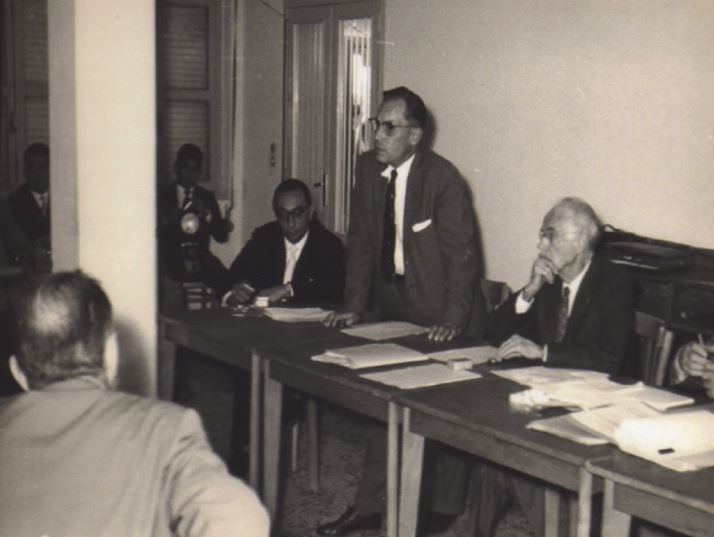
Ancel Keys (standing) with Paul Dudley White (right)

White is viewed by most medical authorities as the founder of preventive cardiology. Appointed as President Dwight D. Eisenhower's physician following his heart attack in 1955, White very publicly prescribed cycling for his famous patient, giving the bicycle industry a welcome boost. White was a staunch advocate of exercise, diet, and weight control in the prevention of heart disease. In 1924, he was one of the founders of the American Heart Association and became the organization's president in 1941. In the 1950s, White collaborated with Ancel Keys in developing the diet-heart hypothesis. White authored the Foreword to Ancel Keys's 1959 book Eat Well and Stay Well.

He was a moving force in the creation of the International Association of Cardiology, and later the International Cardiology Foundation. In 1949, he was named executive director of the National Advisory Heart Council. He was the chief consultant to the National Heart Institute from 1948 to 1955 and was a major impetus in the Framingham Heart Study, which was the first major epidemiologic work to identify risk factors in coronary artery disease. He was influential in establishing the National Institutes of Health.

White received many international honors and was instrumental in establishing cardiology organizations throughout the world, even in the People's Republic of China which he was one of the first American physicians to visit. He also established a connection with Alexander Filipovich Samoilov, a Soviet physiologist who shared White's interest in the electrophysiology of the heart. White was one of the founders of the International Society of Cardiology in 1946, helped to organize its first World Congress of Cardiology four years later in Paris, and presided over the second World Congress in Washington in 1954.

White was a staunch advocate of the belief that lifestyle affected coronary artery disease. He was one of the first authorities to recognize that coronary artery disease could occur in young men, writing several papers on the subject. In keeping with his beliefs, he was a vigorous walker and bicycle rider and walked, on one occasion, from Washington National Airport to the White House to consult with President Eisenhower. Reportedly, his positive approach inspired Lyndon B. Johnson to return to the Senate in 1955 after his heart attack and later to become Vice President.

In his later years, White continued to travel and to speak about heart disease and, increasingly, about his concern for world peace.

== Awards ==
White was elected an Associate Fellow of the National Academy of Kinesiology (née American Academy of Physical Education) in 1961, and delivered the academy's R. Tait McKenzie Memorial Lecture the year before at their 1960 meeting in Miami Beach, Florida. His presentation was titled, "Health and Sickness in Middle Age". Also in 1961, NYU awarded White the prestigious University Medal. Three years later, on September 14, 1964, President Johnson presented White with the Presidential Medal of Freedom.

== Personal life ==
On June 28, 1924, White married Ina Helen Reid, a social worker whom he met while giving a lecture at the Smith College Training School for Social Work. They later adopted two children. White spent many summers at Camp Becket in Becket, MA, where the dining hall is named after him.

== Death and memorials ==
White died in Boston following a second stroke. He was to have received the Herrick Award from the American Heart Association, but died before that honor could be bestowed. A memorial service was held in the Harvard Memorial Church the next month; there, J. Willis Hurst, M.D., a former student of White, delivered a eulogy entitled "I'm Not Through Yet".

The United States Postal Service honored White with a 3¢ Great Americans series postage stamp on September 15, 1986. A 17-mile section of the Charles River Bike Path around the Charles River in Boston bears his name.
