= Campbell's theorem =

Campbell's theorem may refer to:

- Campbell's theorem (geometry), which concerns the embedding of Riemannian manifolds and is named after J. E. Campbell.
- Campbell's theorem (probability), which concerns the expected value of a function of a point process and is named after N. R. Campbell.
