= Gaoyi railway station =

Railway station in Gaoyi County, Shijiazhuang, Hebei, China

Gaoyi 高邑

General information
- Location: 44 Gaoyi Dajie; Gaoyi County, Shijiazhuang, Hebei; China
- Coordinates: 37°36′16″N 114°35′29.70″E
- Operator: CR Beijing
- Line: Beijing–Guangzhou railway
- Distance: Beijing–Guangzhou railway: 318 kilometres (198 mi) from Beijing West; 1,978 kilometres (1,229 mi) from Guangzhou
- Platforms: 3 (1 side platform and 1 island platform)
- Tracks: 5

Other information
- Station code: 20477 (TMIS code); GIP (telegraph code); GYI (Pinyin code)
- Classification: Class 3 station (三等站)

History
- Opened: 1903

Services
Preceding station	China Railway	Following station
Yuanshi towards Beijing West	Beijing–Guangzhou railway	Lincheng towards Guangzhou
Location
- Location within Hebei Location within China

Gaoyi railway station (Chinese: 高邑站) is a station on Beijing–Guangzhou railway in Gaoyi County, Shijiazhuang, Hebei.

== History ==
The station was opened in 1903.

== See also ==
- Gaoyi West railway station
