= Tangyin railway station =

Railway station in Anyang, China

Tangyin 汤阴
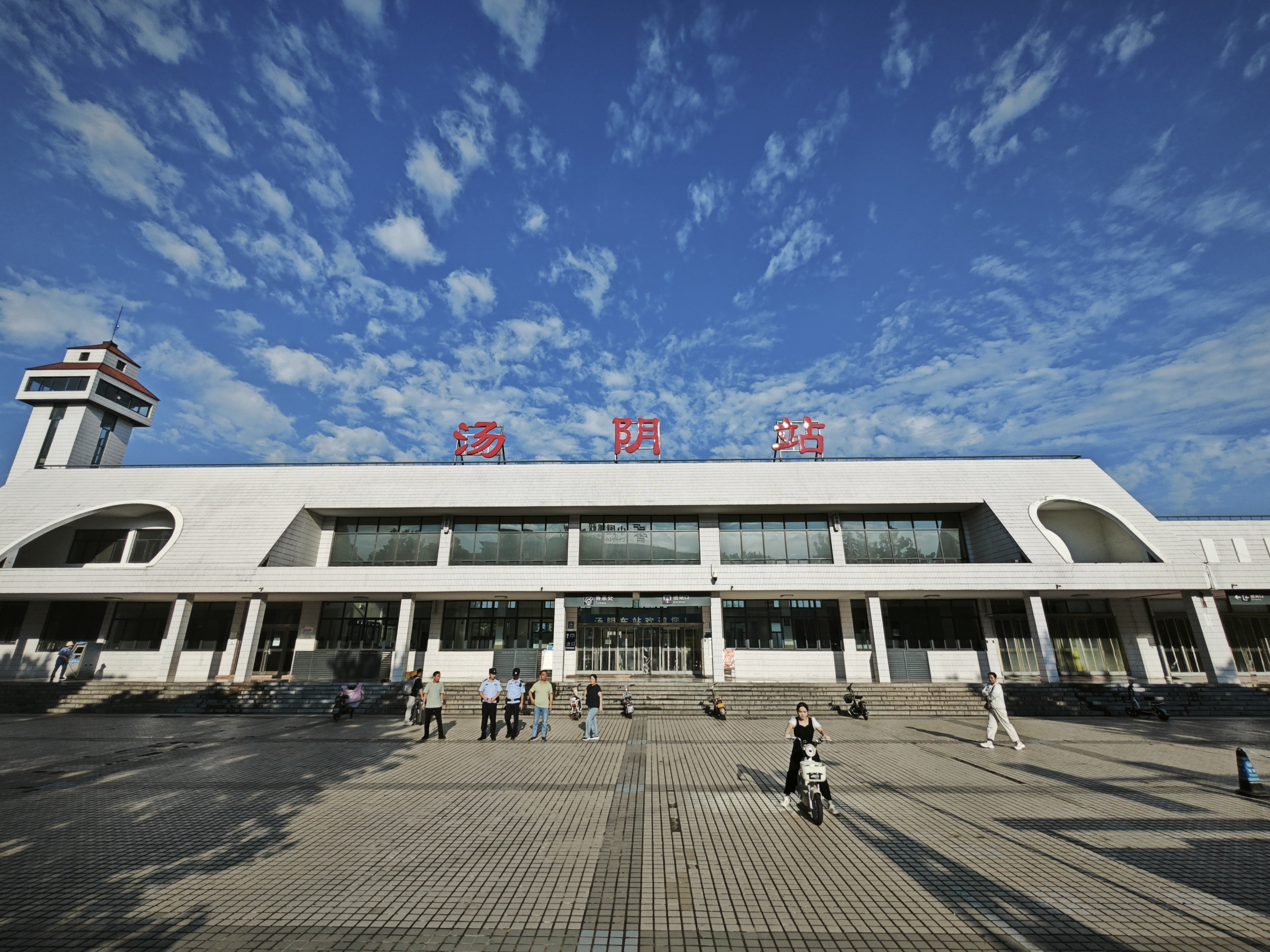
- Tangyin railway station

General information
- Location: Tiedong Road; Tangyin County, Anyang, Henan; China
- Coordinates: 35°54′52.61″N 114°20′45.67″E
- Operator: CR Zhengzhou
- Line: Beijing–Guangzhou railway
- Distance: Beijing–Guangzhou railway: 505 kilometres (314 mi) from Beijing West; 1,791 kilometres (1,113 mi) from Guangzhou
- Platforms: 3 (1 side platform and 1 island platform)
- Tracks: 11

Other information
- Station code: 20588 (TMIS code); TYF (telegraph code); TYI (Pinyin code)
- Classification: Class 2 station (二等站)

History
- Opened: 1904

Services
Preceding station	China Railway	Following station
Anyang towards Beijing West	Beijing–Guangzhou railway	Hebi towards Guangzhou
Location
- Location within Henan Location within China

Tangyin railway station (Chinese: 汤阴站) is a station on Beijing–Guangzhou railway in Tangyin County, Anyang, Henan.

There is a stone tablet carved in 1942 on Platform 1 indicating the hometown of Yue Fei.

== History ==
The station was opened in 1904.
