= Shaheshi railway station =

Railway station in Xingtai, China

Shaheshi 沙河市
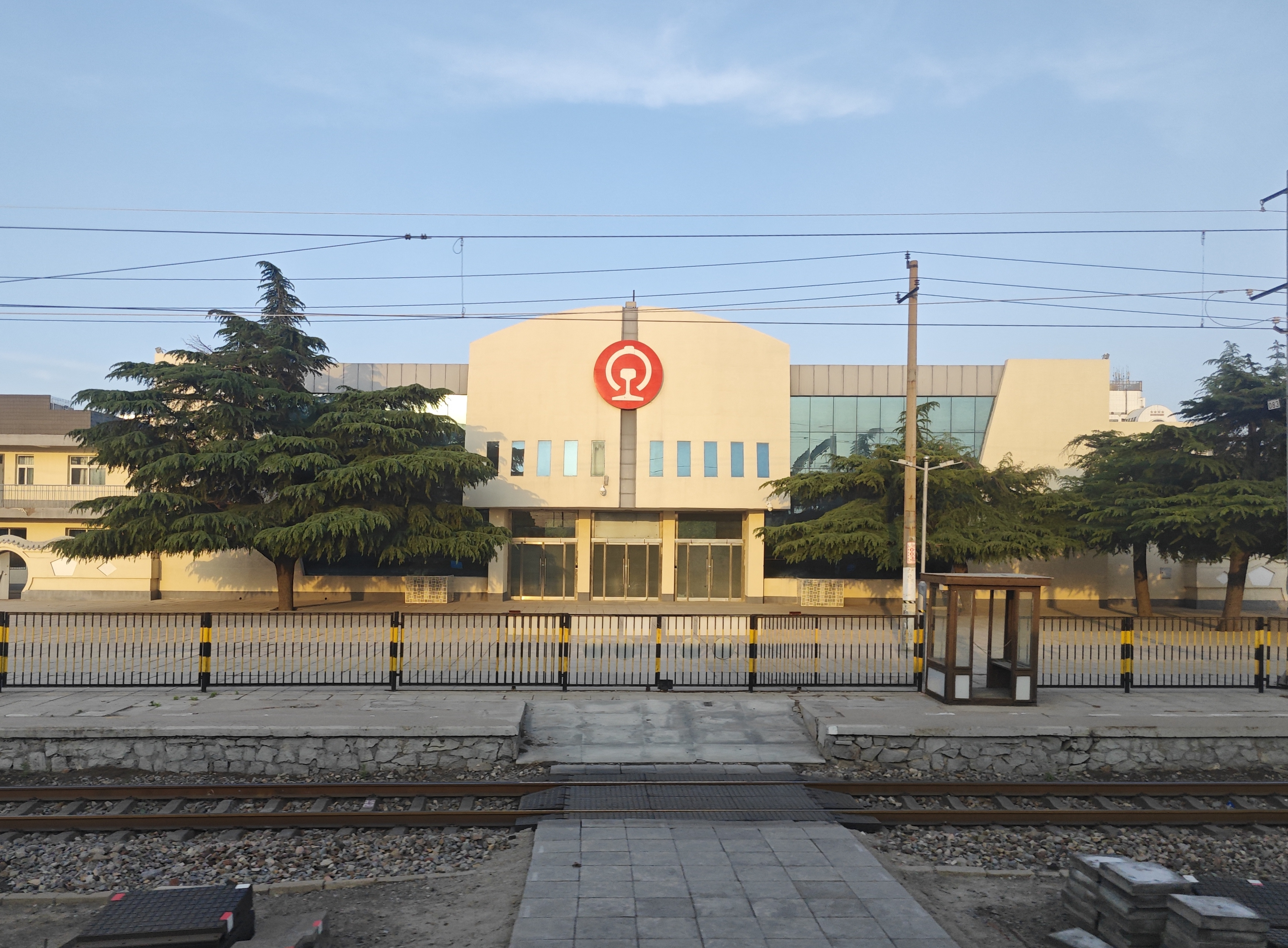

General information
- Location: 12 Baiyun Road; Shahe, Xingtai, Hebei; China
- Coordinates: 36°51′40″N 114°29′50″E
- Operator: CR Beijing
- Line: Beijing–Guangzhou railway
- Distance: Beijing–Guangzhou railway: 400 kilometres (250 mi) from Beijing West; 1,896 kilometres (1,178 mi) from Guangzhou
- Platforms: 3 (1 side platform and 1 island platform)
- Tracks: 10
- Connections: Bus terminal

Other information
- Station code: 20510 (TMIS code); VOP (telegraph code); SHS (Pinyin code)
- Classification: Class 2 station (二等站)

History
- Opened: 1912
- Former names: Dalian (Chinese: 褡裢)

Services
Preceding station	China Railway	Following station
Xingtai towards Beijing West	Beijing–Guangzhou railway	Handan towards Guangzhou
Location
- Location within Hebei Location within China

Shaheshi railway station (Chinese: 沙河市站, literally "Shahe City railway station") is a station on Beijing–Guangzhou railway in Shahe, Xingtai, Hebei.

== History ==
The station was opened in 1912.
