= Xingtai railway station =

Railway station in Qiaodong District, Xingtai, Hebei, China

Xingtai 邢台
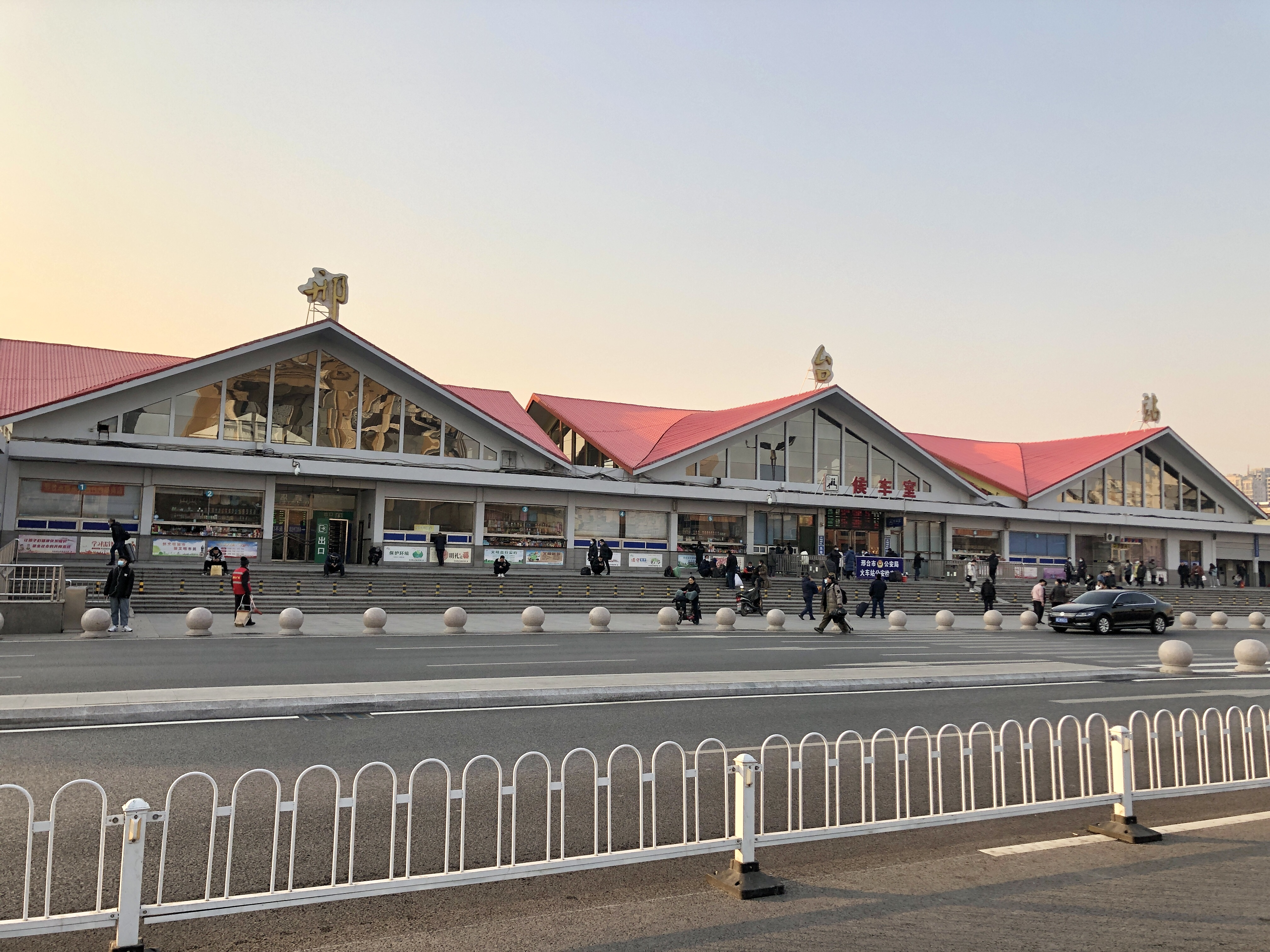
- Xingtai railway station

General information
- Location: 20 Chezhan N. Road; Xiangdu District, Xingtai, Hebei; China
- Coordinates: 37°04′08″N 114°29′10″E
- Operator: CR Beijing
- Line: Beijing–Guangzhou railway
- Distance: Beijing–Guangzhou railway: 377 kilometres (234 mi) from Beijing West; 1,919 kilometres (1,192 mi) from Guangzhou
- Platforms: 3 (1 side platform and 1 island platform)
- Tracks: 14
- Connections: Bus terminal

Other information
- Station code: 20495 (TMIS code); XTP (telegraph code); XTA (Pinyin code)
- Classification: Class 1 station (一等站)

History
- Opened: 1903
- Former names: Shunde Fu (Chinese: 顺德府)

Services
Preceding station	China Railway	Following station
Lincheng towards Beijing West	Beijing–Guangzhou railway	Shaheshi towards Guangzhou
Location
- Location within Hebei Location within China

Xingtai railway station (Chinese: 邢台站) is a station on Beijing–Guangzhou railway in Xingtai, Hebei.

== History ==
The station was opened in 1903 as Shunde Fu railway station (Chinese: 顺德府车站) .
