= Catherine Otto =

American physician

- Born: May 28, 1953 (age 73)
- Citizenship: American
- Education: Reed College (BA, 1975); University of Washington (MD, 1979)
- Medical career
- Field: Cardiologist
- Institutions: University of Washington
- Sub-specialties: Echocardiography
- Research: Calcific aortic stenosis
- Website: Official website

Catherine Mary Otto is an American physician, specializing in echocardiography. Otto serves as J. Ward Kennedy-Hamilton Endowed Chair in Cardiology at the University of Washington Medical Center, where she completed her fellowship. As a cardiologist, she has authored multiple echocardiography textbooks. Otto has focused her career in the fields of valvular heart disease, adult congenital heart disease, and echocardiography.

== Education ==
Catherine Otto obtained a B.A. from Reed College in 1975, and then an M.D. from the University of Washington in 1979. She completed her residency at The New York Hospital-Cornell Medical Center from 1979 to 1982 in internal medicine, and then she took a fellowship in cardiology at the University of Washington from 1982 to 1985.

== Career ==
Otto is an expert on calcific aortic stenosis and received the 2011 American College of Cardiology Distinguished Scientist Award (Clinical Domain) for her research on this subject. In 2024 Otto assisted in a review study over calcific aortic stenosis, concluding that upon diagnosis of aortic stenosis by echocardiography, there are two major forms of treatment. Both surgical aortic valve replacement and transcatheter aortic valve implantation have proven to extend the patients life, however, which intervention is chosen should be based on multiple resources, including a heart valve team.

In January, 2014, she was appointed editor-in-chief of Heart, the official journal of the British Cardiovascular Society.

During 2023, Otto was awarded by the American College of Cardiology with the Distinguished Teacher Award for her impact within the cardiology field.

Catherine Otto also specializes in treating a variety of conditions including, but not limited to heart failure, hypertension, and coronary artery disease.

== Personal ==
On 29 March 1979, Otto married Robert Frederick Leach in King County, Washington.

== Selected publications ==
- C. Otto and B. Bonow. Valvular Heart Disease, 3rd ed, Elsevier/Saunders, 2009
- C. Otto. Textbook of Clinical Echocardiography, 4th ed, Elsevier, 2009
- D. Oxorn and C. Otto. Atlas of Intraoperative Transesophageal Echocardiography: Surgical and Radiologic Correlations, Elsevier, 2006
- C. Otto. The Practice of Clinical Echocardiography, 3rd edition. Elsevier, 2008
- C. Otto, B. Schwaegler and R. Freeman Echocardiography Review Guide, 2nd ed., Elsevier, 2011
- C. Otto and L. Gillam. 'Advanced Echocardiographic Approaches', Elsevier, 2012
