= Yuanshi railway station =

Railway station in Yuanshi County, Shijiazhuang, Hebei, China

Yuanshi 元氏
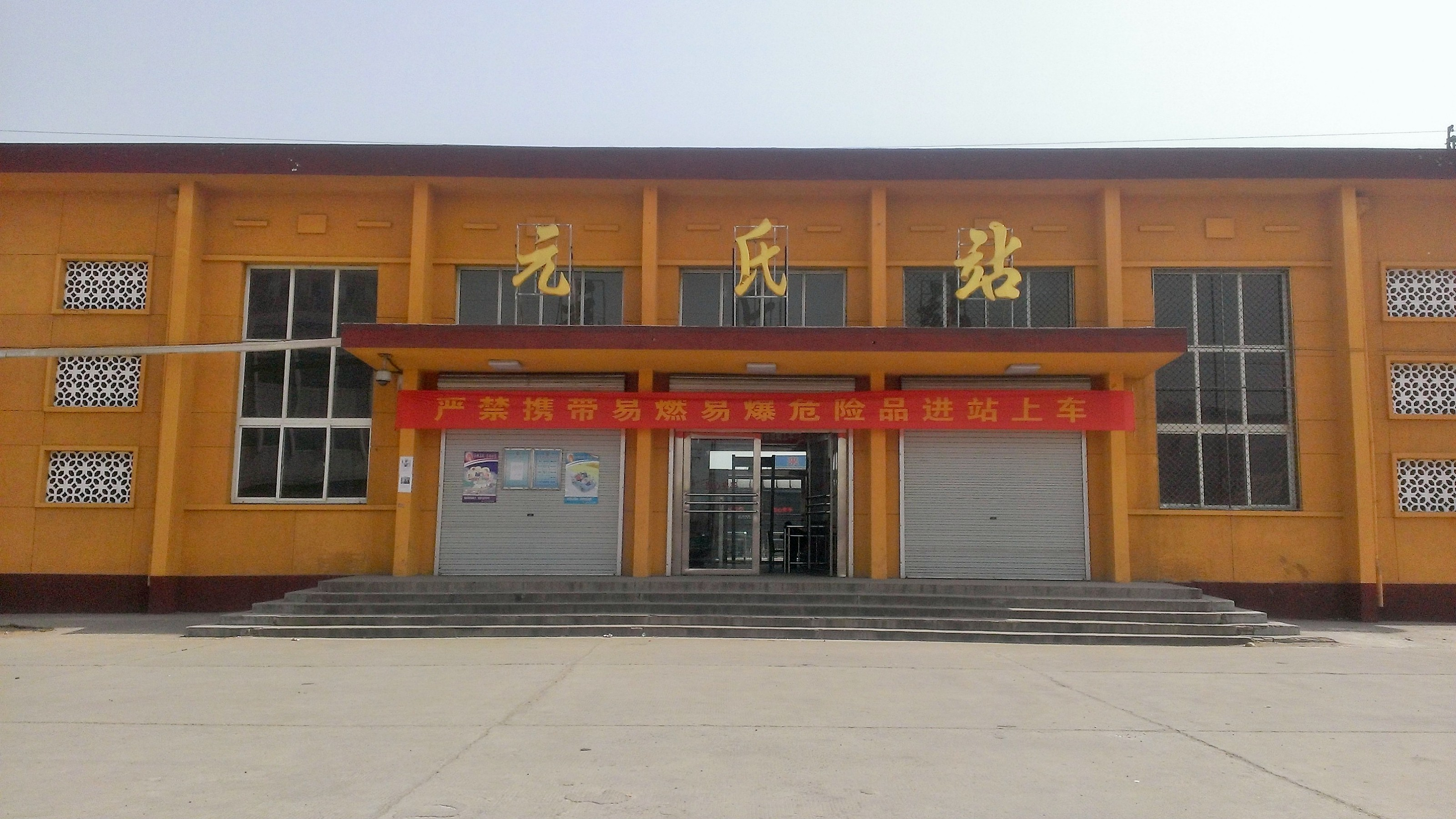

General information
- Location: Shengli Street; Yuanshi County, Shijiazhuang, Hebei; China
- Coordinates: 37°45′41″N 114°32′18.3″E
- Operator: CR Beijing
- Line: Beijing–Guangzhou railway
- Distance: Beijing–Guangzhou railway: 300 kilometres (190 mi) from Beijing West; 1,996 kilometres (1,240 mi) from Guangzhou
- Platforms: 3 (1 side platform and 1 island platform)
- Tracks: 4

Other information
- Station code: 20471 (TMIS code); YSP (telegraph code); YSH (Pinyin code)
- Classification: Class 3 station (三等站)

History
- Opened: 1903

Services
Preceding station	China Railway	Following station
Shijiazhuang towards Beijing West	Beijing–Guangzhou railway	Gaoyi towards Guangzhou
Location
- Location within Hebei Location within China

Yuanshi railway station (Chinese: 元氏站) is a station on Beijing–Guangzhou railway in Yuanshi County, Shijiazhuang, Hebei.

== History ==
The station was opened in 1903.
