= Hebi railway station =

Railway station in Hebi, China

Hebi 鹤壁
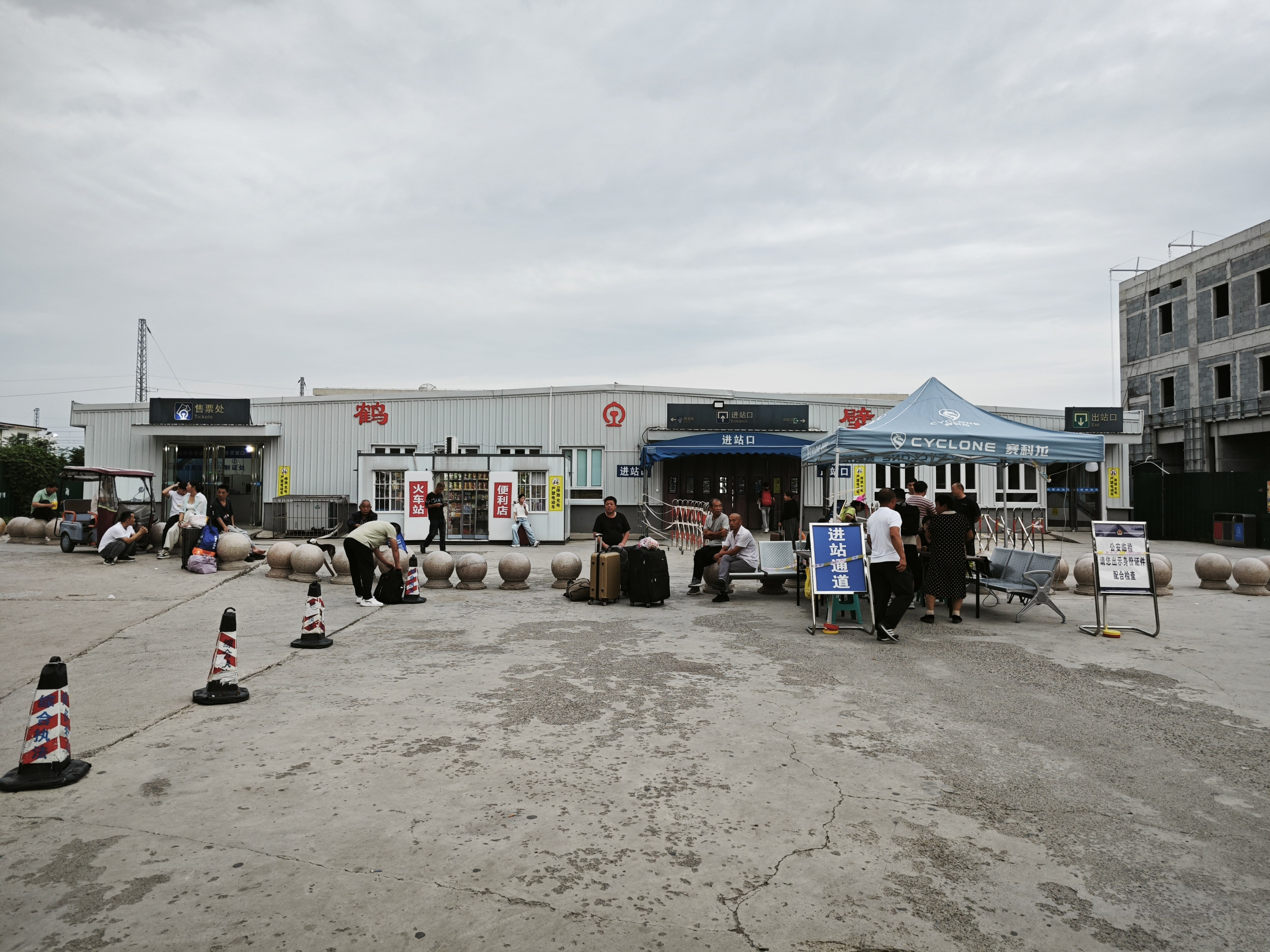
- Hebi railway station temporary building

General information
- Location: Western section of Liyang Road; Qibin District, Hebi, Henan; China
- Coordinates: 35.7599°N 114.2683°E
- Operator: CR Zhengzhou
- Line: Beijing–Guangzhou railway
- Distance: Beijing–Guangzhou railway: 523 kilometres (325 mi) from Beijing West; 1,773 kilometres (1,102 mi) from Guangzhou
- Platforms: 3 (1 side platform and 1 island platform)
- Tracks: 8

Other information
- Station code: 20594 (TMIS code); HAF (telegraph code); HBI (Pinyin code)
- Classification: Class 2 station (二等站)

History
- Opened: 1904
- Former names: Xunxian (Chinese: 浚县)

Services
Preceding station	China Railway	Following station
Tangyin towards Beijing West	Beijing–Guangzhou railway	Weihui towards Guangzhou
Location
- Location within Henan Location within China

Hebi railway station (Chinese: 鹤壁站) is a station on Beijing–Guangzhou railway in Qibin District, Hebi, Henan.

== History ==
The station was formerly known as Xunxian railway station (Chinese: 浚县站). It was changed to its current name in 1992 with the relocation of Hebi Prefecture People's Government.
