= Lincheng railway station =

Railway station in Lincheng District of Xingtai, Hebei Province, China

Lincheng 临城
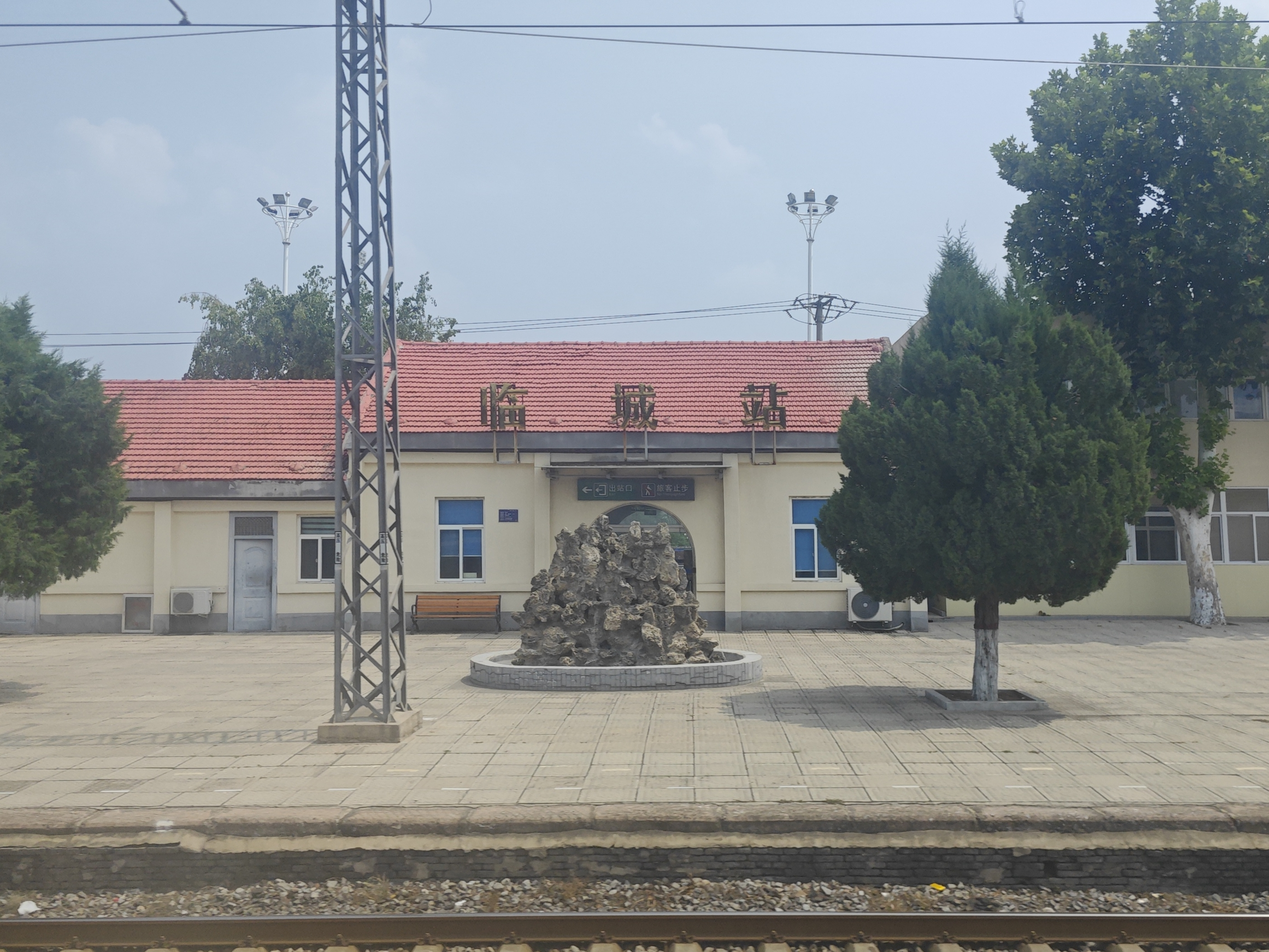

General information
- Location: 106 Zhennei Street; Lincheng County, Xingtai, Hebei; China
- Coordinates: 37°28′10″N 114°36′21″E
- Operator: CR Beijing
- Line: Beijing–Guangzhou railway
- Distance: Beijing–Guangzhou railway: 332 kilometres (206 mi) from Beijing West; 1,964 kilometres (1,220 mi) from Guangzhou
- Platforms: 3 (1 side platform and 1 island platform)
- Tracks: 5

Other information
- Station code: 20483 (TMIS code); UUP (telegraph code); LCH (Pinyin code)
- Classification: Class 3 station (三等站)

History
- Opened: 1903
- Former names: Zhennei (Chinese: 镇内)

Services
Preceding station	China Railway	Following station
Gaoyi towards Beijing West	Beijing–Guangzhou railway	Xingtai towards Guangzhou
Location
- Location within Hebei Location within China

Lincheng railway station (Chinese: 临城站) is a station on Beijing–Guangzhou railway in Lincheng County, Xingtai, Hebei.

== History ==
The station was opened in 1903.

From 28 June 2016, passenger train services at this station resumed.
