= John Edward Campbell =

Irish mathematician (1862–1924)

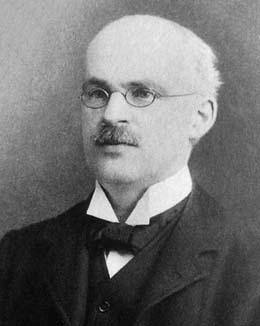
- Born: 27 May 1862; Lisburn, Ireland
- Died: 1 October 1924 (aged 62); Oxford, Oxfordshire, England
- Known for: Campbell's theorem Baker–Campbell–Hausdorff formula
- Awards: Fellow of the Royal Society (1905)
- Scientific career
- Fields: Mathematics

John Edward Campbell (27 May 1862, Lisburn, Ireland – 1 October 1924, Oxford, Oxfordshire, England) was a mathematician, best known for his contribution to the Baker-Campbell-Hausdorff formula.

== Biography ==
Campbell was born in a family of a doctor, also named John Campbell. He studied first at the Methodist College in Belfast and then at Queen's University Belfast, graduating in 1884. He then won a scholarship to study at the Oxford University, at Hertford College. There he won the Junior Mathematical University Scholarship in 1885, became a College Fellow in 1887, obtained a Senior Scholarship in 1888, and eventually became a tutor. Campbell was noted as a charming and highly devoted teacher and a proponent of women's education.

Campbell made his most notable contribution to mathematics in 1897 by introducing a formula for multiplication of exponentials in Lie algebras. This formula was later elaborated by Henri Poincaré (1899) and Henry Frederick Baker (1902). It was later systematised geometrically by Felix Hausdorff (1906) and became known as Baker-Campbell-Hausdorff formula.

In 1903, Campbell published a book on Introductory Treatise on Lie's Theory of Finite Continuous Transformation Groups where he popularised the ideas of Sophus Lie. He was elected a Fellow of the Royal Society in 1905, and served as president of the London Mathematical Society from 1918 to 1920. He was tutor to the future literary scholar C. S. Lewis in 1917, assisting Lewis with Responsions in mathematics as part of the entrance requirements for Oxford University. Campbell was the first mathematician from Oxford who was invited, shortly before his death, by the Cambridge University to examine the Cambridge Mathematical Tripos.

A memorial plaque for Campbell can be seen in St Ebbe's, Oxford.

== Personal life ==
Campbell married Sarah Hardman (born in Oldham ca. 1862) in the Ashton Registration District in the late 1889. They had three sons and one daughter, all born in Oxford:

- John Maurice Hardman Campbell (1891–1973)
- William Percy Campbell (2 May 1894 – 24 October 1914)
- Patrick James Campbell (22 December 1897 – )
- Dorothea Mary Hardman Campbell (28 December 1902 – ?).

William enrolled into the Oxford College in October 1913 but went to the World War I fronts the next year. He fought with the Wiltshire Regiment as a Second Lieutenant in the 3rd Battalion (attached 2nd Battalion) starting from October 1914 and was killed in action only a few weeks later. He was the uncle of Air Chief Marshal Sir Donald Hardman.

== Books ==
- Introductory treatise on Lie's theory of continuous transformation groups. Oxford: Clarendon Press. 1903.
- A course of differential geometry. Oxford: Clarendon Press. 1924.
