= British Cardiovascular Society =

British cardiology organization

Coordinates: 51°31′24.8″N 0°8′23.0″W

The British Cardiovascular Society (BCS) is a United Kingdom-wide health organisation based in London. It aims to represent all healthcare professionals working in the field of cardiology, set standards for prevention, diagnosis, and clinical care, and communicate those standards to the community and the patients through training, education and public outreach.

== History ==
The first idea for the BCS came in 1910 by the Scottish cardiologist Sir James Mackenzie. At an Association of Physicians meeting in Oxford on 22 April 1922, the Cardiac Club was formed by 5 cardiologists: Carey F. Coombs, T. F. Cotton, John Cowan, A. G. Gibson (as chair), and W. E. Hume. It was founded in 1922 at the Club's first active meeting by 15 founder members — the original five plus ten others, including Thomas J. Horder and Thomas Lewis — and with one honorary member, namely Mackenzie. In April 1937 it became the Cardiac Society of Great Britain and Ireland. In 1946 it became the British Cardiac Society.

It was incorporated (03005604) on 1 January 1995 as the British Cardiac Society. It became the British Cardiovascular Society on 8 May 2006.

== Function ==
It produces the Heart journal; this was established in 1939 as the British Heart Journal. The Editor is Catherine Otto. Another journal it produces is called Open Heart.

== Structure ==
It is situated in Fitzrovia in the London Borough of Camden. It became a UK Registered Charity in 2002. Its membership (2,500) included doctors and nurses. It is an affiliate of the European Society of Cardiology. The current President of the Society for the 2018–2021 term is Simon Ray, Honorary Professor of Cardiology of Manchester University.
