= Weihui railway station =

Railway station in Weihui, Henan, China

Weihui 卫辉
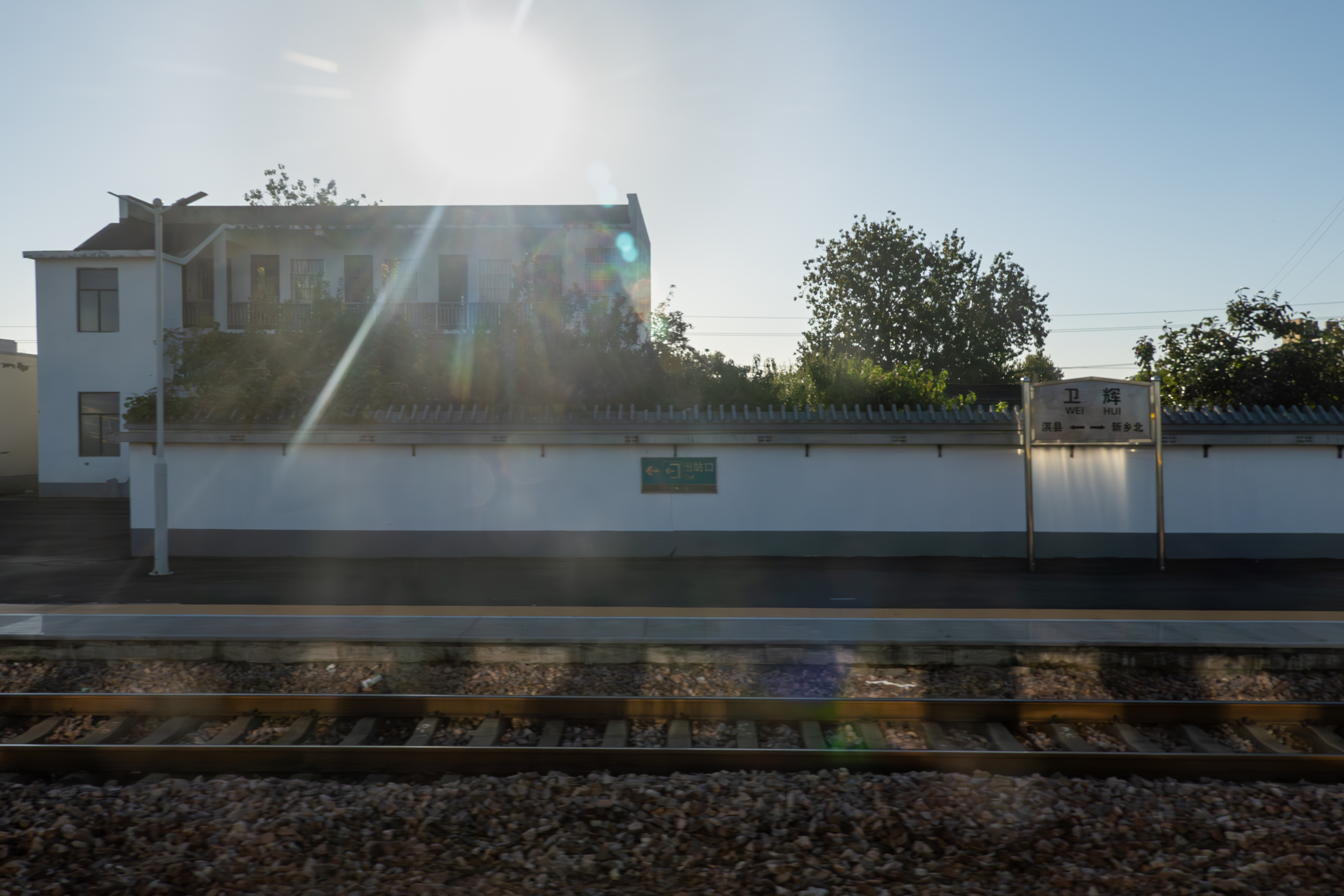

General information
- Location: 138 Xiangyu Avenue; Weihui, Xinxiang, Henan; China
- Coordinates: 35°25′55.95″N 114°3′43.26″E
- Operator: CR Zhengzhou
- Line: Beijing–Guangzhou railway
- Distance: Beijing–Guangzhou railway: 564 kilometres (350 mi) from Beijing West; 1,732 kilometres (1,076 mi) from Guangzhou
- Platforms: 3 (1 side platform and 1 island platform)
- Tracks: 5

Other information
- Station code: 20606 (TMIS code); WHF (telegraph code); WHU (Pinyin code)
- Classification: Class 3 station (三等站)

History
- Opened: 1904

Services
Preceding station	China Railway	Following station
Hebi towards Beijing West	Beijing–Guangzhou railway	Xinxiang towards Guangzhou
Location
- Location within Henan Location within China

Weihui railway station (Chinese: 卫辉站) is a station on the Beijing–Guangzhou railway in Weihui, Xinxiang, Henan.

== History ==
The station was established in 1904.

== See also ==
- Weihui South railway station
