= Open Heart (journal) =

- Discipline: Cardiology
- Language: English
- Edited by: Ganesan Karthikeyan

Publication details
- History: 2014-present
- Publisher: BMJ Group
- Frequency: continuous
- Open access: Open access journal
- Impact factor: 3.1 (2025)

Standard abbreviations
- ISO 4: Open Heart

Indexing
- ISSN: 2053-3624

Links
- Journal homepage; Online access; Online archive

Open Heart is an online only, continuously published, peer-reviewed open access medical journal covering all areas of cardiovascular medicine and surgery. The journal is an official journal of the British Cardiovascular Society.

The editor-in-chief is Dr Pascal Meier, Royal Brompton Hospital (UK) and University of Geneva (Switzerland)

== Abstracting and Indexing ==
The journal is abstracted and indexed by PubMed Central, Scopus, Google Scholar, and the Emerging Sources Citation Index.
