= Handan–Changzhi railway =

Railway line in China

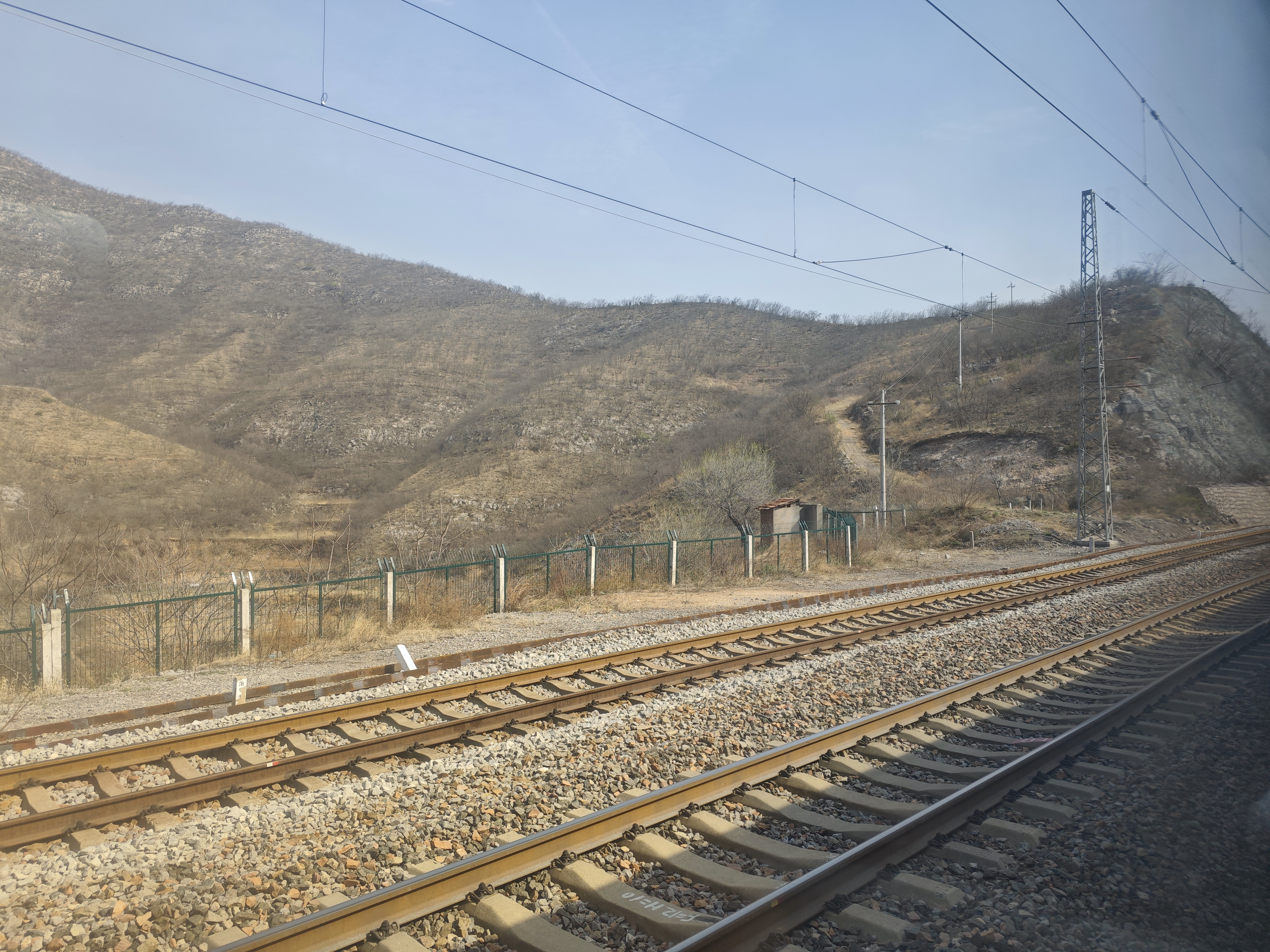
Xinwan Station, near the Taihang Mountains

The Handan–Changzhi railway or Hanchang railway (simplified Chinese: 邯长铁路; traditional Chinese: 邯長鐵路; pinyin: háncháng tiělù), is a major railroad in northern China for the transportation of coal. The railway is named after its terminal cities, Handan in Hebei Province and Changzhi in Shanxi Province. The line is 221.7 km (138 mi) in length and was built from 1971 to 1983.

== Route ==
The Handan–Changzhi railway traverses the Taihang Mountains and has 19 tunnels. The line is used to carry coal from Shanxi to eastern China and for export overseas via ports in Shandong. The original carrying capacity of the line was raised from 13.9 million tons to 19 million in 1998 and again to 35 million tons in 2007.

== Rail connections ==
- Changzhi: Taiyuan–Jiaozuo railway, Shanxi–Henan–Shandong railway
- Handan: Beijing–Guangzhou railway, Handan–Jinan railway

== See also ==
- List of railways in China
