= Charles Laubry =

French cardiologist

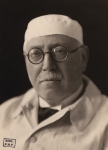
Charles Laubry, collection Bibliothèque interuniversitaire de santé.

Charles Laubry (born 11 November 1872 in Saint-Florentin, Yonne, France; died 11 August 1960 in Flogny, Yonne, France) was a French cardiologist best known for his work on congenital heart disease and the significance of blood pressure in cardiovascular disease. He founded the French Society of Cardiology (Société française de cardiologie) in 1937, and served as its first president. In 1950 he presided over the first World Congress of Cardiology, held in Paris. He was elected to membership in the Academy of Sciences of the Institut de France.
