= Molly Cotton =

British archaeologist (1902–1984)

Mary Aylwin Cotton OBE, FSA, Hon FBA (née Marshall; 1902–1984), known as Molly Cotton, was a British archaeologist and former doctor, noted for her work in Iron Age Britain - particularly hill forts - and Roman Italy. She trained archaeology students at the British School at Rome.

In 1946, Cotton received an OBE for outstanding contributions to the war effort. In 1972, the Dr M. Aylwin Cotton Foundation was established to fund fellowships and publication grants for the study of archaeology.

She was married to Dr Thomas Forrest Cotton, a Canadian cardiologist.

== Early life ==
Mary Aylwin Marshall was born on 1 August 1902, on the Isle of Man. Her parents were Robert Marshall, a medical doctor, and Anna Elizabeth Marshall. She had a sister, Doris.

== Medical career ==
Molly Cotton was one of the first students to train at the London School of Medicine for Women, and St. Mary's Hospital. In 1928, she was working as a clinical assistant at the National Heart Hospital, where she met Thomas Forrest Cotton. The two married, and Molly retired from medicine. However, she remained honorary medical advisor to the National Children's Adoption Society until 1936.

== Archaeology career ==
In 1934, Molly Cotton began working on excavations at Maiden Castle, Dorset, with Tessa and Mortimer Wheeler. After Tessa's death in 1936, Cotton became deputy director of the site, alongside archaeologist Kitty Richardson.

In the same year, she was one of the first students to take the postgraduate diploma in archaeology at the recently founded Institute of Archaeology, London. She worked at Maiden Castle until 1938. She then undertook excavations on the defences of Calleva Atrebatum, the Roman settlement in Silchester, Hampshire from 1938 to 1939. Items from her excavation are now displayed at Reading Museum.

Cotton worked in the Foreign Office, and the Far Eastern Department of the Ministry of Economic Warfare during World War II. In 1945 she received an OBE for her contributions to the war effort.

After the war, Molly resumed archaeological work. In 1948, she worked at Hod Hill, Colchester. From 1949 until 1951, she again collaborated with Mortimer Wheeler, at Verulamium. 1951–1954, Cotton worked as Field Director at Clausentum. During this time, Cotton published numerous archaeological papers, focusing on Iron Age hill forts. In 1953, she undertook excavations at Weycock Hill. Between 1954 and 1958, Cotton administered the Silchester excavation, and a similar role in Verulamium between 1955 and 1961. In 1960, she excavated Robin Hood's Arbour, an Iron Age site in Maidenhead, Berkshire.

Her next projects were in Italy, excavating villas at Posto and San Rocco in Francolise, between 1962 and 1965. Here, she was directed by John Bryan Ward-Perkins and Peter von Blanckenhagen, "but essentially the project was hers". This excavation consisted of the first thorough study of Republican villas in Italy, and set a precedent for future research, using stratigraphy and historical sequence. The excavations at Posto and San Rocco (1962–65) were fully published.

== Move to Italy ==
After her husband's death in 1965, Cotton moved to Rome, where she lived in a flat on the Aventine. She became closely involved in the work of the British School at Rome, running the archaeological work room of the British School at Rome, known as the Camerone.

Cotton's next excavation was at the Villanovan cemetery of Quattro Fontanili at Veii. Further excavations followed, at Casale Pian Roseto, South Etruria, Gravina, Cozzo Presepe, and in 1970, Monte Irsi in Basilicata.

The Dr M. Alywin Cotton Foundation was established in 1972, in order to provide fellowships and publication grants to scholars in the fields of history, archaeology, Mediterranean art, architecture and language.

Cotton continued excavating in the 1970s, working in Tuscania in 1972–1973, and Otranto in 1977, where she converted a castle dungeon into her finds department.

Whilst her active excavating career slowed down in the 1980s, she still participated in archaeological works, completing her notes on past excavations and attending events. In 1980 she became an Honorary Fellow of the British Academy. In 1981, she was a Senior statesman at a Siena Congress, and attended a gathering of archaeologists in Italy, in Cambridge,in January 1984.

Molly Cotton died in Rome on 31 May 1984, and was buried in the city's Protestant Cemetery.

== Personality ==
Molly Cotton was fondly described by friends and colleagues. Referring to Cotton's work at Maiden Castle with Tessa and Mortimer Wheeler, archaeologist Jacquetta Hawkes described her as "perhaps the most fully mature human being in the Wheeler's archaeological circle." Cotton "worked closely with both Wheelers and was fond of both", and actually informed Mortimer of his wife's death, waiting to intercept his train upon his return from France to ensure he heard the news before returning to London. Mortimer noted that "at Victoria I was met by Molly Cotton, a treasured friend and colleague of ours. For two days and nights she had met every continental train, not knowing which would be mine...in case I didn't know".

In her obituary, written by archaeologist Timothy W. Potter, Cotton was described as having a "happy and invigorating personality...Molly was always busy, cheerful and amazingly full of energy - and always helpful towards the young, not least the School's artists", referring to her work in the British School at Rome.

== Publications ==
- Cotton, M. 1947. Excavations at Silchester 1938–9. Archaeologia 92: 121–167.
- Cotton, M. 1979. The Late Republican Villa at Posto Francolise. London: British School at Rome.
- Cotton, M. and Gathercole, P. 1958. Excavations at Clausentum, Southampton, 1951–1954. London: H.M. Stationery Office.
- Cotton, M. and Métraux, G. 1985. The San Rocco villa at Francolise. London: British School at Rome.
- Wheeler, M., Richardson, K. and Cotton, M. 1957. Hill-forts of Northern France. Oxford: Printed at the University Press by Charles Batey for the Society of Antiquaries, London

== List of excavations ==
- 1934-1938 - Maiden Castle, Dorset
- 1938-1939 - Calleva Atrebatum, Silchester
- 1948 - Hod Hill, Colchester
- 1949-1951 - Verulamium
- 1951-1954 - Clausentum
- 1953 - Weycock Hill
- 1954-1958 - undertook administration for Silchester site
- 1955-1961 - undertook administration for Verulamium site
- 1967 - Robin Hood's Arbour
- 1962-1965 - Posto and San Rocco, Francolise
- Villanovan cemetery of Quattro Fontanili at Veii.
- Casale Pian Roseto
- South Etruria
- Gravina
- Cozzo Presepe
- 1970 - Monte Irsi, Basilicata
- 1972 -1973 - Tuscania
- 1977 - Otranto
