= Marcus Seymour Pembrey =

British physiologist

Marcus Pembrey

Marcus Seymour Pembrey FRS, (1868 – 23 July 1934) was a British physiologist who held important posts in several British hospitals and other organisations. He was also the author of several well known medical books. Although he worked primarily as a lecturer in physiology he spent time in the laboratory of Walther Flemming at Kiel in Germany, where pioneer work in cytological technique was going on, and then at Würzburg where he carried out research under Adolf Eugen Fick and Eduard von Rindfleisch. In Oxford, where he then worked as a demonstrator in physiology, he collaborated with Professor J.S. Haldane in determining the composition of air. He was elected a Fellow of the Royal Society, (FRS) in 1922. Many of his hundreds of old students from Guy's Hospital went on to become eminent physicians, surgeons, clinical chemists, haematologists and gynaecologists of their day. For some 30 years until his retirement in 1933, he was chairman and Treasurer of the Guy's Hospital Physiological Debating Society.

== Biography ==
Marcus Seymour Pembrey was born in 1868 at 164 Walton Street, Oxford where his father John Cripps Pembrey Jnr, a distinguished Oriental scholar, was reader and textual editor for the Oxford University Press. From Oxford High School, he gained a science scholarship at Christ Church, Oxford at the age of 17, and in 1889 he obtained a 1st Class Honours degree in the newly established School of Physiology.

In 1892, he graduated from the University College Hospital in London with an MB in medicine and gained various university honours, including the Johnson and the Rolleston Memorial Prizes. He was also awarded the Radcliffe Travelling Fellowship where he spent some time in Flemming's laboratory at Kiel in Germany, where the pioneer work in cytological technique was still going on and at Wurzburg, Germany where he carried out research under Fick and Rindfleisch.

He returned to Oxford as Demonstrator of Physiology under Burdon-Sanderson, where he collaborated with Professor J.S. Haldane in determining the composition of the air. In 1895, he took up the Lectureship in Physiology at Charing Cross Hospital in London and gained his MD from Oxford.

He married Elizabeth Cicely Crake in 1895 at Jevington Church, near Eastbourne. She was the eldest daughter of the Reverend Edward Ebeneezer Crake and Elizabeth Tanner of the Old Rectory.

In 1900, he migrated to Guy's Hospital, London as Lecturer in Physiology, jointly with John W. Washbourn and later with Ernest Starling. He succeeded Professor Starling and became sole Lecturer and in 1920, the post was converted into a London University Professorship. He was the author of a number of papers, published mainly in the Journal of Physiology and the Proceedings of the Royal Society and Guy's Hospital Reports. He was joint author of several well- known medical books. In recognition of his own pioneering experimental work in human physiology, he was elected a Fellow of the Royal Society (FRS) in 1922.

Marcus Pembrey

For many years he was in great demand as a lecturer or as chairman of various debating societies, which had a practical medical interest, such as the Associations of Nurses, Midwives and School Inspectors, Sanitary Institutes and the Royal Army Medical Corps (RAMC). A provocative raciness and a facility with quip and proverb made him the ideal inciter of controversy and the records of these associations are a mine of his sayings, which Old Guy's Men will at once recognise as 'Pembreyisms'. For example; " Fasting does not make one more spiritual but compels the victim to live upon his own flesh – to become a cannibal"; " The petty pilfering of orchards by children should be regarded as a sign, not of original sin but of an imperative demand for vitamins" and " The toilet of the human breast is to be condemned as a fad – the infant desires the taste of its mothers milk and skin, not of scented soap, eau de cologne or tannic acid". These 'Pembreyisms' were all quoted from the record of just one meeting!

Marcus Seymour served with distinction on the War Office Committee for the Physiological Effects of Food, Training and Clothing on the Soldier and took an active part in experimental marches with the troops.. One of his most famous quotes stated "The human or horse works best when well fed, and feeds best when well worked". He carried out important work as adviser to the Army Medical Service where he recommended that "The short man, in nearly every respect, made a better soldier than his taller comrades". He was also an advocate of early marriages and during a speech in Sheffield during 1923 he stated: "The greatest service a woman can do is marry early – and if I were in America, I should say marry early and often!"

Many of his hundreds of old students from Guy's Hospital went on to become eminent physicians, surgeons, clinical chemists, haematologists and gynaecologists of their day. For some 30 years until his retirement in 1933, he was chairman and Treasurer of the Guy's Hospital Physiological Debating Society. Apparently, in recognition for his superb influence and brilliant Physiological lecturing skills, he was offered the 'Freedom of the City of London' but modestly declined to accept the great honour due to his dislike of accolades.

Marcus and his artistic wife Cicely brought up ten children, most of whom went on to become either doctors, vets or nurses, as did a number of his grandchildren. He died of a pulmonary embolism aged 66 years.

== Works ==
- Textbook of General Pathology
