= Women in Housing and Finance =

Women in Housing and Finance (WHF) is a membership organization of professionals in the area of housing and finance located in the greater metropolitan area of New York City. It was founded in 1981.
