= Anyang railway station =

Railway station in Henan, China

Anyang 安阳
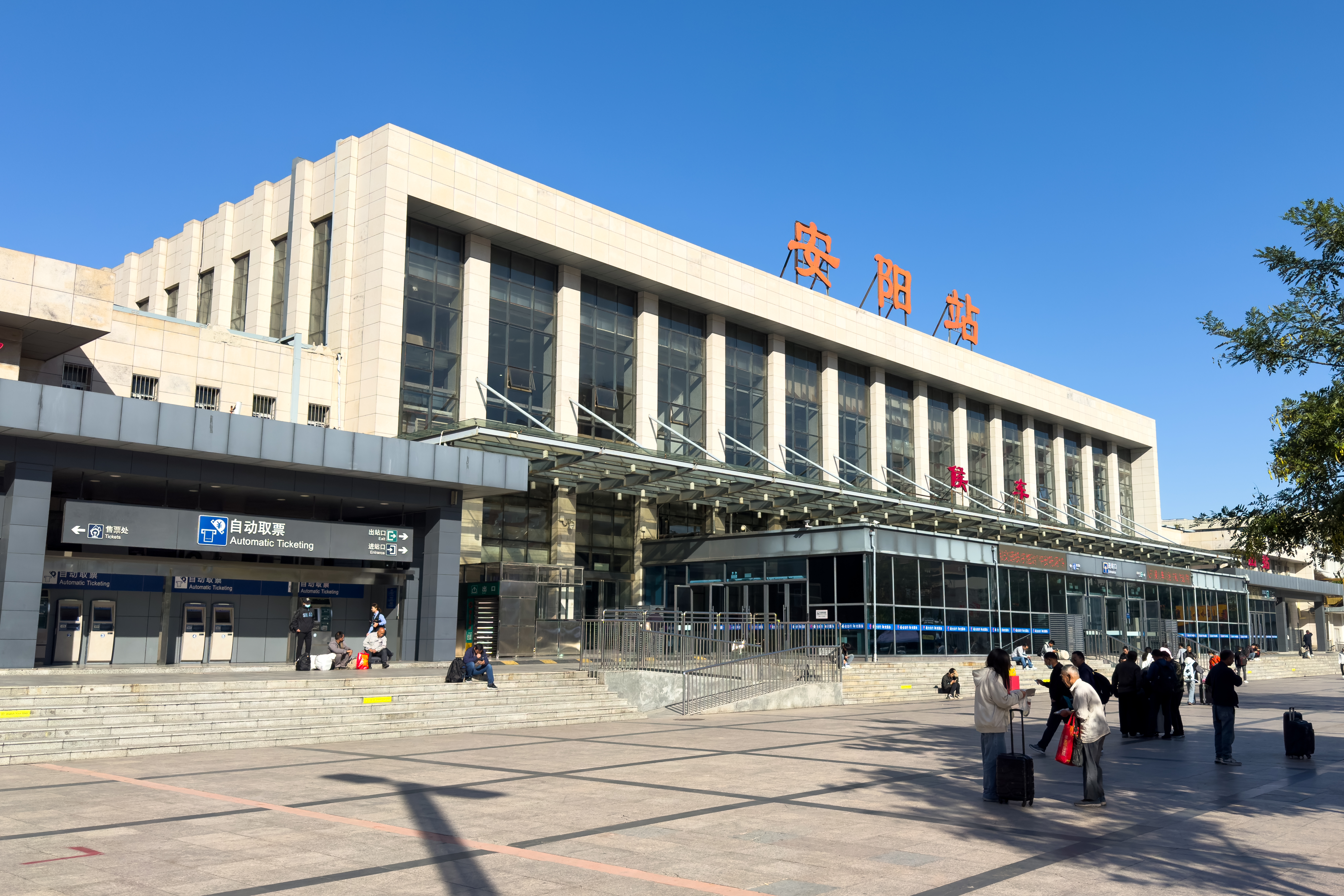

General information
- Location: 1 Jiefang Road; Beiguan District, Anyang, Henan; China
- Coordinates: 36°06′16.73″N 114°20′24.25″E
- Operator: CR Zhengzhou
- Line: Beijing–Guangzhou railway
- Distance: 485 km (301 mi) from Beijing West; 1,811 km (1,125 mi) from Guangzhou
- Platforms: 5 (1 side platform and 2 island platforms)
- Tracks: 14
- Connections: Bus terminal

Other information
- Station code: 20564 (TMIS code); AYF (telegraph code); AYA (Pinyin code)
- Classification: Class 1 station (一等站)

History
- Opened: 1904
- Former names: Zhangde (Chinese: 彰德)

Services
| Preceding station | China Railway | Following station |
|---|---|---|
| Handan towards Beijing West | Beijing–Guangzhou railway | Tangyin towards Guangzhou |
Location
- Location within Henan Location within China

Anyang railway station (Chinese: 安阳站) is a station on the Beijing–Guangzhou railway in Anyang, Henan. It is the northernmost station operated by CR Zhengzhou on the Beijing–Guangzhou railway.

== History ==
The station was opened in 1904.
