= Mary Woolley Gibbings Cotton, Viscountess Combermere =

Irish author

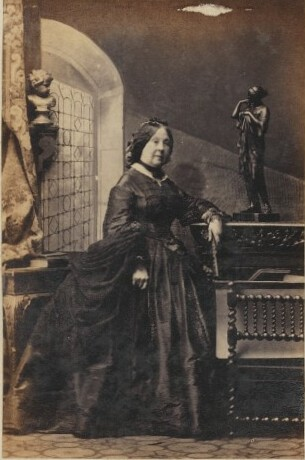
- Viscountess Combermere in 1862
- Born: 1799; Cork
- Died: 13 August 1889 (aged 89–90); Belgrave Square
- Occupation: Novelist, essayist, memoirist, poet
- Spouse(s): Stapleton Cotton, 1st Viscount Combermere

Mary Woolley Gibbings Cotton, Viscountess Combermere (1799 – 13 August 1889) was an Irish author.

Mary Woolley Gibbings Cotton, Viscountess Combermere was born in 1799 in Cork, the only daughter of Robert Gibbings, a wealthy Irish physician, and Barbara Woolley. In 1838, she became the third wife of Stapleton Cotton, 1st Viscount Combermere, 26 years her senior.

She turned to writing late in life, publishing an essay collection in 1863, Our Peculiarities. Her novel Shattered Idols featured a chemist engaging in poisoning and bigamy. She also wrote a volume of poetry and edited her late husband's memoirs.

Mary Woolley Gibbings Cotton, Viscountess Combermere died on 13 August 1889 in Belgrave Square.

== Bibliography ==
- Our Peculiarities (1863)
- Shattered Idols (1865)
- Memoirs and Correspondence of Field-Marshal Viscount Combermere (1866), editor
- A Friar's Scourge: Nonsense Verses (1876)
