= John Cripps Pembrey Jnr =

British orientalist (1831–1918)

John Cripps Pembrey Jnr (28 December 1831, Jericho, Oxford - 1 May 1918, Oxford) was a distinguished Oriental proof reader. He was apprentice to Thomas Combe and worked with his father John Cripps Pembrey Snr at Oxford University Press, setting up Sanskrit in type for publication, in 1849, of the first volumes of the Rig-Veda, one of the first printed Sanskrit books to become available to the Western world.

Later he became an expert proof reader of foreign language books and was responsible for most of the oriental books printed in Oxford. His skills were acknowledged in the prefaces of several scholarly books and he was awarded an Honorary Master of Arts (MA) degree by the University of Oxford in June 1902.

== Family ==
Cripps Pembrey Jnr was born in Oxford, son of John Cripps Pembrey Snr and Sophia Wells. He married Annie Coster Tanner in 1863 and they went on to have seven children, one of whom, Marcus Seymour Pembrey, became a notable lecturer and researcher in physiology and a Fellow of the Royal Society.
