= Thomas Forrest Cotton =

Canadian cardiologist

- Thomas Forrest Cotton by David Jagger, 1929. Oil on canvas, Royal College of Physicians, London.
- Born: 4 November 1884; Cowansville, Quebec, Canada
- Died: 26 July 1965 (aged 80)
- Education: McGill University
- Occupation: Cardiologist
- Known for: Introducing electrocardiography to Canada and England; Linking finger clubbing in adults with acquired structural heart disease and infective endocarditis

Thomas Forrest Cotton FRCP (4 November 1884 – 26 July 1965) was a Canadian cardiologist. He introduced electrocardiography to Canada and England and was the first to recognise the relationship between finger clubbing in adults with acquired structural heart disease and infective endocarditis. His paper on clubbing in endocarditis is considered by cardiologists as a classic.

== Early life and family ==
Thomas Cotton was born on 4 November 1884 in Cowansville, Quebec, to Cedric and Harriet C. Cotton. Cedric was a small-town physician. After completing his early medical education at McGill University, Cotton travelled to Europe to do house jobs. There, he worked with the big names of the time, Friedrich Kraus and Georg Nicolai, co-authors of the first textbook of electrocardiography, and later, with Friedrich von Muller in Munich and Karel Wenckebach in Vienna. He then spent a short time in postgraduate training in the United States before moving to University College Hospital, London, in 1913, where he worked with Sir Thomas Lewis.

In 1928, Cotton married Molly Cotton, then a clinical assistant at the National Heart Hospital. They had no children.

== Cardiology career ==
Despite the age difference and distance between the two, Sir William Osler supported Cotton's postgraduate activities in England and abroad. Cotton later wrote, "the gates were opened wide for me to enter; a letter to Lewis from William Osler was all that was required to make life seem at its best".

Cotton briefly returned to Montreal General Hospital, where, in 1913, with the assistance of Osler's influence and financial contributions, Cotton was able to persuade the hospital to purchase an electrocardiograph. Cotton, as a result, became Canada's first electrocardiographer.

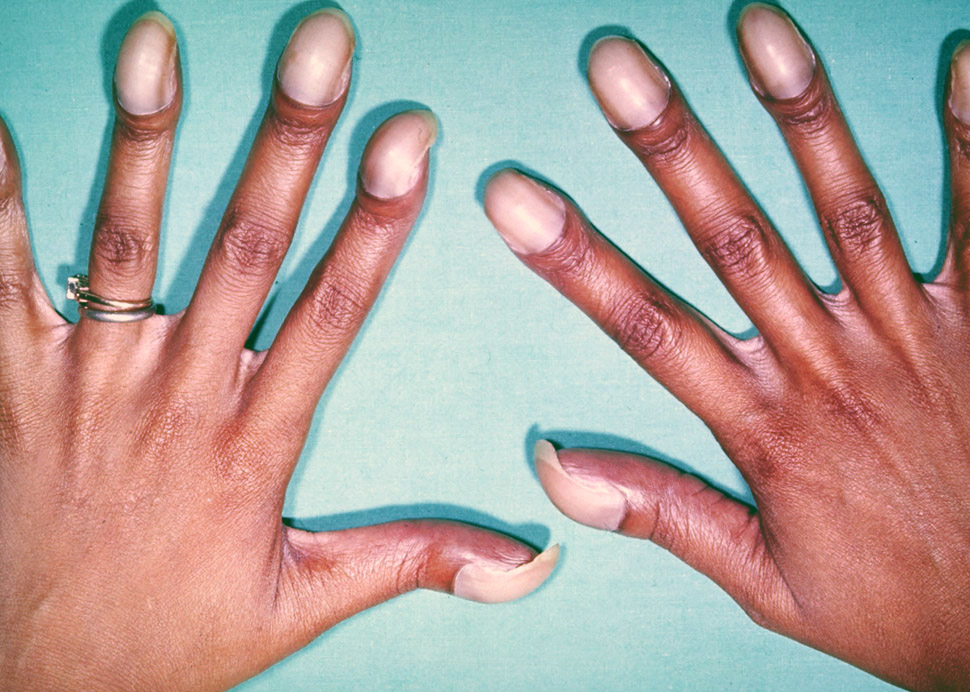
Finger clubbing

At the onset of the First World War, Cotton enlisted in the Canadian Expeditionary Force and re-joined Lewis at the Military Hospital, Hampstead, which had been established to carry out research into heart diseases in soldiers. It was at Hampstead that his path crossed with William Osler, Mackenzie, Clifford Allbutt, Caler, Meakins, Parkinson and Drury. In 1913 and 1917, he published ten papers in Heart, eight of which were co-authored with Lewis.

During his assignment in 1917 at the Sobraon Military Heart Hospital in Colchester, England, Cotton became interested in finger clubbing. He found that clubbing of fingers in adults known to have structural heart disease was a common clinical finding in infective endocarditis. His paper on clubbing in endocarditis is considered by cardiologists as a classic. Following postmortem information on men with "acquired structural heart disease" and clubbing, Cotton stated that although clubbing was not "a conclusive sign of infection, it is nevertheless one of the most valuable signs we possess in coming to a correct diagnosis". As a result, he was the first to recognize clubbing of the fingers as a sign of infective endocarditis.

In 1922, he was one of four men who founded the Cardiac Club in London.

== Death and legacy ==
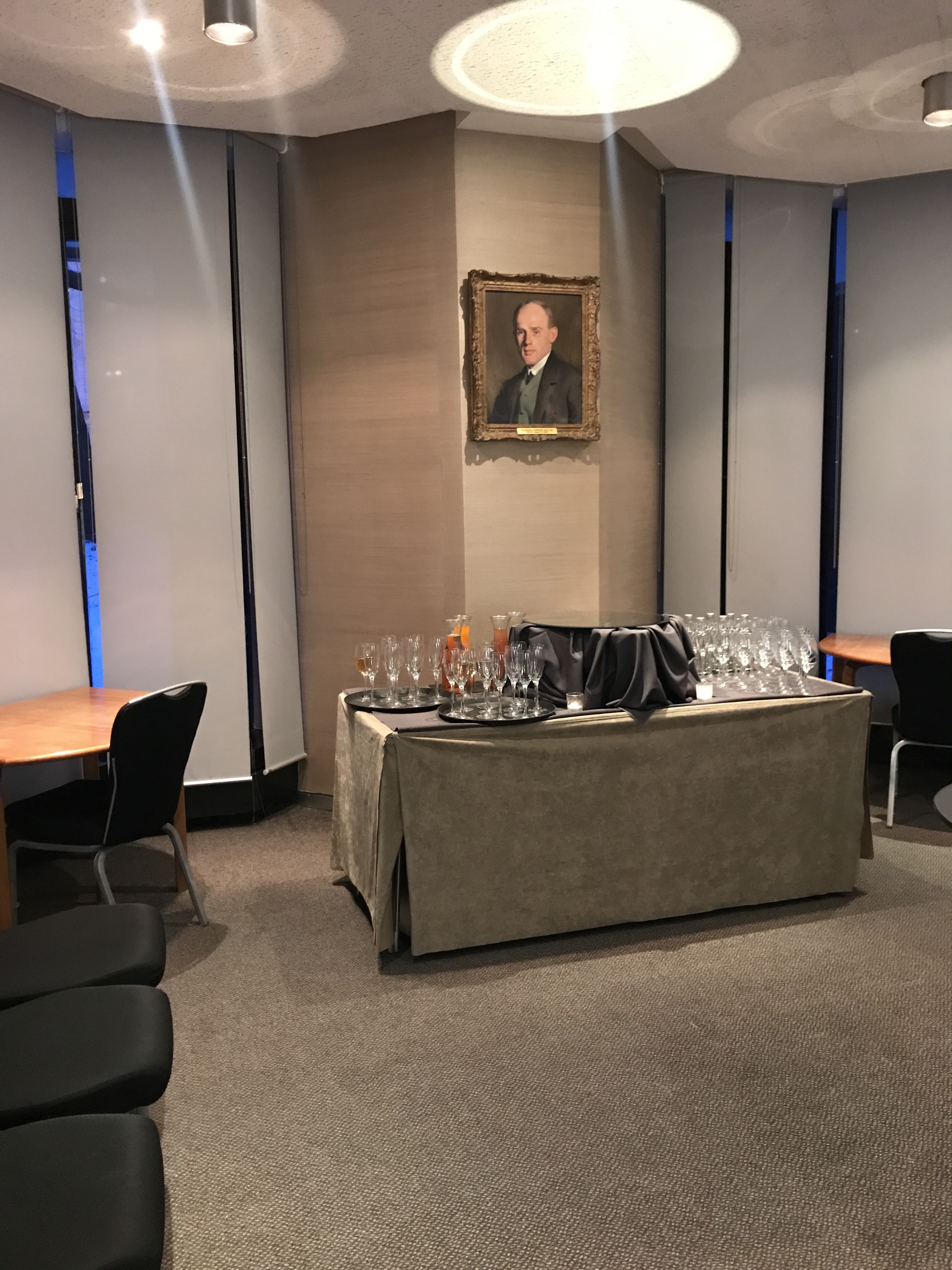
Thomas Cotton room

Cotton was an active member of the Osler Club of London. He had prospered from Canadian investments and following his death at the age of 80 on 26 July 1965, the Royal College of Physicians received a substantial bequest in his will. His ashes were concealed alongside those of Sir William and Lady Osler in the Osler Library at McGill. His respected chief Osler is remembered in the dining room, named as Cotton had wished, the Osler Room, and in an annual Osler oration. In return, the College honoured Cotton by putting up a plaque in the Osler room and establishing a separate room (known as the "Thomas Cotton Room") to house the library, archives and other possessions of the Osler Club. Some of his archives are held at McGill University in the Osler Library of the History of Medicine
