= Handan–Jinan railway =

Rail line in People's Republic of China

The Handan–Jinan railway or Hanji railway (simplified Chinese: 邯济铁路; traditional Chinese: 邯濟鐵路; pinyin: Hánjì tiělù) is a railway between Handan in Hebei and Jinan in Shandong Province in northern China. The single railway is 231.76 miles (372.98 km) in length and was built from 1996 to 1999 to carry coal from Shanxi Province.

When the Hanji Line began operation in 2000, it had a designed annual transport capacity of 20 million tons of goods a year. The line completed 21.56 million tons in 2001 and since 2003 has exceeded 30 million tons transported each year. The line is operated by Hanji Railway Company Limited, a state-owned joint-stock company based in Liaocheng with the Ministry of Railways, Shandong Province and Hebei Province as shareholders. In 2003, the line generated Y600 million profit. In 2008, planning began for a second track and electrification of the line, which would increase annual carrying capacity to 80-100 million tons.

On 10 December 2014 the section between Handan and Liaocheng began being used for long-distance passenger trains. This was the first time passenger services had operated on the line.

== Rail connections ==
- Handan: Beijing–Guangzhou railway, Handan–Changzhi railway
- Liaocheng: Beijing–Kowloon railway
- Jinan: Beijing–Shanghai railway
