= Campbell's theorem (geometry) =

Riemannian n-manifold embeds locally in an (n + 1)-manifold with flat Ricci curvature

Campbell's theorem, named after John Edward Campbell, also known as Campbell’s embedding theorem and the Campbell-Magaard theorem, is a mathematical theorem guaranteeing that any n-dimensional Riemannian manifold can be locally embedded in an (n + 1)-dimensional Ricci-flat Riemannian manifold.

== Statement ==
Campbell's theorem states that any n-dimensional Riemannian manifold can be embedded locally in an (n + 1)-manifold with a Ricci curvature of R_{'a b} = 0. The theorem also states, in similar form, that an n-dimensional pseudo-Riemannian manifold can be both locally and isometrically embedded in an n(n + 1)/2-pseudo-Euclidean space.

== Applications ==
Campbell’s theorem can be used to produce the embedding of numerous 4-dimensional spacetimes in 5-dimensional Ricci-flat spaces. It is also used to embed a class of n-dimensional Einstein spaces.
