= World Heart Federation =

Non-governmental organization based in Switzerland

World Heart Federation (WHF)
- Established: 1978; 48 years ago
- Mission: Cardiovascular health for everyone
- President: Prof. Daniel Piñeiro
- Location: Geneva, Switzerland
- Website: https://world-heart-federation.org/

The World Heart Federation (WHF) is a non-governmental organization based in Geneva, Switzerland, formed in 1978. WHF is recognized by the World Health Organization as its leading NGO partner in cardiovascular disease prevention.

== History ==
The World Heart Federation was formed in 1978 by a merger of the International Society of Cardiology and the International Cardiology Federation, under the name of the International Society and Federation of Cardiology. In 1998, this body changed its name to the World Heart Federation.

The World Heart Federation represents more than 200 organizations around the world. It works to promote cardiovascular health, and provide information on access to relevant information, care, and treatment.

The World Heart Federation is the cardiovascular disease (CVD) organization in official relations with the World Health Organization.

== Congresses and events ==
The World Heart Federation hosts the World Congress of Cardiology. The first World Congress of Cardiology was convened in Paris in September 1950 under the aegis of the International Society of Cardiology, which had itself been founded four years previously.

In 2000, World Heart Day was founded to inform people that CVD is the world's leading cause of death. World Heart Day is the world's biggest awareness-raising platform for CVD, celebrated every year on 29 September.

In 2016, the World Heart Federation hosted the first Global Summit on Circulatory Health, held in Mexico City. Attendees included ministers of health, public health officials, and industry leaders. In 2021, the Global Summit was renamed the World Heart Summit.
