= John Parkinson (cardiologist) =

English cardiologist

Sir John Parkinson FRCP (10 February 1885 – 5 June 1976) was an English cardiologist known for describing Wolff–Parkinson–White syndrome.

== Biography ==
Parkinson was born in Thornton-le-Fylde, Lancashire, the son of John Parkinson, JP. He was educated at University College London and studied medicine at the University of Freiburg and the London Hospital, qualifying in 1907. He received his M.D. in 1910, subsequently working as an assistant to Sir James Mackenzie at the London Hospital.

During the First World War, he served with the Royal Army Medical Corps, commanding a military cardiology centre in Rouen. After the war he returned to London Hospital, becoming consultant and head of the cardiology department. He also served as consultant to the National Heart Hospital and was a civilian cardiologist for the Royal Air Force from 1931 to 1956.

He was knighted by King George VI in 1948. The first European Congress of Cardiology opened on 10 September 1952 under the chairmanship of Parkinson.

Parkinson married Clara Elvina le Brocq, whom he met while in Rouen during the First World War, daughter of Alfred Le Brocq of St Helier. They had four daughters and one son. Their son, Robert Parkinson, was one of the "Channel Dash Heroes" killed during the Second World War in 1942, at the age of 19.
