= Daxing Jichang (Daxing Airport) station =

Subway and China Railway station complex in Langfang, China

Daxing Jichang (Daxing Airport) 大兴机场
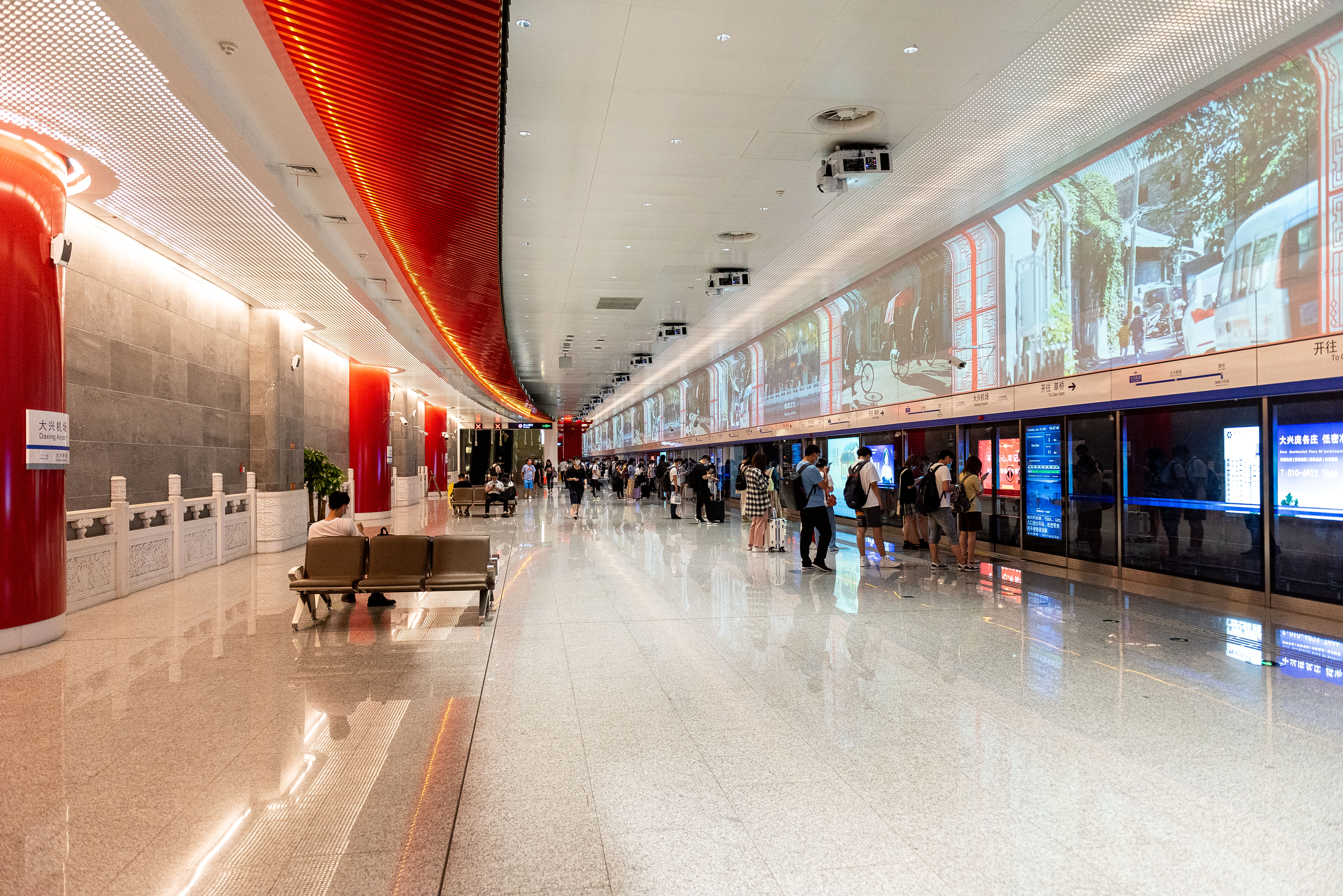
- Daxing Airport Express platform in 2021

General information
- Location: Beneath the north terminal of Beijing Daxing International Airport; Guangyang District, Langfang, Hebei; China
- Coordinates: 39.51249°N 116.41071°E
- Operator: Subway: Beijing Metro Operation Administration (BJMOA) Corp., Ltd. China Railway: China Railway Beijing Group
- Lines: Beijing Subway: Daxing Airport Express; China Railway: Beijing–Xiong'an intercity railway Tianjin–Daxing Airport intercity railway Huairou–Daxing Airport intercity railway
- Platforms: Subway: 2 side platforms China Railway: 4 island platforms (8 platform faces)
- Tracks: Subway: 2 China Railway: 10 (including 2 through tracks)
- Connections: Beijing Daxing International Airport

Construction
- Structure type: Underground
- Platform levels: 2

Other information
- Station code: China Railway: TMIS code: 21158; Telegram code: IWP; Pinyin code: DXC

History
- Opened: September 26, 2019 (subway and western railway yard); December 28, 2024 (eastern railway yard)

Services
Preceding station	Beijing Subway	Following station
Daxing Xincheng towards Caoqiao	Daxing Airport Express	Terminus
Preceding station	China Railway High-speed	Following station
Beijing Daxing towards Beijing West	Beijing–Xiong'an intercity railway	Gu'an East towards Xiong'an
Terminus	Tianjin–Daxing Airport intercity railway	Gu'an East towards Tianjin West
Terminus	Huairou–Daxing Airport intercity railway	Lixian towards Langfang North
Location

Daxing Jichang (Daxing Airport) station (Chinese: 大兴机场站; pinyin: Dàxīng Jīchǎng zhàn) is an underground passenger-rail complex beneath Beijing Daxing International Airport in Guangyang District, Langfang, Hebei. The complex contains two operationally separate passenger facilities: a Beijing Subway station on the Daxing Airport Express, operated by Beijing Metro Operation Administration, and a China Railway station serving the Beijing–Xiong'an, Tianjin–Daxing Airport, and Huairou–Daxing Airport intercity railways. The China Railway facility is itself arranged as two station yards, west and east of the subway station.

The two operators provide different kinds of service. The subway uses dedicated airport-express rapid-transit trains with a maximum operating speed of 160 km/h (99 mph). China Railway operates mainline high-speed Fuxing electric multiple-unit services: the Beijing–Xiong'an section approaching the airport was designed for 250 km/h (160 mph), while the open Huairou–Daxing Airport section was designed for 200 km/h (120 mph). Passengers transfer by walking between the subway and railway entrances through the airport's public transfer concourse.

== Services ==
=== Beijing Subway ===
The subway station is the southern terminus of the Daxing Airport Express. Northbound trains run toward Caoqiao via Daxing Xincheng. Beijing Metro Operation Administration has operated the line since it opened on September 26, 2019, and lists the Daxing Airport Express among the metro lines under its operation. It is the only Beijing Subway station in Hebei Province.

=== China Railway ===
The China Railway station is managed by Beijing West railway station under China Railway Beijing Group. It opened with Beijing–Xiong'an intercity services to Beijing West on September 26, 2019; the opening services were worked by Fuxing high-speed electric multiple units.

Direct Tianjin–Daxing Airport intercity services began on December 18, 2023. The first phase of the Huairou–Daxing Airport intercity railway, running from the airport to Langfang North, opened on December 28, 2024 and brought the eastern railway yard into passenger service.

== History ==
=== Subway station ===
During construction, the Daxing Airport Express station was known as North Terminal station (北航站楼站). A February 2019 naming proposal used Daxing Airport North, but the planning authority changed the proposed name to Daxing Airport after considering public comments in March.

The line and station began non-passenger trial running on June 15, 2019. They opened for passenger service with the airport on September 26.

=== China Railway station ===
The western railway yard originated as a station on the planned Beijing–Bazhou intercity railway. After the creation of Xiong'an New Area in 2017, the project was reoriented as the Beijing–Xiong'an intercity railway. The station's main structure was completed in February 2019. It opened on September 26, 2019.

The eastern railway yard was built in structural form at the same time as the airport but remained reserved for the then-named Intercity Railway Connector project. Its interior was completed before the first phase of the Huairou–Daxing Airport intercity railway opened on December 28, 2024.

== Station layout ==
The rail complex lies below the airport's north terminal. The public transfer and waiting areas are on basement level 1 (B1), and all platforms are on basement level 2 (B2). From west to east, the three parallel components are the western China Railway yard, the Daxing Airport Express subway station, and the eastern China Railway yard. China Railway describes its part of the complex as “one station with two yards”: platforms 1–4 are in the western yard and platforms 5–8 are in the eastern yard.

The common public concourse links both railway yards, the subway station, and the airport terminal. From the eastern railway yard's exit, the subway entrance is about a three-minute walk and the western railway yard's entrance is about a four-minute walk.

=== Subway station ===
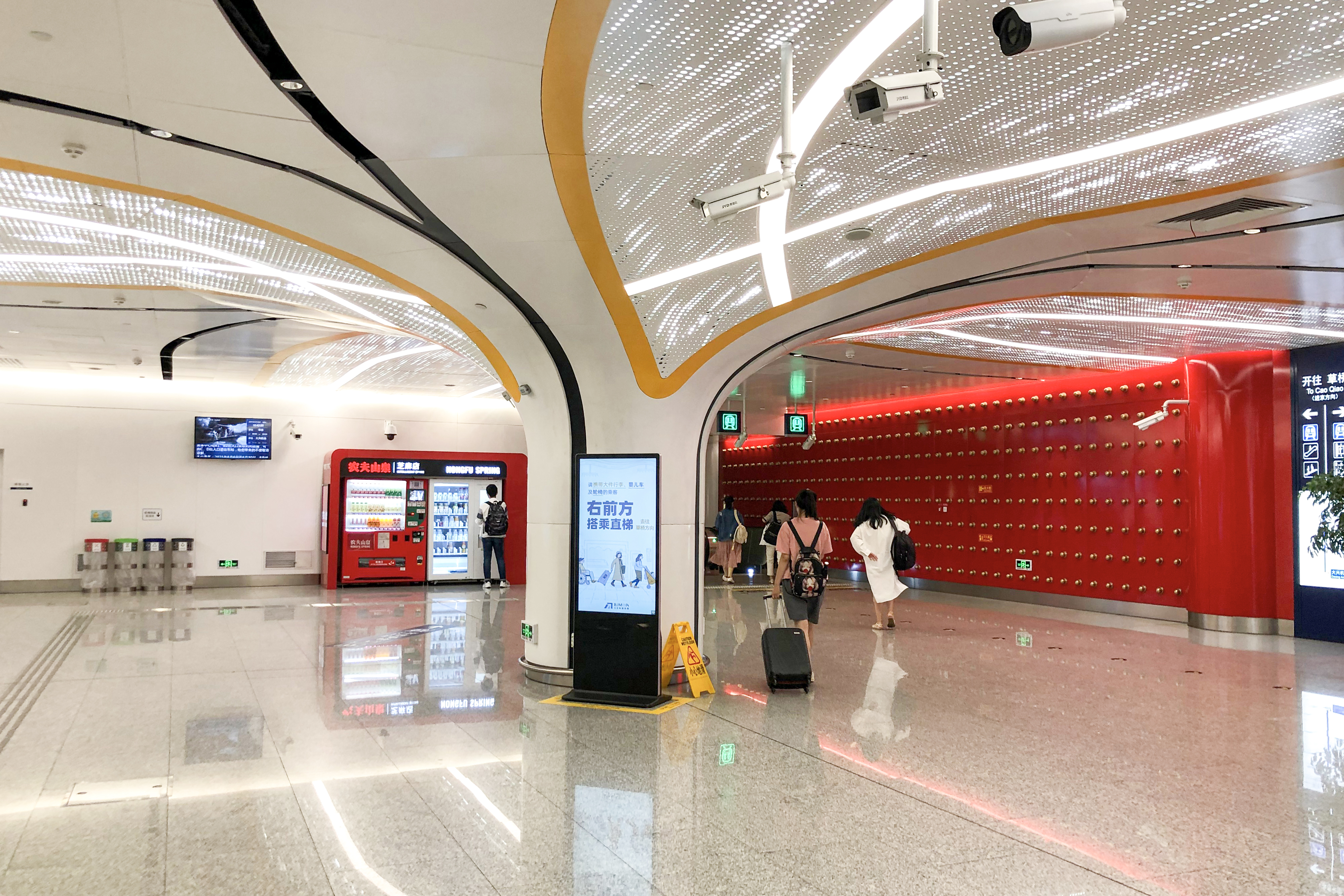
Subway concourse paid area

The subway station has two side platforms and two tracks on B2. One platform is used for arriving passengers and the other for departures toward Daxing Xincheng and Caoqiao.

=== China Railway station ===
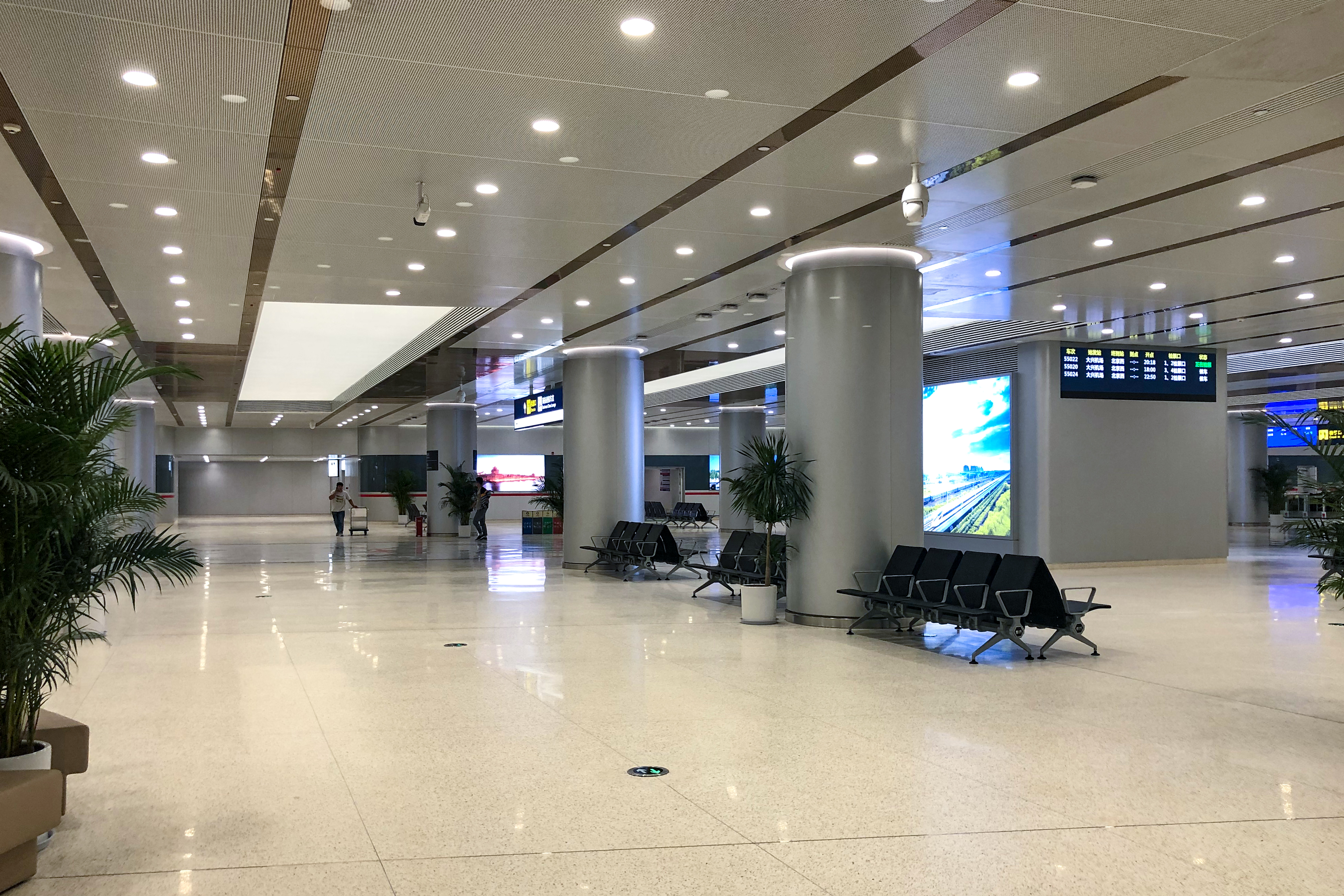
Western railway yard waiting room in 2019

The western railway yard has two island platforms, four platform tracks, and two central through tracks; its platform faces are numbered 1–4. The eastern yard has two island platforms and four tracks, with platform faces numbered 5–8. Platform screen doors are installed on the railway platforms; the western yard was Beijing's first intercity railway station to use them.

== Gallery ==
=== Subway station ===
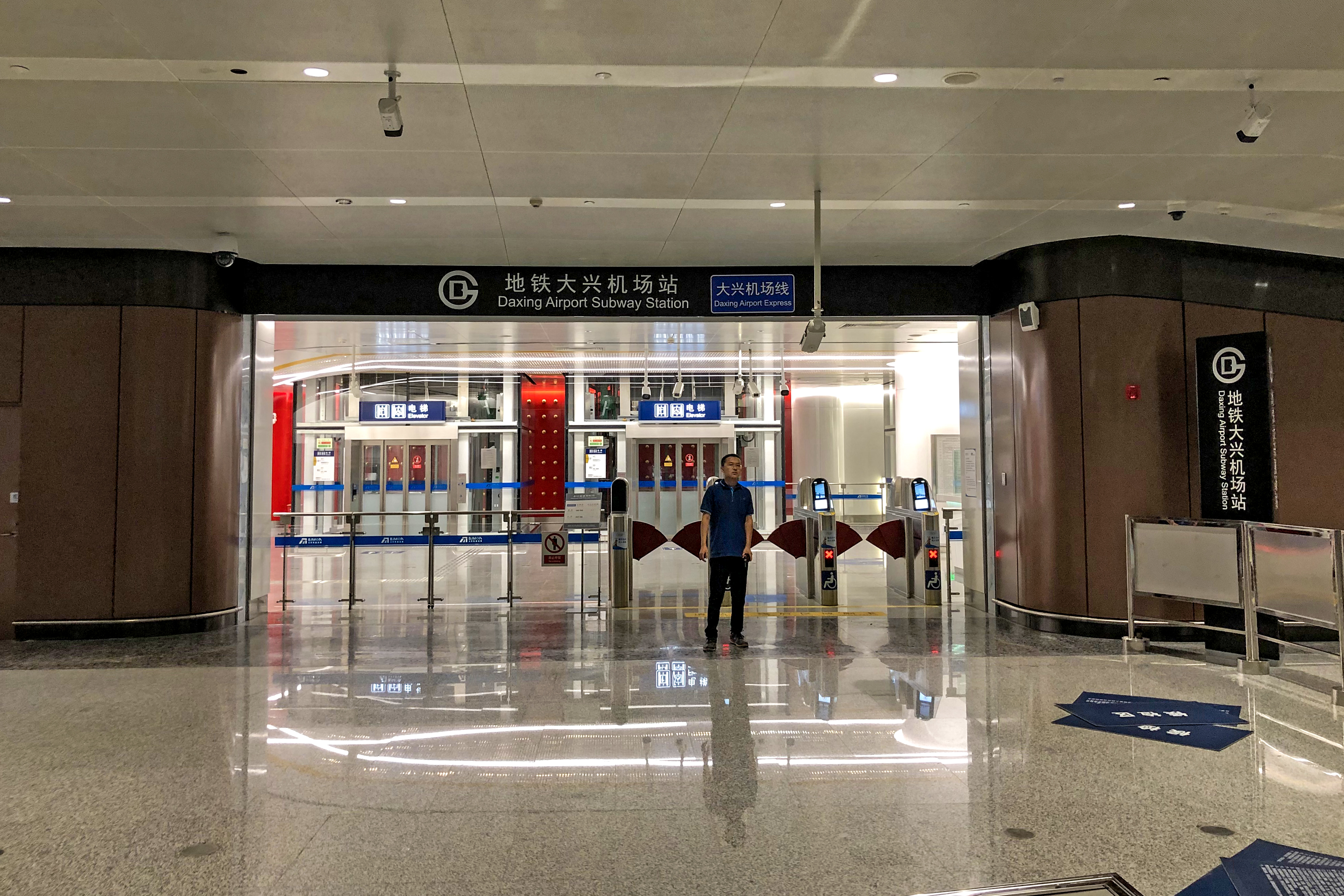
Subway entrance

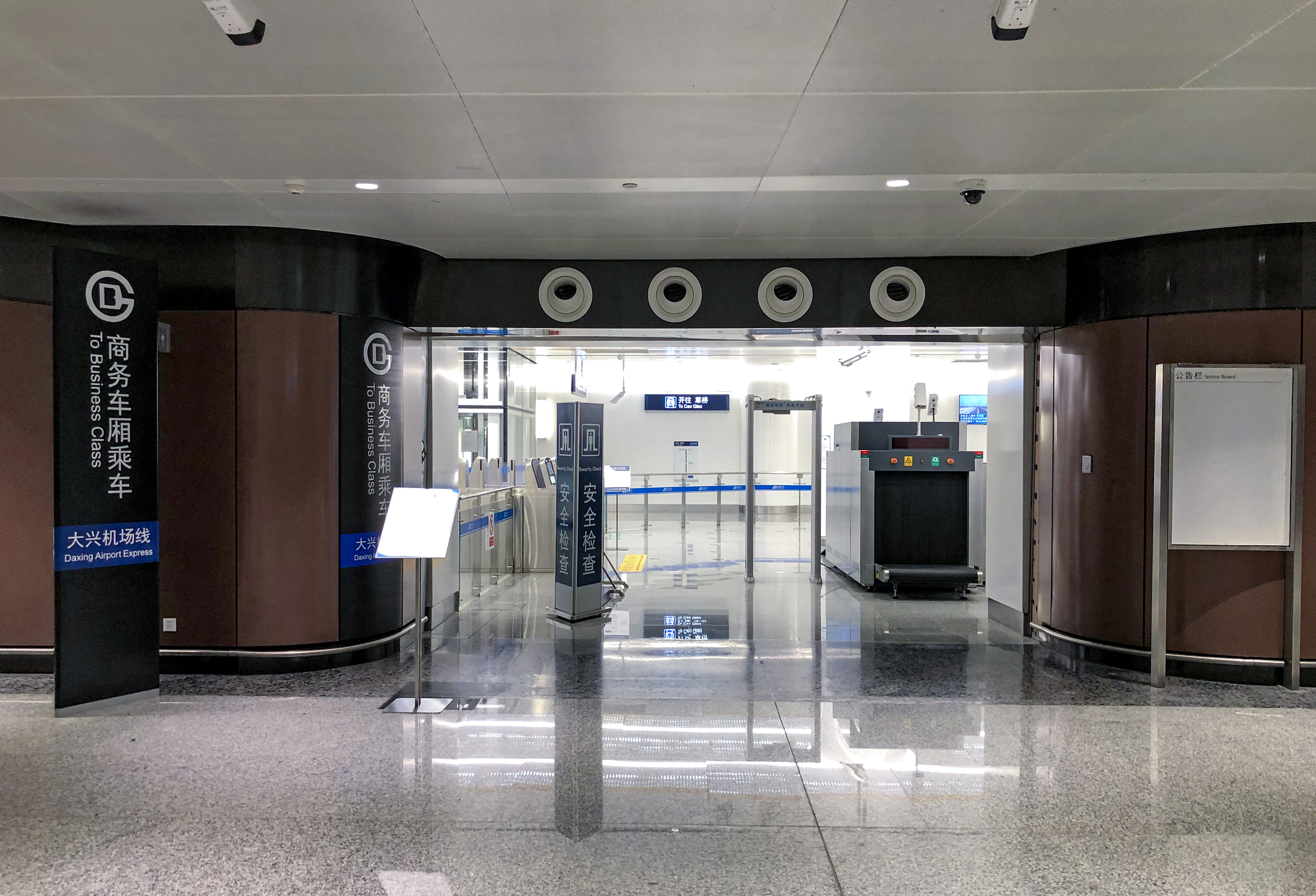
Business-class entrance

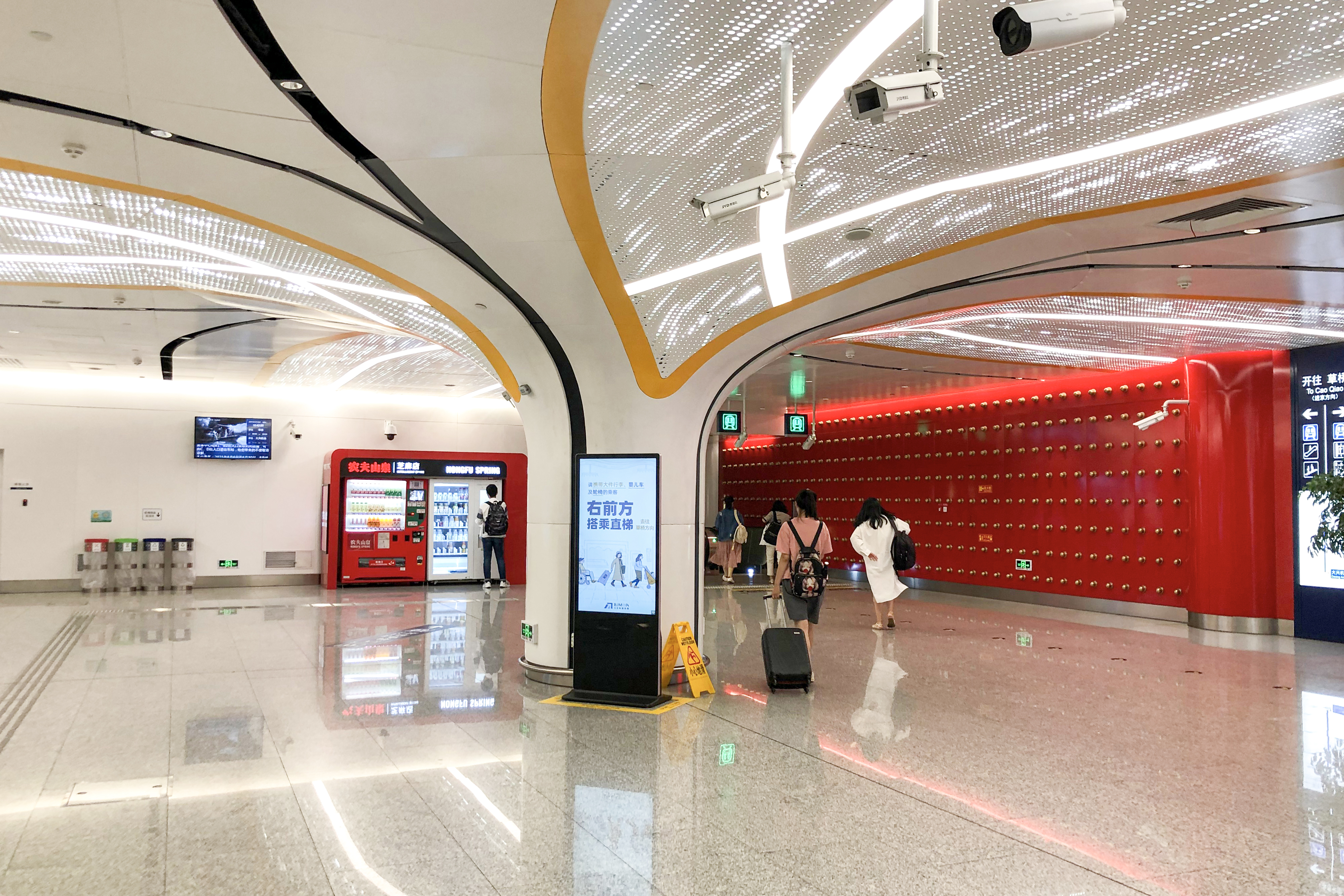
Subway concourse

=== China Railway station ===
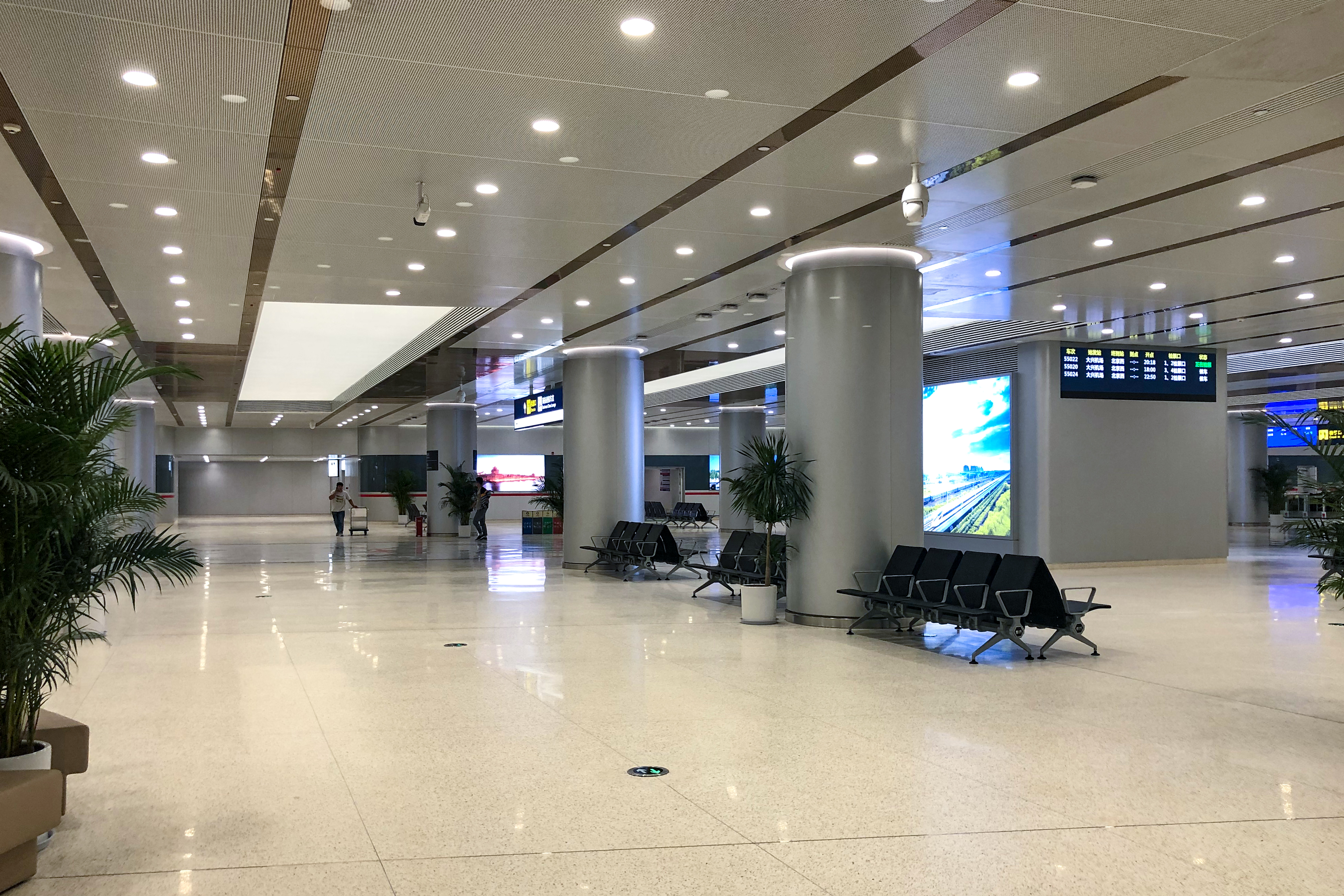
Western yard waiting room

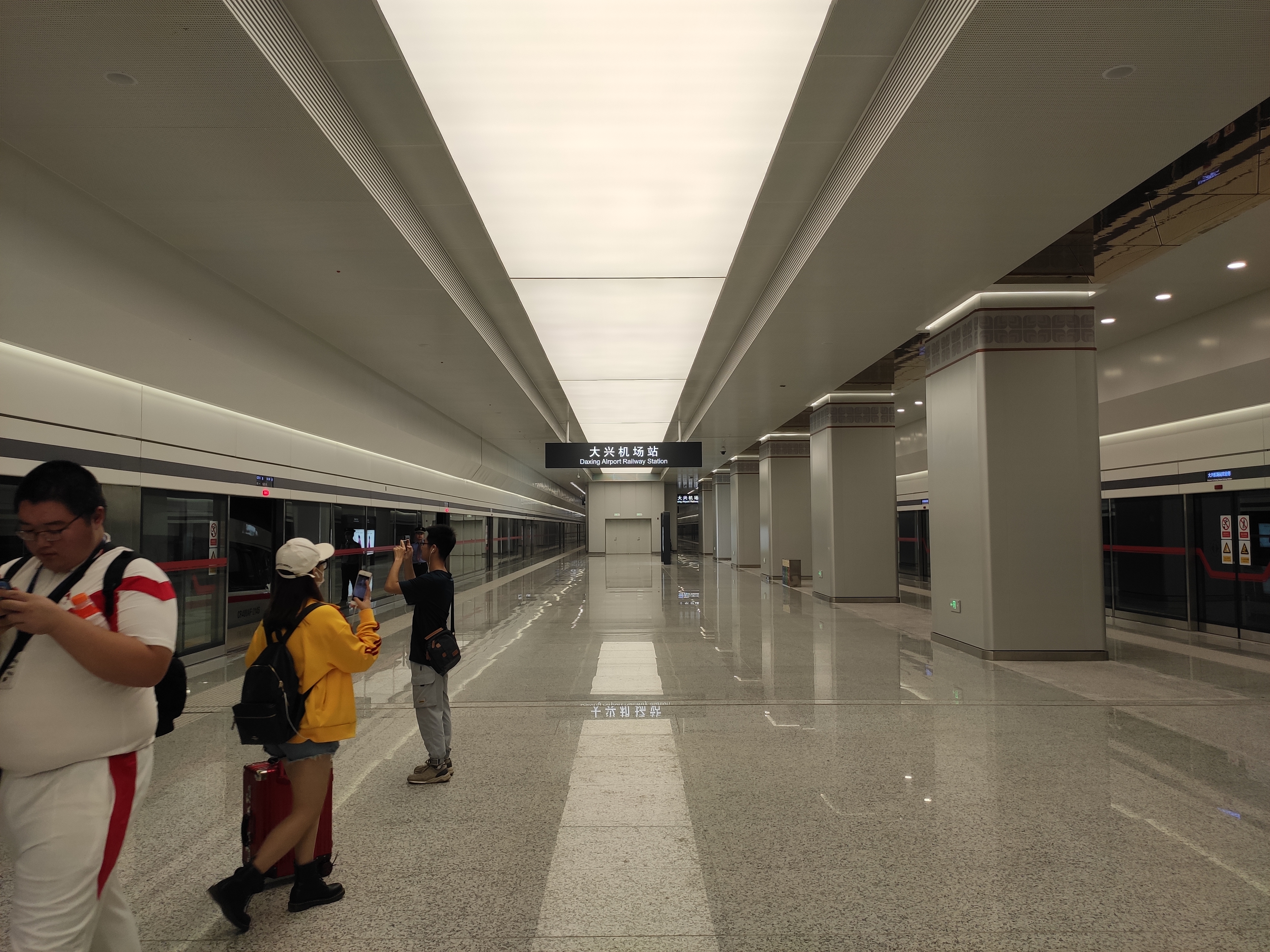
Platform and station sign

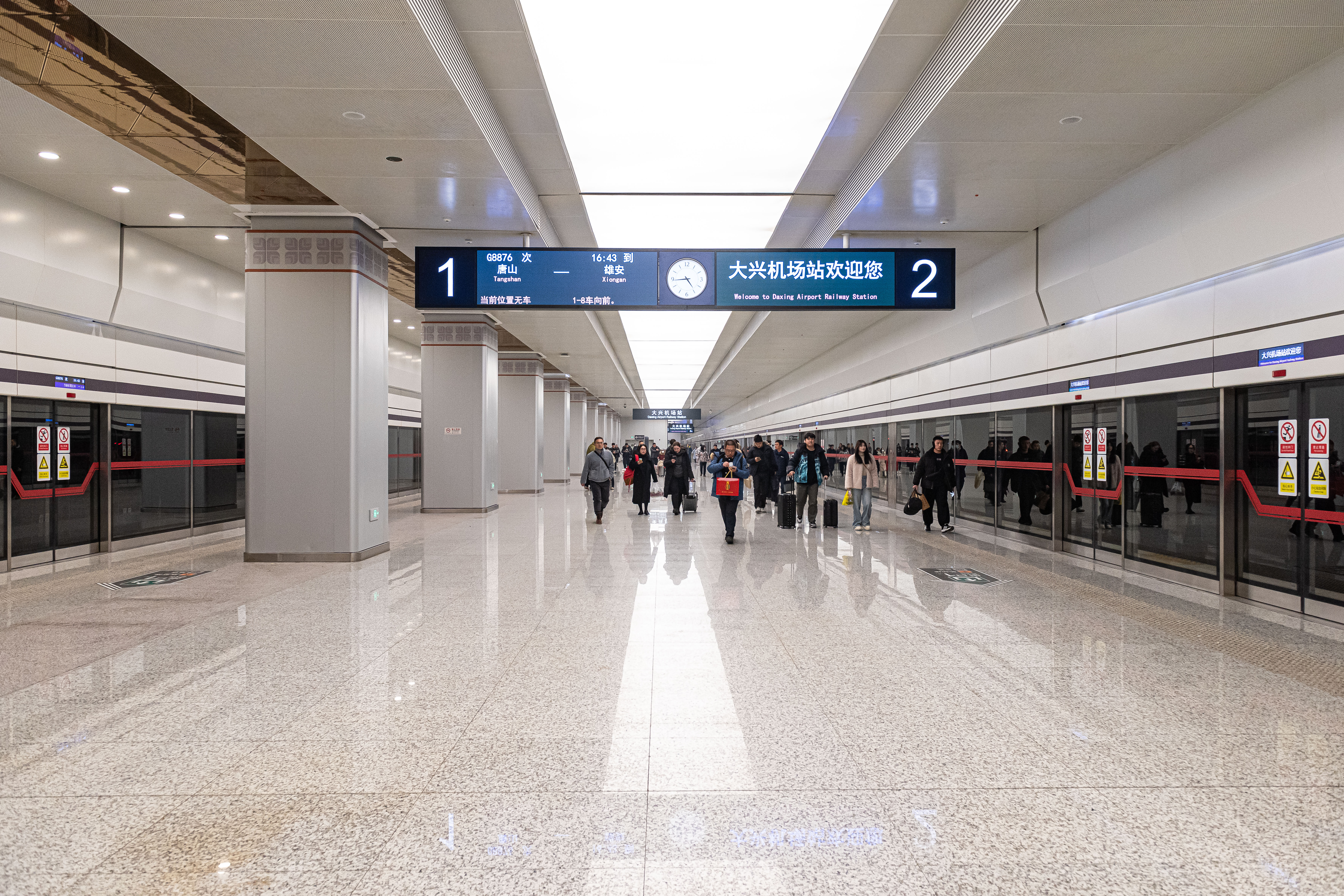
Platforms 1 and 2

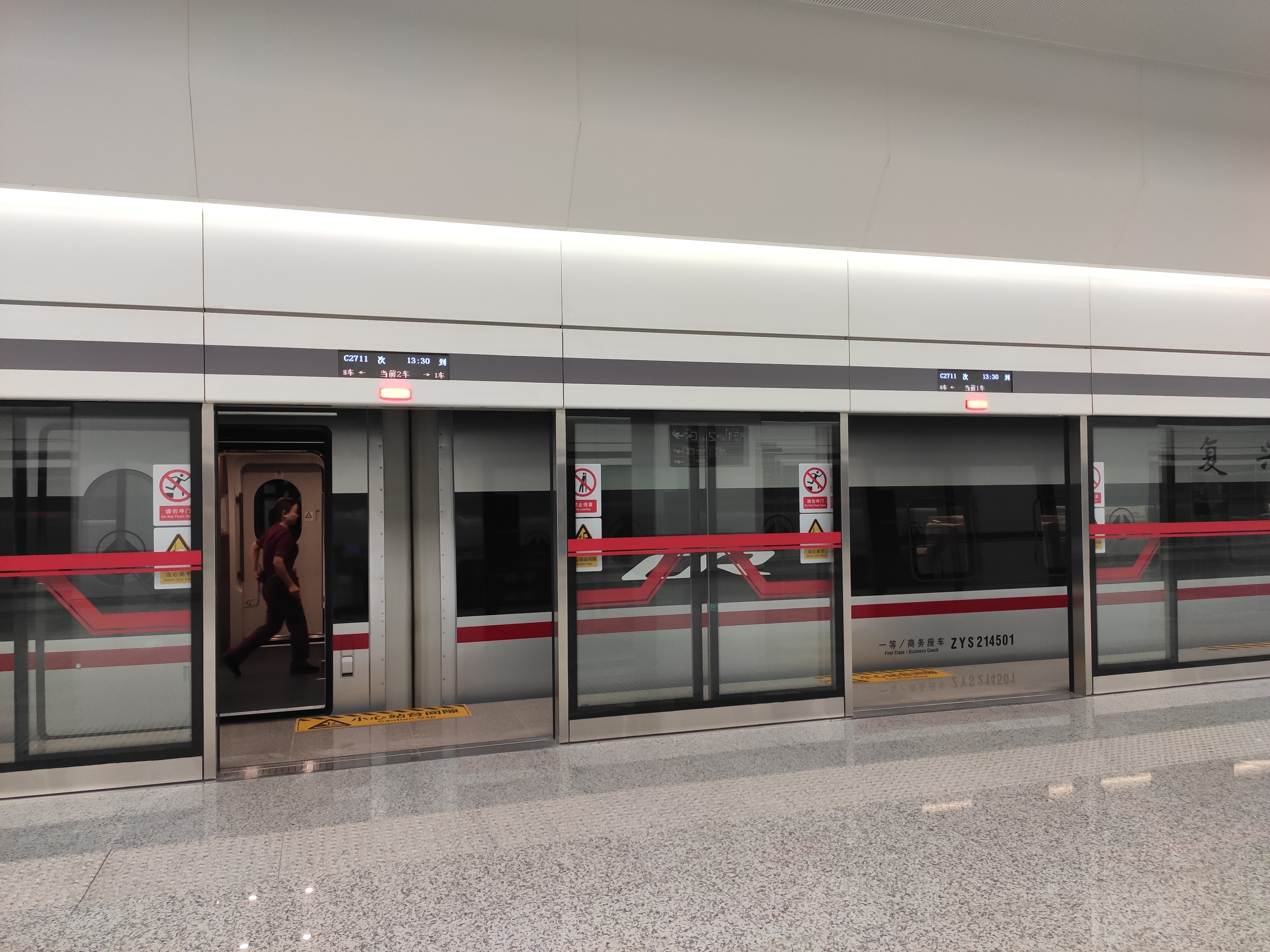
Railway platform screen doors
