= Huairou–Daxing Airport intercity railway =

Higher-speed rail in Beijing and Hebei, China

Overview
- Status: In operational
- Locale: Beijing and Hebei
- Termini: Daxing Airport; Langfang North (Phase 1)

Service
- Type: Higher-speed rail
- Operator(s): China Railway Beijing Group

History
- Opened: 28 December 2024

Technical
- Line length: 39.438 km (Phase 1)
- Track gauge: 1,435 mm (4 ft 8 1/2 in) standard gauge
- Operating speed: 200 km/h

Huairou–Daxing Airport intercity railway (Chinese: 怀兴城际铁路; pinyin: Huái–Xīng Chéngjì tiělù), formerly known as Capital Airport–Daxing Airport intercity railway connecting line (Chinese: 首都机场至大兴机场城际铁路联络线), is a higher-speed railway line currently under construction. The speed will be 200 km/h. It will connect the Beijing Capital International Airport and Beijing Daxing International Airport when the full line is completed.

Phase 1 of the railway, which is currently under construction, will connect Langfang North station in Langfang, Hebei Province) and Beijing Daxing International Airport. Phase 1 is 39.438 km, including 15.3 km in Beijing and 24.138 km in Hebei Province. Phase 1 of the railway is opened for service on 28 December 2024.

The second phase from Langfang East railway station to Huairou South railway station via Capital Airport is under planning.

== Stations ==
=== Phase 1 ===
Phase 1 of the railway (Daxing Airport to Langfang East) is shared with the Langzhuo (Langfang–Zhuozhou) intercity railway (Chinese: 廊涿城际铁路).

Station Name		Total distance (km)	Travel Time	Transfer	Location
English	Chinese	Total distance (km)	Travel Time	Transfer	Location
Through train to Jinxing
Daxing Airport	大兴机场	0		Daxing Airport Jingxiong; PKX	Guangyang District, Langfang, Hebei (Note: Actual location.)
Lixian	礼贤	6.268			Daxing District, Beijing
Langfang West	廊坊西	18.078			Guangyang District, Langfang, Hebei
Langfang North	廊坊北	28.018			Guangyang District, Langfang, Hebei

=== Phase 2 (under planning) ===
The Phase 2 of the railway will be replaced by New Town Link Line (S6) of Beijing Subway and the stations on the line have not announced.
