= Gu'an East railway station =

Railway station in Langfang, Hebei

Gu'an East 固安东
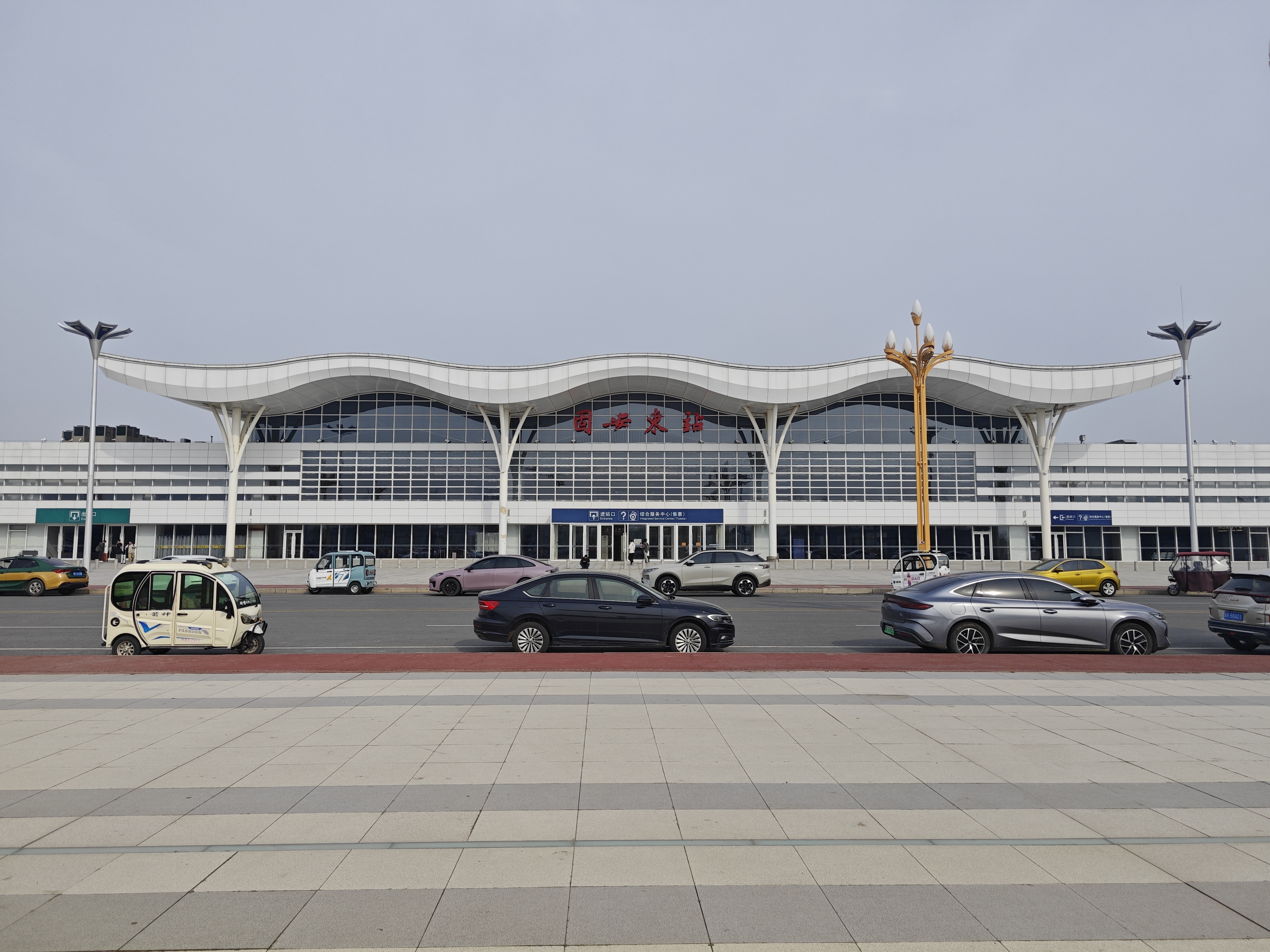

General information
- Location: Gu'an County, Langfang, Hebei; China
- Coordinates: 39°22′15.31″N 116°23′56.44″E
- Lines: Beijing–Xiong'an intercity railway; Tianjin–Daxing Airport intercity railway
Location

Gu'an East railway station (Chinese: 固安东站; pinyin: Gù'āndōng zhàn) is a railway station in Gu'an County, Langfang, Hebei, China.

== History ==
Beijing–Xiong'an intercity railway opened on 27 December 2020 and the Tianjin–Daxing Airport intercity railway opened on 18 December 2023.

Preceding station	China Railway High-speed	Following station
Daxing Airport towards Beijing West	Beijing–Xiong'an intercity railway	Bazhou North towards Xiong'an
