= Daxing Xincheng station =

Beijing Subway station

Daxing Xincheng 大兴新城
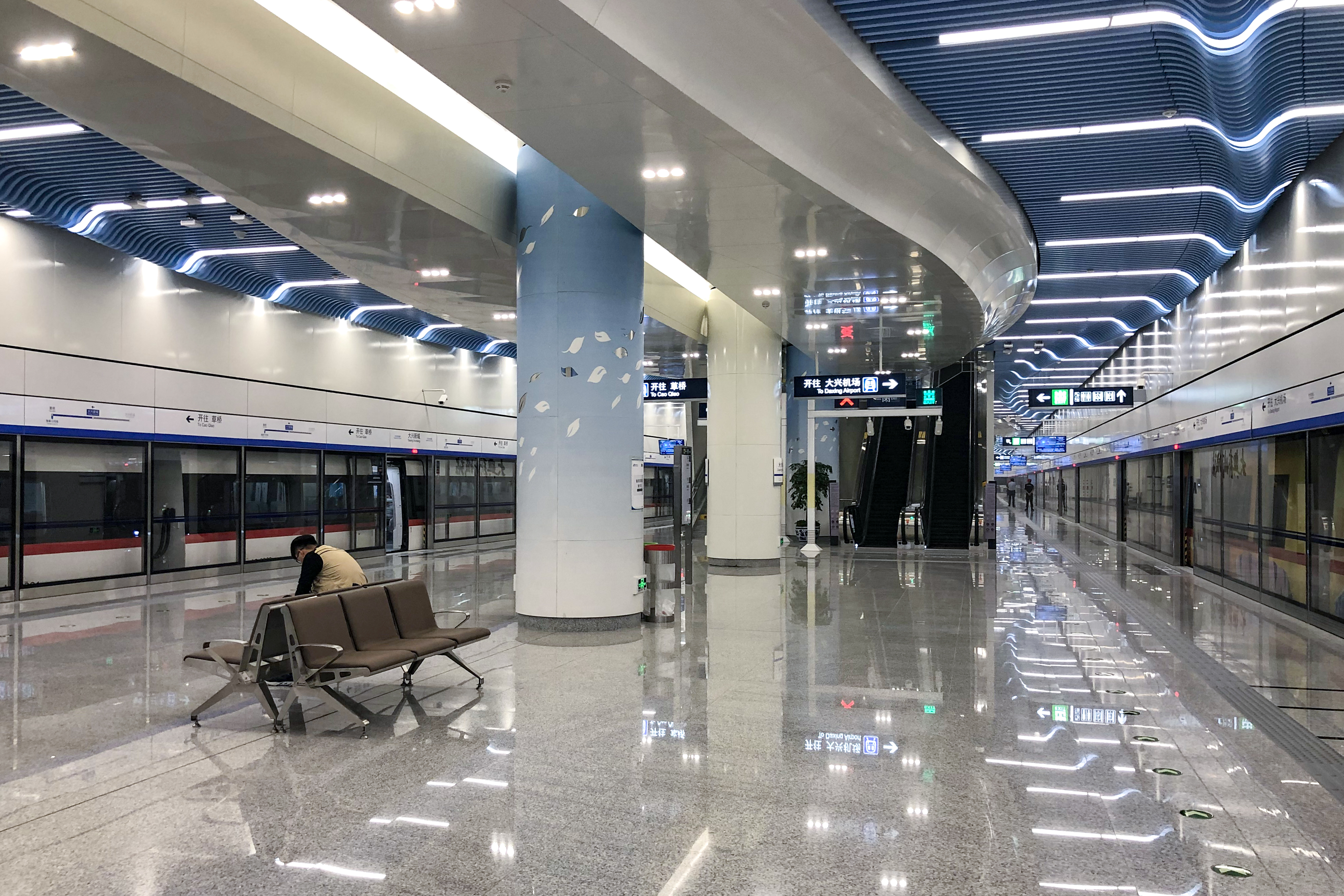
- Platform

General information
- Location: Guanyinsi Subdistrict, Daxing District, Beijing; China
- Coordinates: 39.731210°N 116.359549°E
- Operator: Beijing Metro Operation Administration (BJMOA) Corp., Ltd.
- Line: Daxing Airport Express
- Platforms: 2 (1 island platform)
- Tracks: 2

Construction
- Structure type: Underground
- Accessible: Yes

History
- Opened: September 26, 2019
- Former names: Cigezhuang (磁各庄), Guanyinsi (观音寺)

Services
| Preceding station | Beijing Subway | Following station |
|---|---|---|
| Caoqiao Terminus | Daxing Airport Express | Daxing Airport Terminus |
Location
- Location within Beijing

Daxing Xincheng station (Chinese: 大兴新城站; pinyin: Dàxīng Xīnchéng zhàn; lit. 'Daxing New Town station') is a station on the Daxing Airport Express of the Beijing Subway. It was opened on September 26, 2019.

== Station layout ==
The station has an underground island platform.

== Exits ==
There are 3 exits, lettered A, B, and C. Exits A and C are accessible.
