= Daxing Airport Express =

Airport rail link of Daxing Airport, part of Beijing Subway system

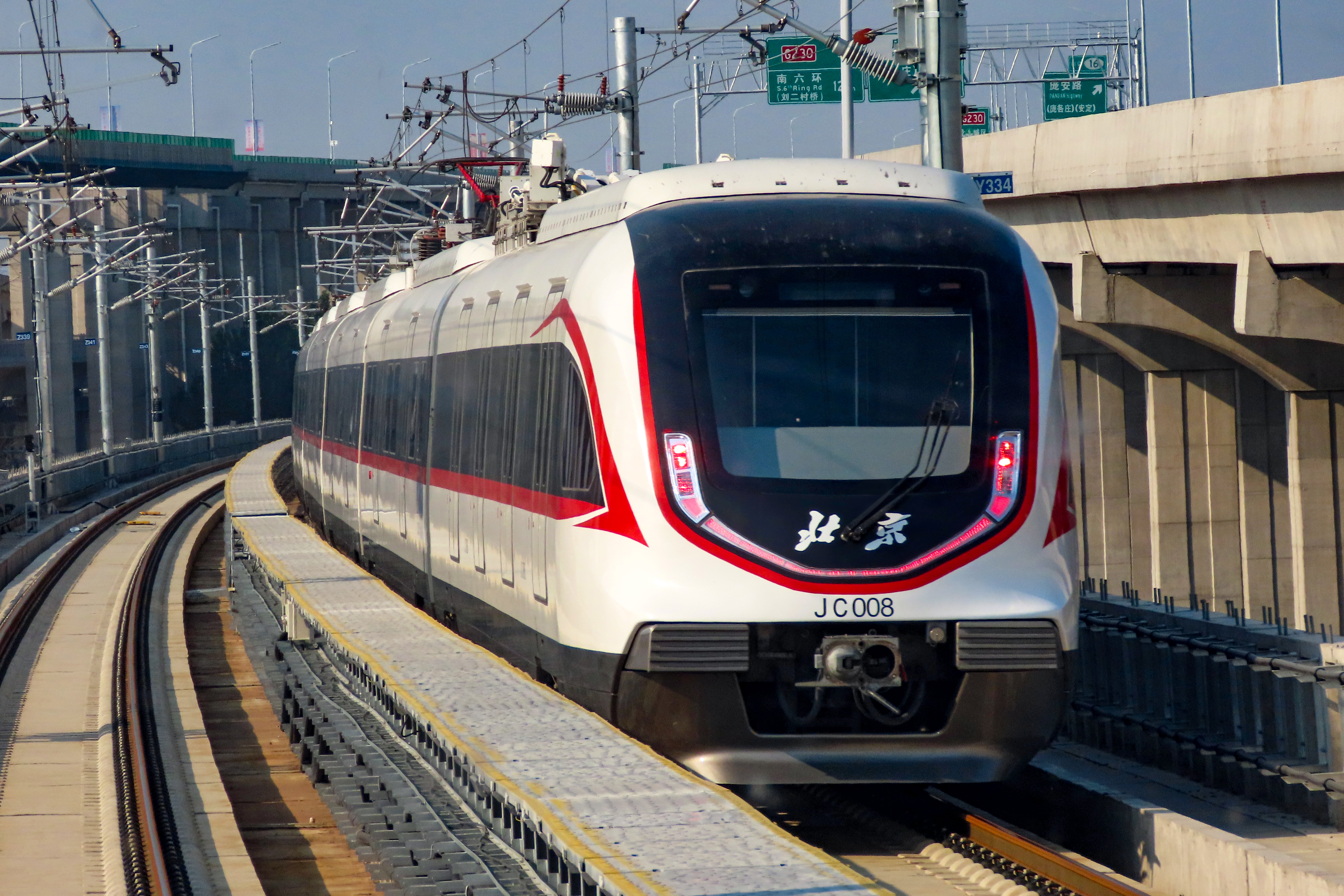
- A Daxing Airport Express train passing Beiwangchang Village, Panggezhuang Town

Overview
- Other name: M35 (planned name)
- Native name: 大兴机场线
- Status: Operational
- Locale: Fengtai, Daxing districts (Beijing) & Guangyang district (Langfang, Hebei Province)
- Termini: Caoqiao; Daxing Airport
- Stations: 3

Service
- Type: Rapid transit, Airport rail link
- System: Beijing Subway
- Operator(s): Beijing Metro Operation Administration (BJMOA) Corp., Ltd.
- Depot(s): Cigezhuang, New Airport North
- Rolling stock: 8-car Type D

History
- Opened: 25 September 2019; 7 years ago

Technical
- Line length: 41.36 km (25.70 mi) (in operation)
- Character: Underground and elevated
- Track gauge: 1,435 mm (4 ft 8 1/2 in) standard gauge
- Electrification: 25 kV 50 Hz AC from overhead catenary
- Operating speed: 160 km/h (99 mph) (maximum speed)

Daxing Airport Express
- Simplified Chinese: 北京地铁大兴机场线
- Traditional Chinese: 北京地鐵大興機場綫
Transcriptions
Standard Mandarin
- Hanyu Pinyin: Běijīng Dìtiě Dàxīng Jīchǎng Xiàn

The Daxing Airport Express (Chinese: 大兴机场线; pinyin: Dàxīng Jīchǎng Xiàn) is an airport rail link of the Beijing Subway that connects Caoqiao (located at the Southern 3rd Ring Road) and Beijing Daxing International Airport. It is colored blue on subway maps. The line opened on September 26, 2019.

It is one of two lines connecting the urban area of Beijing to the Beijing Daxing International Airport. The other line is the Beijing–Xiong'an intercity railway, a high-speed rail operated by China Railway.

The line is the second Beijing Subway line to be fully automated and driverless, after the Yanfang line.

== Description ==
=== Phase 1 ===
Phase 1 of the line is 41.36 km (25.70 mi), including 17.71 km (11.00 mi) of elevated track and 23.65 km (14.70 mi) of underground track. All stations are underground.

=== Phase 2 (Northern extension) ===
A 3.5 km (2.2 mi) northern extension to Lize Shangwuqu station is currently under construction. The extension is fully underground. The northern extension started construction in 2020 and will be completed in 2026.

== Fare ==
Ordinary Class one-way fare is ¥10, ¥25 or ¥35 (see below) and Business Class one-way fare is ¥50.

Ordinary Class (¥)
Caoqiao
10	Daxing Xincheng	
35	25	Daxing Airport

== Rolling stock ==
The train sets of Daxing Airport Express are built by CRRC Qingdao Sifang.

8 Car Train

	← Caoqiao Daxing Airport →							
Car No.	1	2	3	4	5	6	7	8
Designation	Tc	M	Tp	M	M	Tp	M	Xc
Numbering	JC 0xx1	JC 0xx2	JC 0xx3	JC 0xx4	JC 0xx5	JC 0xx6	JC 0xx7	JC 0xx8

- Car 7 is a business class car.
- Car 3 has a wheelchair space.
- Car 8 is a baggage car.

4 Car Train

	← Caoqiao Daxing Airport →			
Car No.	1	2	3	4
Designation	Tc	Mp	Mp	Tc
Numbering	JC 4xx1	JC 4xx2	JC 4xx3	JC 4xx4

- Car 4 is a business class car.
- Car 3 has a wheelchair space.

== Stations ==
Route of Daxing Airport Express

Section	Station Name		Connections	Nearby bus stops	Distance km		Location	
Section	English	Chinese	Connections	Nearby bus stops	Distance km		Location	
Phase 2 (Northern extension)	Lize Shangwuqu	丽泽商务区	14 16				Fengtai	Beijing
Phase 1	Caoqiao	草桥	10 19	381 410 423 434 456 483 497 529 676 679 专179 专209	0.000	0.000	Fengtai	Beijing
Phase 1	Daxing Xincheng	大兴新城		946 兴33 兴37	13.028	13.028	Daxing	Beijing
Phase 1	Daxing Jichang (Daxing Airport)	大兴机场	Jingxiong; PKX		25.303	38.331	Guangyang	Langfang, Hebei Province
Long-term planning	Daxing Airport South	大兴机场南					Daxing	Beijing

== History ==
The Daxing Airport Express was originally planned to start from Mudanyuan, and be routed in parallel with Line 19 from Mudanyuan to Caoqiao. However, the plan would cost more than 40 billion yuan, which was considered too expensive for a dedicated line that would only serve passengers going to and from the airport. The parallel section with Line 19 was abandoned and the route was shortened to the stretch from Caoqiao to Daxing Airport. The investment required for the line was reduced by 20 billion yuan.

In 2014, it was reported that the government was going to invest 19.7 billion yuan in the Daxing Airport Express and a plan with 4 stations: Caoqiao, Daxing Xincheng, and two stations at the Daxing Airport.

In early 2016, it was announced that the Daxing Airport Express was slated for completion by 2019. Phase I of the line includes only 3 stations: Caoqiao, Daxing Xincheng and Daxing Airport. The line will operate at a top speed of 160 km/h (99 mph) using Type D rolling stock, which is fully automated. Construction started at the end of 2016.

Test runs on the line began in June 2019, and the line was opened on September 26, 2019 (Phase 1).

Segment	Commencement	Length	Station(s)	Name
Caoqiao — Daxing Airport	26 September 2019	41.36 km (25.70 mi)	3	Phase I

== Future expansion ==
=== North ===
A northern extension to Lize Business District station is under construction, with a length of 3.5 km (2.17 mi). The extension will be fully underground, and will bring the line to a total of 44.86 km (27.87 mi). The northern extension started construction in 2020 and will be completed in 2026.

=== South ===
A southern extension to Daxing Airport South is also planned for the long term.

=== Jing Xiong Express ===
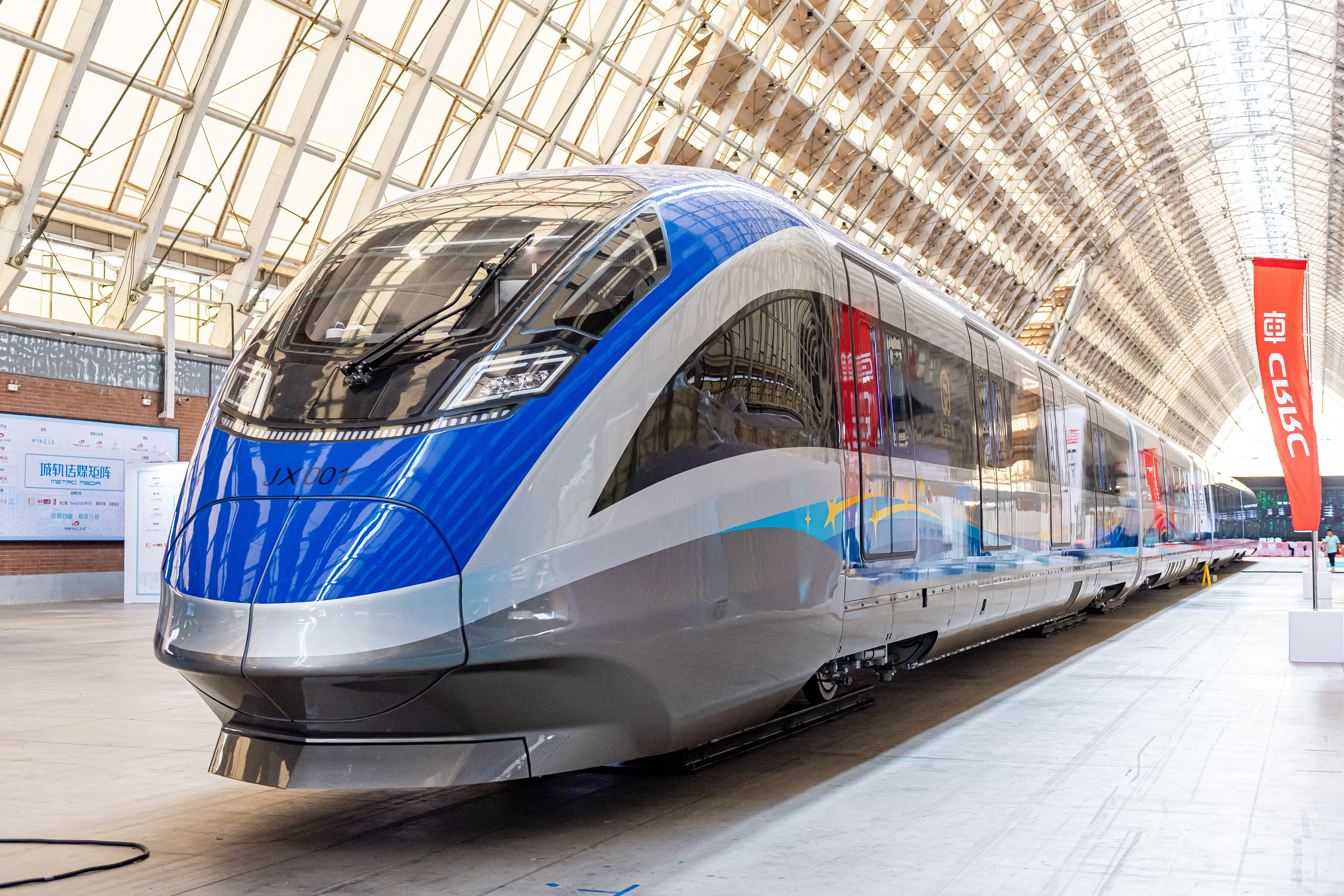
Rolling stock of Jing Xiong Express which will also operate on Daxing Airport Express

Jing Xiong Express (also known as Line R1 of Xiong'an Rail Transit) will through-operate with Daxing Airport Express. The section from Daxing Airport to Xiong'an Terminal is under construction. The section is 86 km (53.44 mi) in length, including 65.7 km (40.82 mi) elevated. It is expected to open in 2026.

Stations

Station Name		Connections	Location		
English	Chinese	Connections	Location		
↑Through operation to Daxing Airport Express
Yongqing Linkong	永清临空		Yongqing	Langfang	Hebei Province
Bazhou Development Zone	霸州开发区		Bazhou	Langfang	Hebei Province
Xiong'an Railway Station	雄安站	IQP	Xiong'an New Area	Baoding	Hebei Province
Xiongzhou	雄州		Xiong'an New Area	Baoding	Hebei Province
Universities	大学		Xiong'an New Area	Baoding	Hebei Province
Jinrongdao	金融岛		Xiong'an New Area	Baoding	Hebei Province
Xiong'an Intercity	雄安城际		Xiong'an New Area	Baoding	Hebei Province
