= Beijing Daxing International Airport =

International Airport in China

Beijing Daxing International Airport 北京大兴国际机场

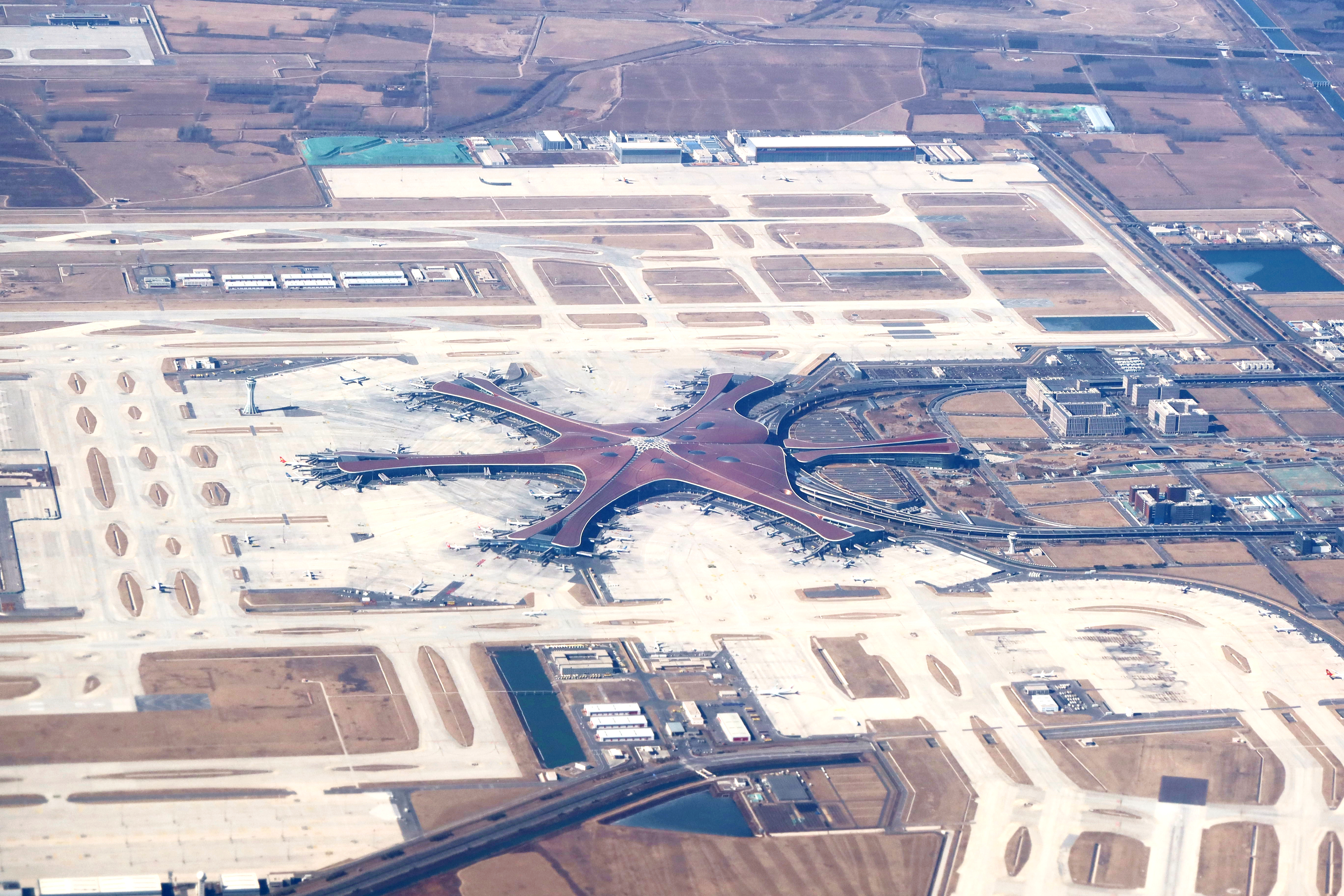
- Aerial photo of the airport
- IATA: PKX; ICAO: ZBAD

Summary
- Airport type: Public
- Owner/Operator: Beijing Capital International Airport Company Limited
- Serves: Beijing, Tianjin and Hebei
- Location: Daxing, Beijing; Guangyang, Langfang, Hebei
- Opened: Opening ceremony: 25 September 2019; 7 years ago; First commercial flight: 26 September 2019; 7 years ago
- Hub for: Air China; Beijing Capital Airlines; China Eastern Airlines; China Southern Airlines; China United Airlines; XiamenAir
- Focus city for: Hebei Airlines
- Time zone: China Standard Time (+8)
- Elevation AMSL: 98 ft (30 m)
- Coordinates: 39°30′33″N 116°24′38″E
- Website: www.bdia.com.cn

Maps
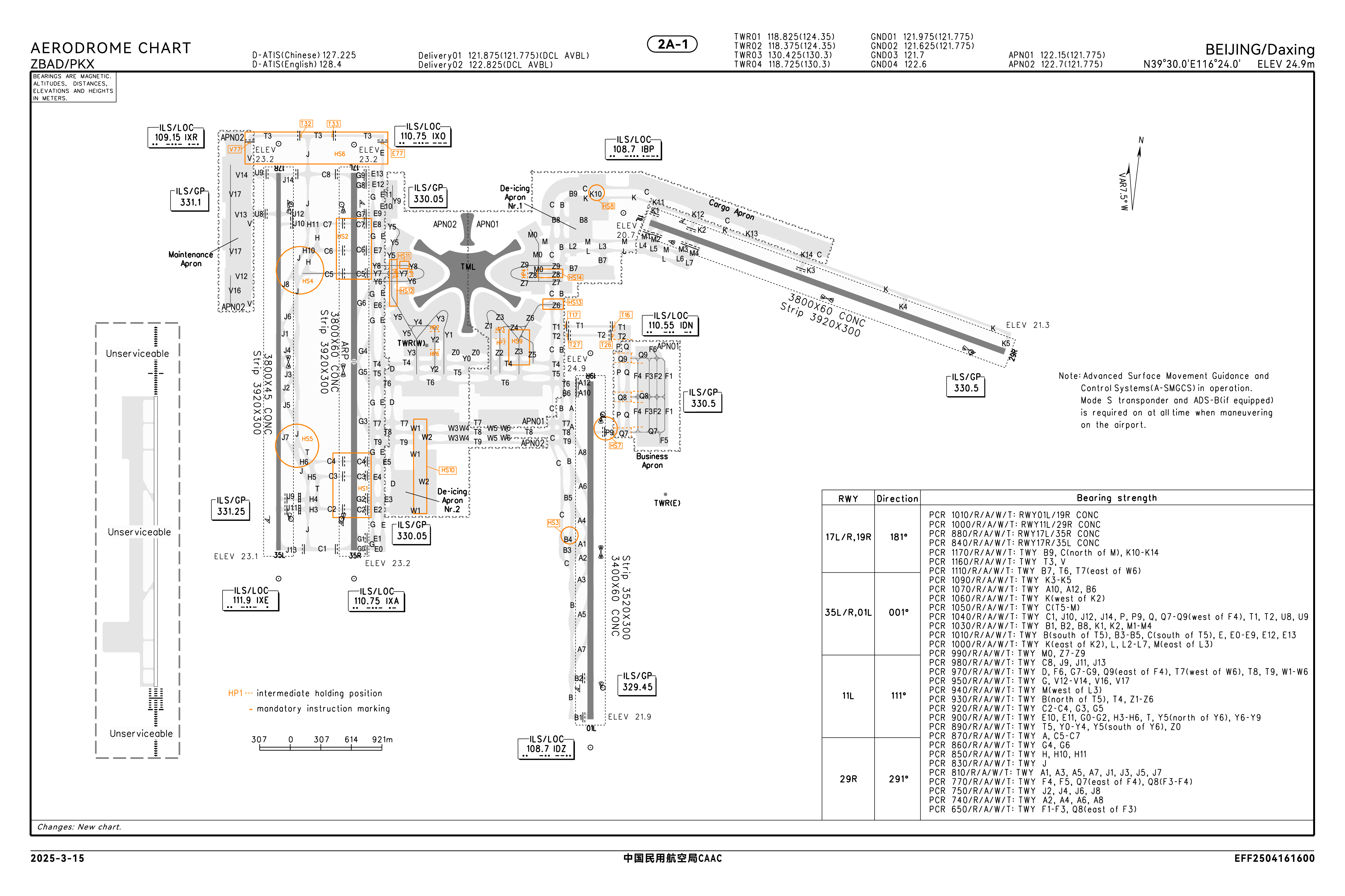
- CAAC airport chart

- Location in Beijing Location in Hebei Location in China

Runways
Direction	Length		Surface
Direction	m	ft	Surface
01L/19R	3,400	11,155	Concrete
17L/35R	3,800	12,467	Concrete
17R/35L	3,800	12,467	Concrete
11L/29R	3,800	12,467	Concrete

Statistics (2025)
- Passengers: 53,618,949 ▲8.5%
- Aircraft movements: 345,791 ▲6.3%
- Cargo (Metric tonnes): 369,159.7 ▲13.2%
- Source:, List of the busiest airports in China

Beijing Daxing International Airport
- Simplified Chinese: 北京大兴国际机场
- Traditional Chinese: 北京大興國際機場
Transcriptions
Standard Mandarin
- Hanyu Pinyin: Běijīng Dàxīng Guójì Jīchǎng
- Bopomofo: ㄅㄟˇ ㄐㄧㄣ ㄉㄚˋ ㄒㄧㄥ ㄍㄨㄛˊ ㄐㄧˋ ㄐㄧ ㄔㄤˇ
- Wade–Giles: Pei^{3}-ching^{1} Ta^{4}-hsing^{1} Kuo^{2}-chi^{4} Chi^{1}-chʻang^{3}
- Tongyong Pinyin: Běijing Dà-sing Guó-jì Ji-chǎng
- IPA: [pèɪ.tɕíŋ tâ.ɕíŋ kwǒ.tɕî tɕí.ʈʂʰàŋ]
Wu
- Romanization: Pok^{入} cin^{平} Da^{去} shin^{去} Kok^{入} ji^{平} Ji^{平} zan^{去}
Yue: Cantonese
- Yale Romanization: Bākgīng Daaihhīng Gwokjai Gēichèuhng
- Jyutping: bak1 ging1 daai6 hing1 gwok3 zai3 gei1 coeng4
- IPA: [pɐk̚˥ kɪŋ˥ taj˨ hɪŋ˥ kʷɔk̚˧ tsɐj˧ kej˥ tsʰœŋ˩]
Southern Min
- Hokkien POJ: Pak-kiann Tōa-heng Kok-chè Ki-tiûnn

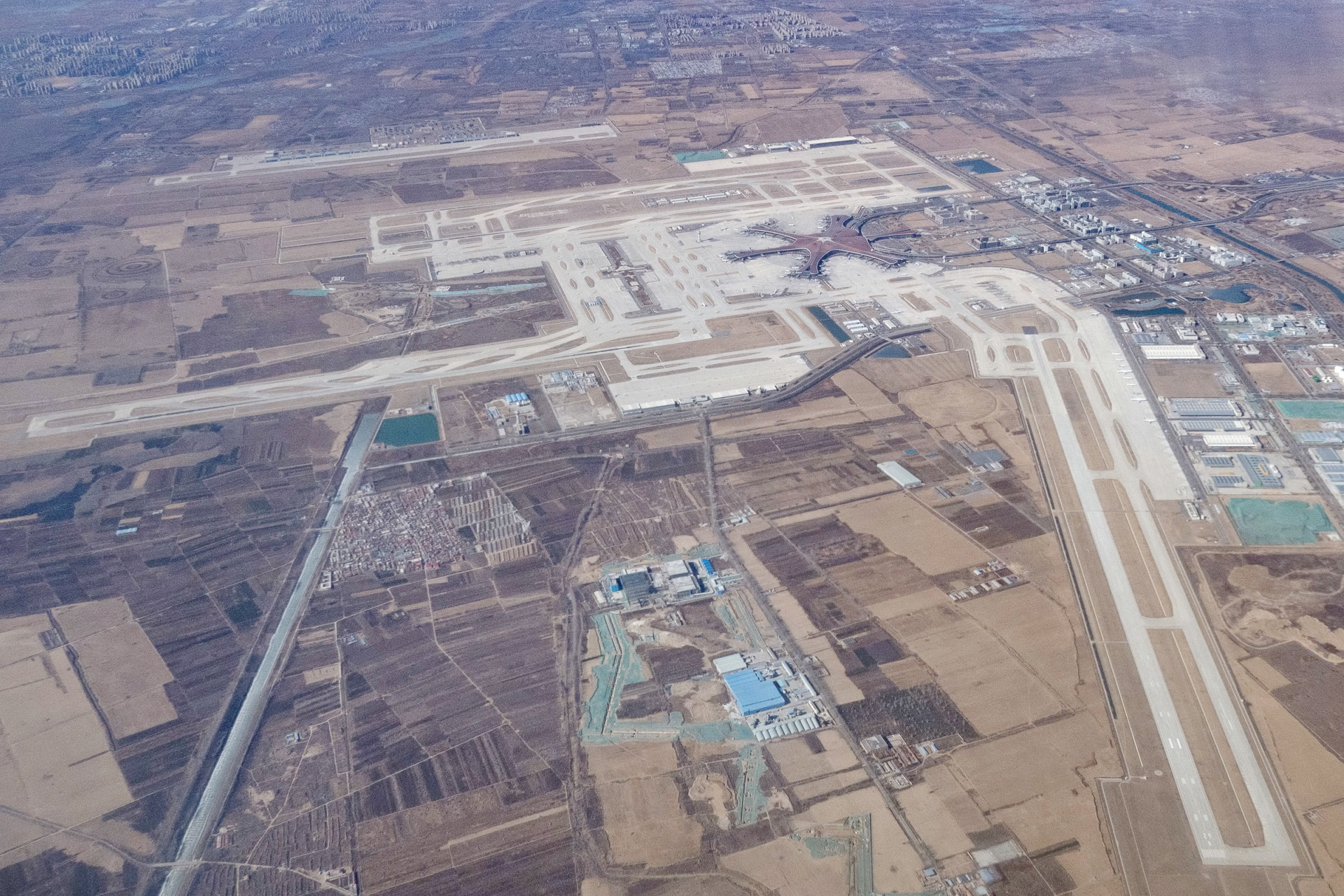
Aerial view of Beijing Daxing International Airport with Beijing Nanjiao Airport in the background

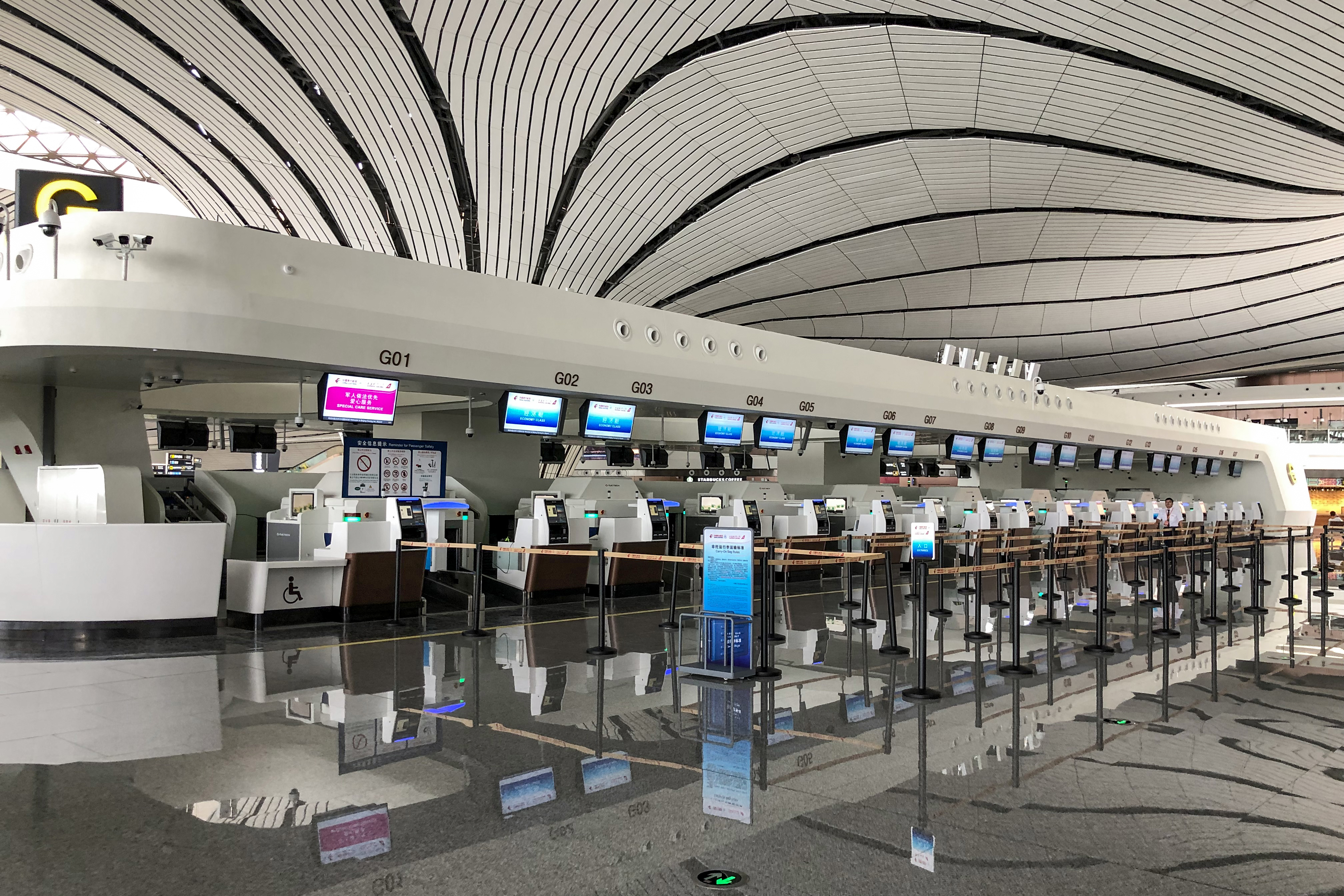
China Eastern Airlines check-in counters

Beijing Daxing International Airport (IATA: PKX, ICAO: ZBAD) is one of two international airports serving Beijing, the capital of China (the other being the busier Beijing Capital International Airport).

The airport is located on the border of Beijing and Langfang, Hebei. It has been nicknamed "the starfish" owing to its unique starfish-shaped terminal. It was completed on 30 June 2019 and began operations on 26 September 2019. Beijing Daxing covers an expanse of 2,679 hectares (6,620 acres) and has four civilian runways and the nearby Beijing Nanjiao Airport serving as a military air base and a potential 5th runway in the future.

The airport is 46 kilometers (29 mi) south of Beijing, 26 kilometers (16 mi) west of Langfang, and 65 kilometers (40 mi) south of Beijing Capital International Airport, and serves the entire Beijing, Tianjin and Hebei region as well. It is a hub for SkyTeam alliance airlines and some Oneworld members, while Hainan Airlines and most Star Alliance members have remained at Beijing Capital International Airport.

After almost five years of construction, the CN¥ 80 billion (US$11.4 billion) facility features a 700,000 m^{2} (7,500,000 sq ft) terminal, the world's largest single-building airport terminal, and sits on 47 km^{2} (18 sq mi) of land. The airport won awards for best hygiene measures and best in size and region in 2020, and both awards plus Voice of the Customer in 2021 by Airports Council International.

As of 14 September 2026, Daxing Airport has handled over 1.68 million flights and served total of 237 million passengers. During peak hours, an average of one aircraft takes off or lands at Daxing Airport every minute.

== Development history ==
A third airport for Beijing was proposed in 2008 shortly after Terminal 3 is completed. By 2012, the existing Beijing Capital International Airport was running at near its full design capacity.

=== Initial proposals ===
Early media reports in September 2011 suggested that there could be up to nine runways at the new airport: eight runways for civil aviation plus one runway dedicated to military usage. It would replace Beijing Capital International Airport (which had 83 million passengers in 2013, second most in the world) as the main airport of Beijing, and be the largest in China. The airport was planned to be able to handle 120 to 200 million passengers a year, which, if capacity were fully used, would make it the world's busiest airport by passenger traffic, surpassing Hartsfield–Jackson Atlanta International Airport by far.

=== Approval for construction ===
Official approval for construction by National Development and Reform Commission on 22 December 2014. It called for an airport to be constructed in the southern part of Daxing District of Beijing, along the border of Beijing and Hebei Province. No design or plans were released due to ongoing negotiations. It was stated that it would consist of 7 runways, 6 for civilian use and 1 for military purposes. Construction has been completed as of September 2019 with a capacity of handling 75 million passengers as of 2025. The cost of construction was initially estimated to be at least 70 billion RMB (US$11.2 billion), including the 37 km (23 mi) Beijing–Xiong'an intercity railway (Beijing section), to Beijing West railway station.

=== Design and contractors ===
The airport's master plan was prepared by NACO (Netherlands Airport Consultants) and will feature a ground transportation hub providing the airport with public transportation links to high-speed rail, metro, expressways, Beijing Airport Bus routes, local buses and inter-airport transportation system. The terminal building was designed by British architects Zaha Hadid Architects, French planners ADPI and partners, and executed by the Beijing Institute of Architectural Design (BIAD). It consists of a central hub with six curved spokes. The façade was designed by XinShan Curtainwall and Beijing Institute of Architectural Design. Arup was subcontracted by Beijing Institute of Architectural Design as the fire engineering consultant, while China IPPR International Engineering was responsible for security system and baggage system designs. BuroHappold Engineering, as part of the consortium, worked with the architects to integrate engineering solutions into the design of the airport.

Hong Kong design studio Lead 8 was appointed as lead designer of the integrated service building (the sixth pier) in 2018. The terminal, according to Lead 8, will encompass "a purposeful design of work spaces, with integrated retail, dining, and entertainment options for the large number of passengers expected," with plans to incorporate interactive pet hotels, a childcare and nursery, hybrid online retail and dining, and a showroom for companies.

Other contractors involved in the project include China Electronics Engineering Design Institute, Civil Aviation Electronic Technology, The Third Rail Survey and Design Institute Group Corporation (TSDI China), Beijing City Construction Design Research General Institute and Beijing General Municipal Engineering Design & Research Institute.

Beijing TsingHua TonHeng Urban Planning and Design Institute, Central Academy of Fine Arts, Dtree, Lea-Elliot, Lighting Design Studio, and East Sign Design & Engineering were also involved in the project.

Suppliers include Xsight Systems, T-Systems, Schindler, Thales, Beijing EasySky Technology and Oasys.

=== Construction ===
In January 2019, the airport entered the final construction phase.

Construction of the airport began on 26 December 2014, and was led by chief engineer Guo Yanchi. By March 2017, the terminal had its concrete structure capped. On 23 January 2019, the first flight inspection was carried out and was completed in March.

On 30 June 2019, the airport officially finished construction and was in preparation for its September opening. The construction of the airport itself cost CN¥120bn (approximately US$17bn), with other projects in the periphery costing CN¥330bn (US$46.2bn), giving a total cost of CN¥450bn (US$63bn).

=== Opening ===
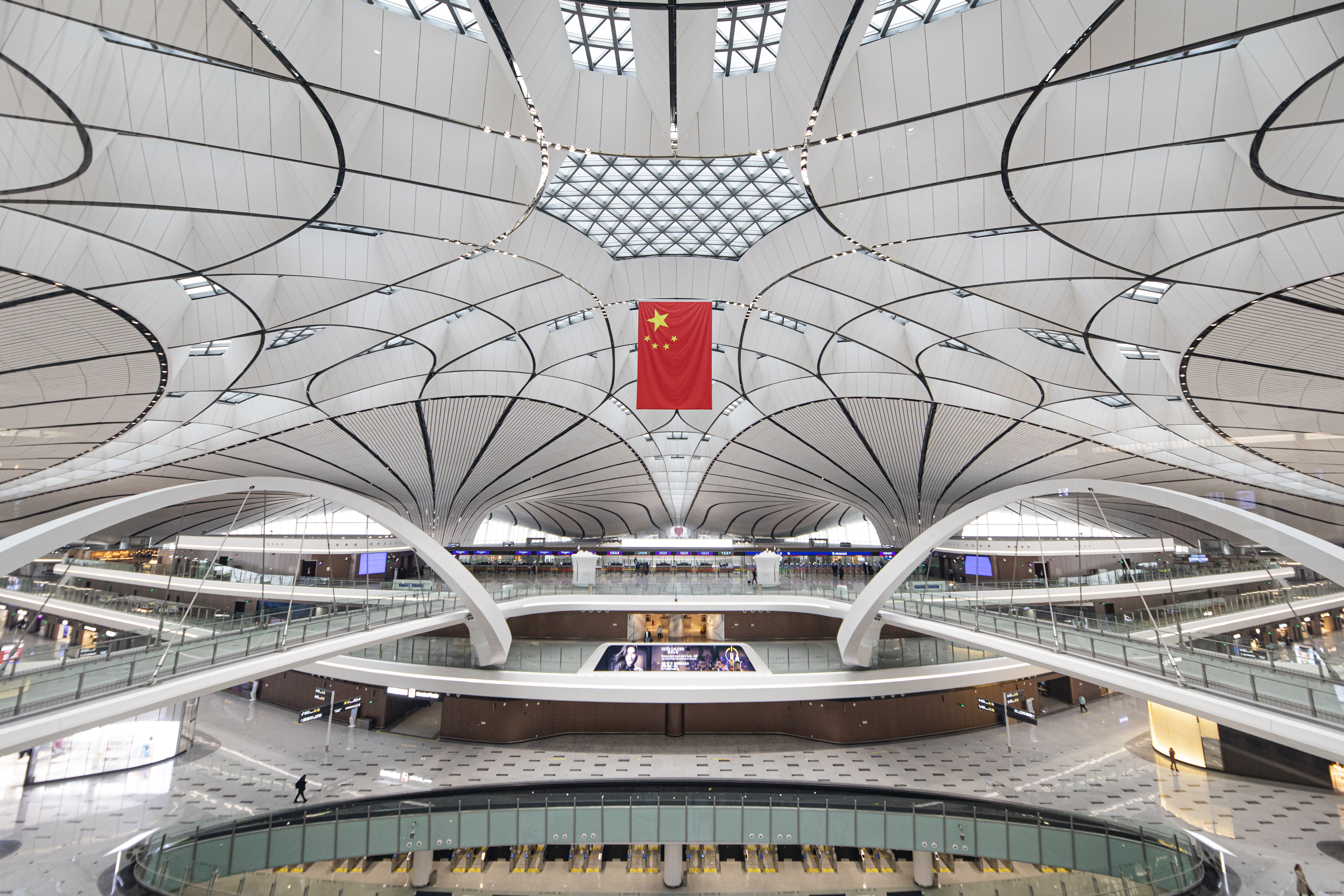
Atrium of airport where the opening ceremony was held

The airport opened on 25 September 2019—just six days before the 70th anniversary of the People's Republic of China—in a ceremony attended by the Chinese president and General Secretary of the Communist Party Xi Jinping. Inaugural flights from seven Chinese airlines began later in the afternoon, although flights operating out of the airport on the day were member-only, with the first official flight out of the airport an Airbus A380 operated by China Southern Airlines. Flights for the public began the following day on 26 September 2019. The first commercial flight landed at Beijing Daxing at 10:12 (UTC+8), 26 September 2019.

Daxing Airport is the first airport in China to be built with two control towers and four runways.

The airport serves as the hub for China United Airlines immediately after its opening and all their services have been relocated to Beijing Daxing. Others, such as China Eastern Airlines and China Southern Airlines, will also relocate.

Upon opening of the Daxing Airport, Beijing Nanyuan Airport, the oldest airport in China, closed on the same day. A military airfield will coexist in Daxing, as was the case in Nanyuan.

=== Service development ===
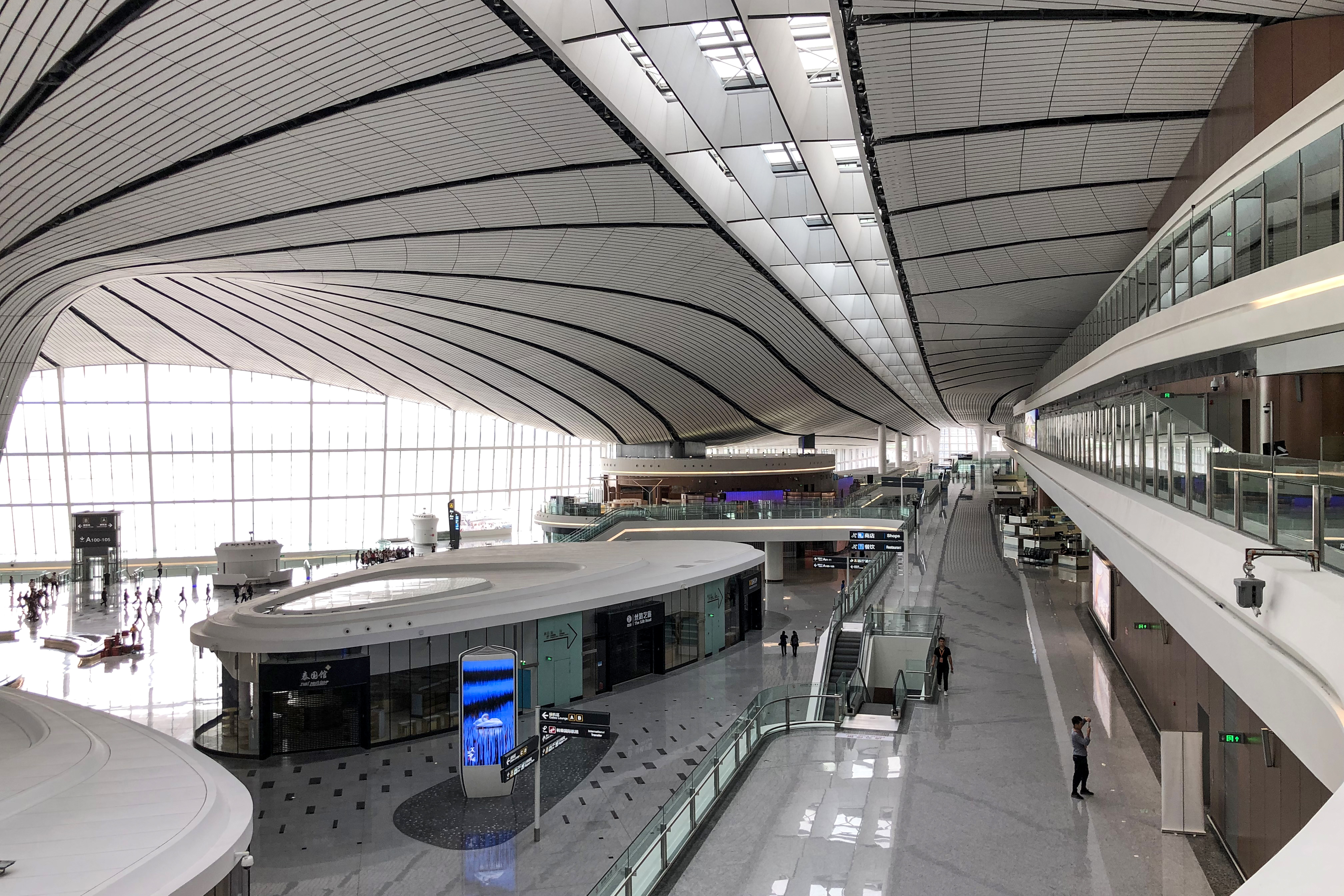
Concourse A

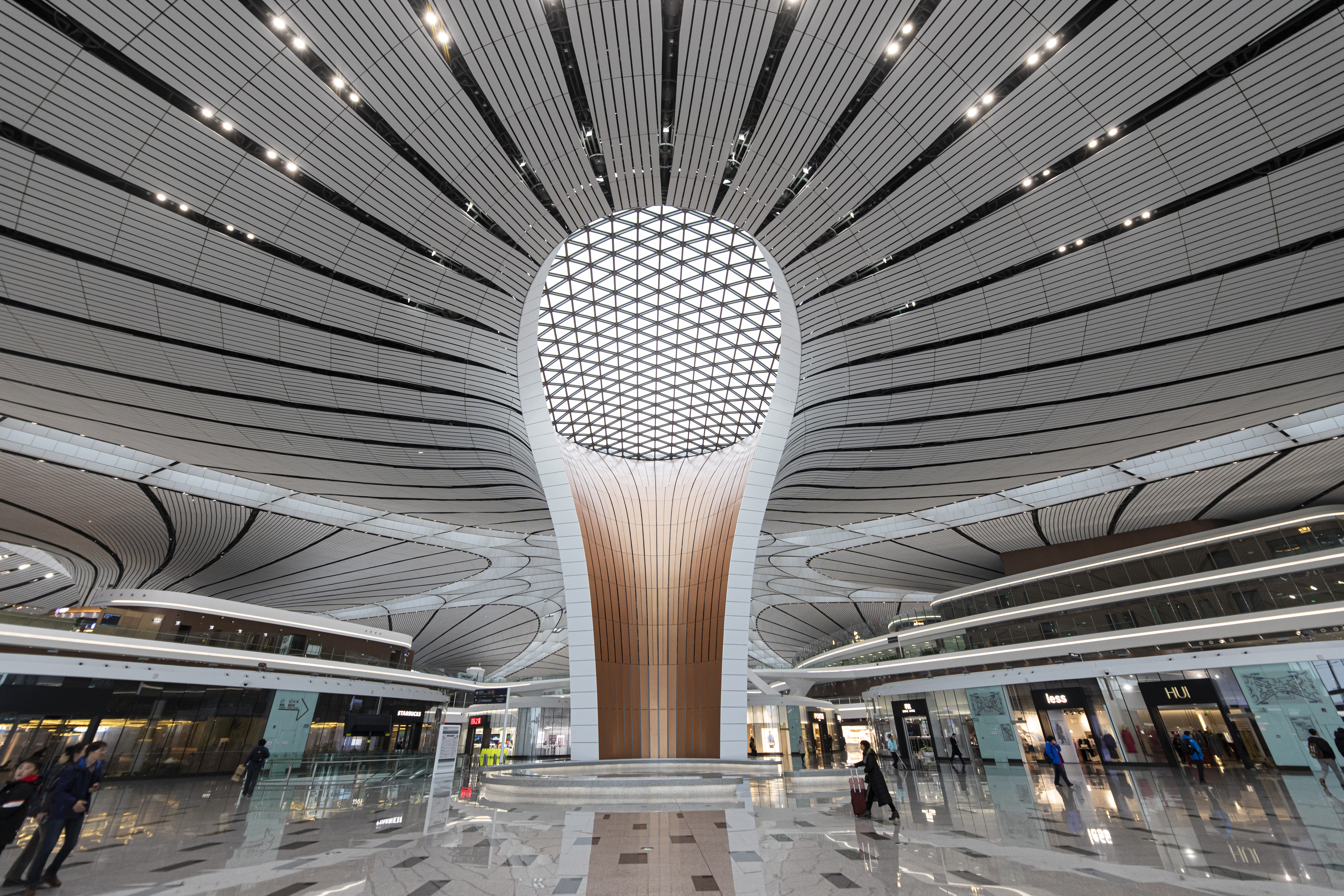
Interior of Beijing Daxing International Airport

It was initially planned for airlines of the SkyTeam alliance to be relocated to the new airport, while Star Alliance airlines would remain at Capital, effectively making both airports hubs. This was confirmed in 2016, when the Civil Aviation Administration of China announced that China Southern Airlines, China Eastern Airlines and XiamenAir along with other SkyTeam airlines would move to the new airport, while Air China and other Star Alliance carriers would remain at Capital. China Southern, China Eastern and Beijing Capital Airlines' intentions to move to Daxing were confirmed by a Xinhua report in December 2017.

Ten passenger airlines (China Southern Airlines, China United Airlines, Shanghai Airlines, Beijing Capital Airlines, Hebei Airlines, Spring Airlines, Okay Airways, Juneyao Airlines, XiamenAir and Donghai Airlines) and one cargo airline (China Postal Airlines) signed agreements with the Capital Airport Group to enter the new airport.

CAAC required each Mainland Chinese airline (other than China Postal Airlines) to serve only one Beijing-area airport following the opening of Daxing, but allowed foreign airlines (including Hong Kong, Macau and Taiwan-based airlines) to operate from both airports if they wished to do so. China Eastern Group and China Southern Group were each allocated 40% of landing slots with the remaining 20% for smaller Mainland China and international airlines. However, on 1 May 2019, this plan was changed by CAAC, with China Eastern Group relinquishing 10% of its allocated slots (to give it 30% of slots) to Air China Group in exchange for the China Eastern group continuing to operate its Shanghai-Beijing flights at Beijing Capital Airport.

SkyTeam members are slowly moving services to Daxing. XiamenAir has relocated their routes to Daxing. In June 2020, Aeroflot ended flights from Capital in favor of Daxing. Similarly, China Eastern Airlines has shifted all of its operations to Daxing except for flights to Shanghai-Hongqiao. However, their plan to launch new international routes to Paris and Tokyo at the end of March 2020 have not been realised because of the COVID-19 pandemic. Furthermore, Delta Air Lines announced their intention to move at the end of April 2020, but are currently delayed by the slow reopening of China-US flight allocations.

The Oneworld alliance announced in February 2019, that its member airlines were considering a formal co-location scheme at Daxing, particularly as many of them, now have codeshare partnerships with China Southern. Alliance members, British Airways and Malaysia Airlines moved their London-Heathrow and Kuala Lumpur to Beijing flights to Daxing. S7 Airlines moved two of its five Russian destinations to Daxing from Capital on 29 March 2020 while suspending the other three. Qatar Airways announced its intention to move to Daxing between June and August 2020 and is currently flying out of the airport. Royal Air Maroc which joined the alliance on 1 April 2020 already operates out of Daxing. However, Cathay Pacific has decided to maintain its flights at Capital. Finnair, which flew from Helsinki-to-Daxing while retaining a daily flight to Capital, has suspended both routes because of Russian airspace bans as a result of the Russian invasion of Ukraine.

Some foreign Star Alliance airlines are joining full member Air China and connecting partner Juneyao at Daxing. In January 2020, LOT Polish launched a 4-weekly flight from Warsaw, complementing its three-weekly flight to Capital. Lufthansa and Swiss International Air Lines initially announced in the same month that they would move their Frankfurt-Beijing and Zurich-Beijing flights from Capital to Daxing at the end of March 2020. However, these plans have not yet materialize because of the lingering effects on Chinese aviation brought by the COVID-19 pandemic.

On 25 October 2020, China Southern Airlines transferred all its Beijing flights to Daxing Airport.

== Airport facilities ==
Current airport layout. The grey part is the potential future development, including adding two more runways and a new terminal, and merging the current military airport runway.

The first phase of the airport project is designed with a target of 72 million passengers, 2 million tons of cargo and mail, and 620,000 aircraft movements in the long term.

Technological features of the airport include radio frequency identification for baggage tracking, geothermal heat pumps for heating and cooling, and facial recognition security access.

== Airlines and destinations ==
=== Passenger ===
Airlines	Destinations
9 Air	Guangzhou
Aeroflot	Irkutsk, Krasnoyarsk–International, Moscow–Sheremetyevo, Vladivostok
Air China	Bangkok–Suvarnabhumi, Bayannur, Bazhong, Beihai, Changchun, Changsha, Chengdu–Tianfu, Chongqing, Daqing, Frankfurt, Guangzhou, Guilin, Guiyang, Haikou, Hangzhou, Harbin, Hong Kong, Jiamusi, Jieyang, Jingdezhen, Kunming, Lanzhou, Mianyang, Milan–Malpensa, Nanchang, Nanjing, Nanning, Nantong, Ningbo, Qiqihar, Quzhou, Ruijin, Seoul–Incheon, Shanghai–Pudong, Shenyang, Shenzhen, Shiyan, Taizhou, Tongliao, Weihai, Wenzhou, Wuhai, Wuhan, Xiamen, Xi'an, Xilinhot, Yancheng, Yangzhou, Yanji, Yantai, Yibin, Yichang, Yinchuan, Yuncheng, Zhangjiajie, Zhuhai
Air Macau	Macau
Air Travel	Changsha
AirAsia	Kota Kinabalu
AirAsia X	Kuala Lumpur–International
Aurora	Khabarovsk, Vladivostok, Yuzhno-Sakhalinsk
Beijing Capital Airlines	Arxan, Bozhou, Colombo–Bandaranaike, Changsha, Chongqing, Erenhot, Haikou, Hangzhou, Kunming, Lijiang, Malé, Panzhihua, Qitai, Sanya, Tianshui, Ürümqi, Xining, Xishuangbanna, Yinchuan, Yushu; Seasonal: Lisbon
Cambodia Airways	Phnom Penh
Chengdu Airlines	Chengdu–Shuangliu
China Eastern Airlines	Bangkok–Suvarnabhumi, Beihai, Changsha, Changzhou, Chengdu–Shuangliu, Chengdu–Tianfu, Chongqing, Dali, Dalian, Denpasar, Dunhuang, Enshi, Guangzhou, Guiyang, Haikou, Hangzhou, Hanoi, Harbin, Hefei, Hong Kong, Jiagedaqi, Jiayuguan, Jiaxing, Kobe, Korla, Kuala Lumpur–International, Kunming, Lanzhou, Lijiang, Lincang, Linyi, Macau, Mangshi, Moscow–Sheremetyevo, Muscat, Nanchang, Nanjing, Ningbo, Phu Quoc, Qianjiang, Qingdao, Sanya, Seoul–Incheon, Shanghai–Hongqiao, Shanghai–Pudong, Shenzhen, Singapore, Sydney, Tacheng, Tokyo–Haneda, Ürümqi, Wuhan, Wuxi, Xiamen, Xi'an, Xining, Xishuangbanna, Yinchuan, Zhanjiang, Zhaotong, Zhuhai
China Southern Airlines	Almaty, Altay, Amsterdam, Baise, Bishkek, Changchun, Changde, Changsha, Chengdu–Shuangliu, Chengdu–Tianfu, Chongqing, Dalian, Daqing, Dhaka, Doha, Dushanbe, Fuzhou, Ganzhou, Guangzhou, Guilin, Guiyang, Haikou, Hangzhou, Harbin, Hefei, Heihe, Helsinki, Hong Kong, Istanbul, Jieyang, Jingzhou, Kashgar, Korla, Kunming, Lanzhou, London–Heathrow, Macau, Mohe, Moscow–Sheremetyevo, Nanchong, Nanning, Ningbo, Quanzhou, Riyadh, Sanya, Seoul–Gimpo, Seoul–Incheon, Shanghai–Hongqiao, Shanghai–Pudong, Shaoguan, Shenyang, Shenzhen, Tashkent, Tehran–Imam Khomeini, Tokyo–Haneda, Ürümqi, Wenshan, Wenzhou, Wuhan, Wulong, Xiamen, Xi'an, Xining, Yining, Yiwu, Yutian, Zhuhai, Zunyi–Xinzhou; Seasonal: Melbourne, Sydney
China United Airlines	Ankang, Anshan, Anshun, Baicheng, Barkol, Beihai, Bijie, Changbaishan, Chengdu–Tianfu, Chenzhou, Chizhou, Dongying, Foshan, Fuzhou, Haikou, Hailar, Hangzhou, Hanzhong, Harbin, Huaihua, Huizhou, Jieyang, Kunming, Kuqa, Lanzhou, Lüliang, Luzhou, Meizhou, Ningbo, Ordos, Qiqihar, Quanzhou, Sanya, Shanghai–Hongqiao, Shanghai–Pudong, Shenzhen, Songyuan, Tongren, Turpan, Ulanhot, Ürümqi, Vientiane, Vladivostok, Wenzhou, Wuzhou, Xiamen, Xiangxi, Xingyi, Xining, Yanji, Yichun (Heilongjiang), Yiwu, Yongzhou, Yueyang, Yulin (Shaanxi), Zhangye, Zhanjiang, Zhoushan, Zhuhai
Chongqing Airlines	Chongqing, Diqing
Colorful Guizhou Airlines	Guiyang
Dalian Airlines	Dalian
Donghai Airlines	Changzhi, Shenzhen, Yichang
Etihad Airways	Abu Dhabi
Hebei Airlines	Changsha, Chengdu–Tianfu, Chongqing, Guilin, Guiyang, Guyuan, Hailar, Jinchang, Kunming, Longnan, Nanning, Ningbo, Qingyang, Ürümqi, Yinchuan, Zhalantun, Zhuhai, Zunyi–Xinzhou
Himalaya Airlines	Kathmandu
HK Express	Hong Kong
Hong Kong Airlines	Hong Kong
Hunnu Air	Ulaanbaatar
Jeju Air	Jeju
Jiangxi Air	Nanchang
Juneyao Air	Jeju, Shanghai–Hongqiao
Malaysia Airlines	Kuala Lumpur–International
Qanot Sharq	Tashkent
Qatar Airways	Doha
Qingdao Airlines	Xichang, Xishuangbanna
Royal Air Maroc	Casablanca
Royal Air Philippines	Charter: Kalibo
Royal Brunei Airlines	Bandar Seri Begawan
S7 Airlines	Irkutsk, Khabarovsk, Novosibirsk, Vladivostok, Yakutsk
Saudia	Dammam, Jeddah, Riyadh
SereneAir	Islamabad
Shanghai Airlines	Shanghai–Hongqiao
Singapore Airlines	Singapore
Spring Airlines	Jeju
T'way Air	Seoul–Incheon
Thai Lion Air	Bangkok–Don Mueang
Thai VietJet Air	Bangkok–Suvarnabhumi
Ural Airlines	Irkutsk, Vladivostok, Yekaterinburg
Uzbekistan Airways	Tashkent
VietJet Air	Hanoi, Ho Chi Minh City
Vietnam Airlines	Hanoi, Ho Chi Minh City
XiamenAir	Changsha, Chongqing, Doha, Fuzhou, Haikou, Hangzhou, Jiayuguan, Liancheng, Luzhou, Quanzhou, Sanming, Sanya, Shanghai–Pudong, Shenzhen, Ürümqi, Vientiane, Wuyishan, Xiamen, Yinchuan

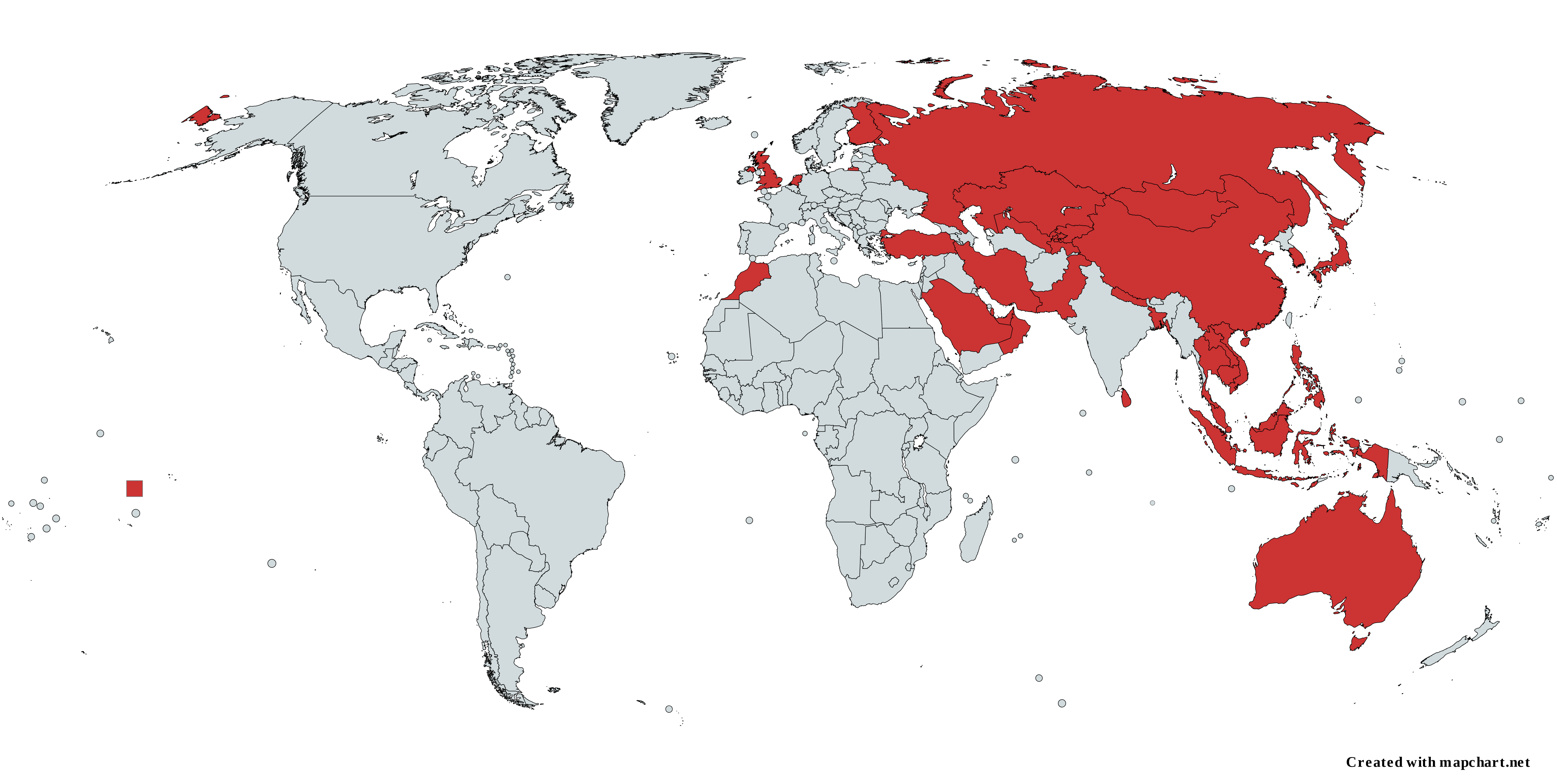
Beijing Daxing International Airport destinations as of March 2026.

== Ground transportation ==
The airport is linked to the city through various means of transportation, and a ground transportation center was constructed beneath the terminal building for this purpose. Two underground railway stations (for Beijing–Xiong'an intercity railway and Intercity Railway Connector) and three metro stations (Daxing Airport Express, Line 20 (Line R4) and another planned metro line) were built beneath the terminal building. Currently, only one of the metro lines (Daxing Airport Express) and one of the railway lines (Beijing–Xiong'an intercity railway) are in operation. The airport is also served by a highway system including Beijing Daxing Airport Expressway and Beijing Daxing Airport North Line Expressway connecting the airport and Beijing city.

=== Intercity rail ===
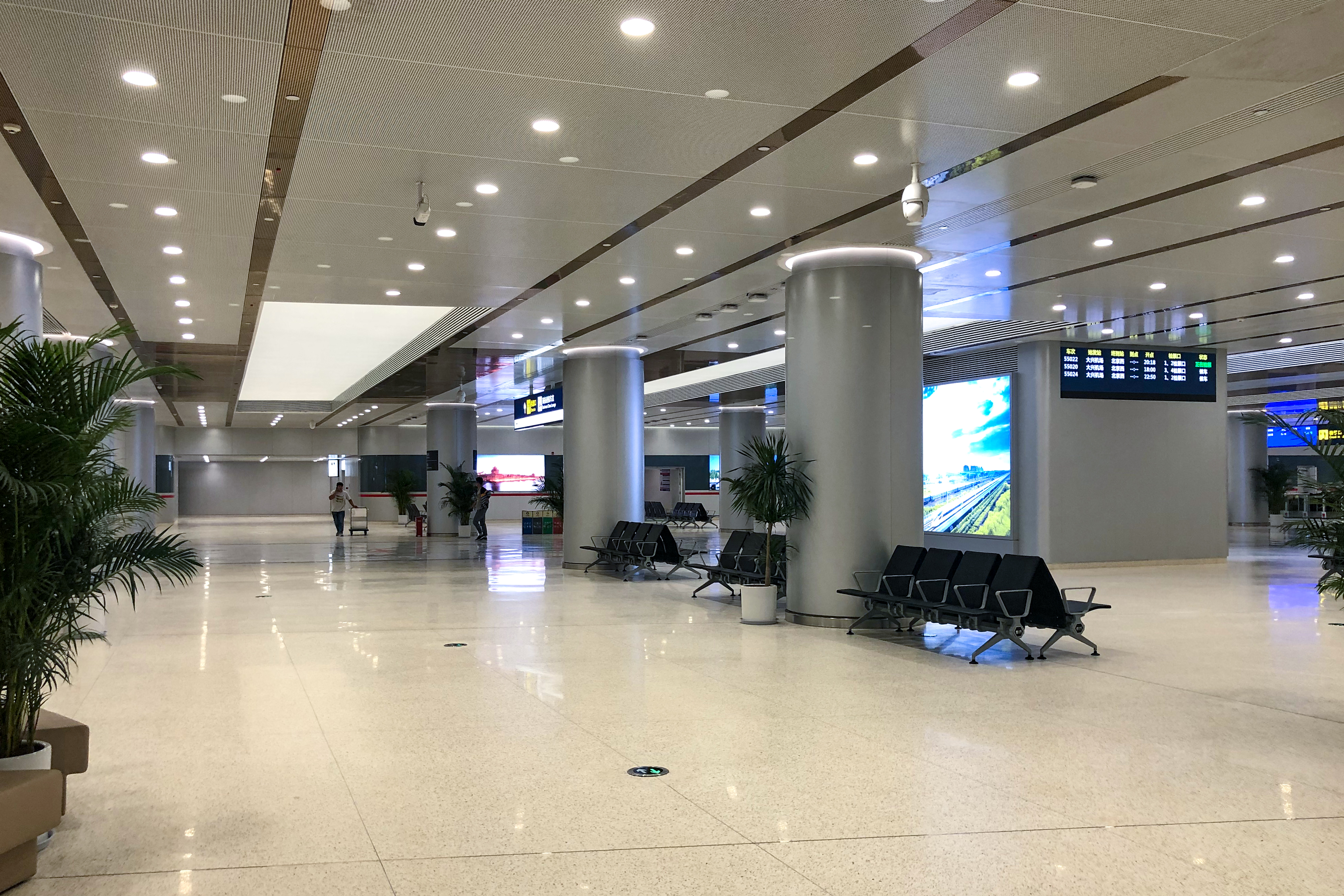
Waiting room of Intercity Railway Daxing Airport Station

A high-speed railway service, the Beijing–Xiong'an intercity railway starts from Beijing West railway station. It will connect the urban area of Beijing, Daxing District of Beijing, Bazhou, and Xiong'an to the new airport. The section between the airport to Beijing will operate at speeds of 250 km/h (160 mph) and the section between the airport to Xiong'an will operate at speeds of 350 km/h (220 mph). The airport-to-Beijing section was opened on 26 September 2019, while the airport-to-Xiong'an section is expected to open in late 2020. It will take 28 minutes from Beijing West railway station to the new airport.

Another intercity railway, the Intercity Railway Connector, will connect Langfang, Yizhuang, Beijing Sub-administrative Center in Tongzhou District and Beijing Capital International Airport to Daxing Airport. Phase I of the intercity railway connector (Daxing Airport to Langfang East railway station) is under construction. Phase 1 of the railway will be finished in December 2022. The speed will be 200 km/h (120 mph).

Another high-speed railway service, the Tianjin–Daxing Airport intercity railway, will connect Tianjin West railway station with Daxing Airport. Operation is projected to commence in the first half of 2023. The speed will be 250 km/h (160 mph).

=== Subway ===
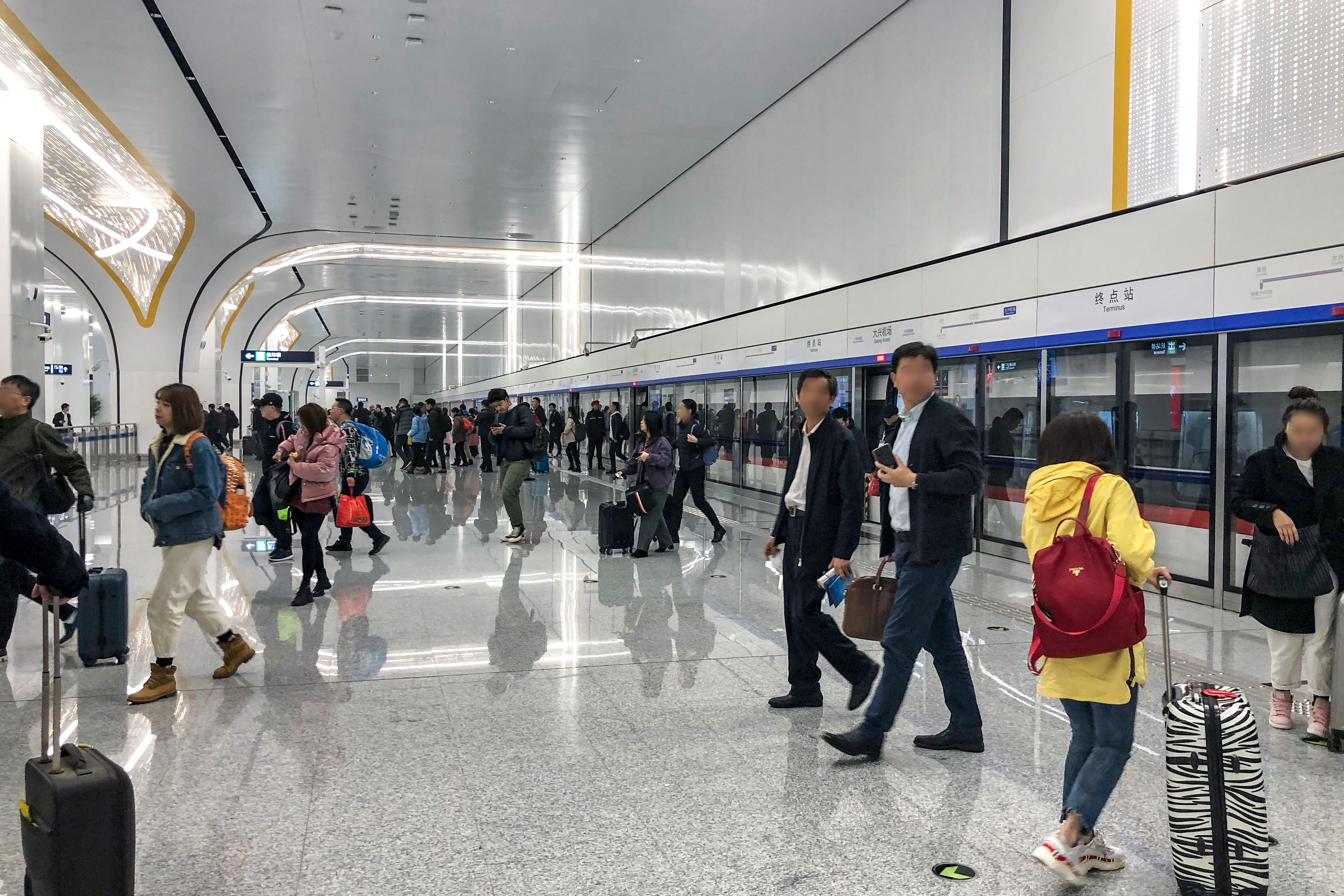
Platform of the subway station

The Daxing Airport Express of the Beijing Subway connects the airport to the urban area of Beijing and began operation on 26 September 2019. The line links Caoqiao station on Line 10 to the airport. Initially, only the Caoqiao-to-airport segment was opened, with a northern extension to Lize Shangwuqu scheduled to begin construction in 2020 and finish in June 2027. A southern extension of the line, also known as Line R1 of Xiong'an Rail Transit (or Xiong'an to Daxing Airport Express), from Daxing Airport to Xiong'an Terminal is under construction.

== Statistics ==
Below is the passenger data and development for Beijing Daxing International Airport as of 2025:

Passenger statistics at Beijing Daxing International Airport
Year	Total passenger	Passenger % change
2019^{1}	3,135,074	Steady
2020	16,091,449	▲413.3%
2021	25,051,012	▲35.7%
2022	10,277,623	▼ -59.0%
2023	39,410,776	▲283.5
2024	49,441,029	▲25.5%
2025	53,618,949	▲8.5%

^1: 2019 statistics correspond to the last four months of 2019 since the opening of the airport.

== Climate ==
Climate data for Beijing Daxing International Airport (2020 – 2023 normals, extremes 2019–present)
Month	Jan	Feb	Mar	Apr	May	Jun	Jul	Aug	Sep	Oct	Nov	Dec	Year
Record high °C (°F)	13.0 (55.4)	24.0 (75.2)	27.0 (80.6)	33.0 (91.4)	36.0 (96.8)	42.0 (107.6)	40.0 (104.0)	38.0 (100.4)	37.0 (98.6)	31.0 (87.8)	20.0 (68.0)	14.0 (57.2)	42.0 (107.6)
Daily mean °C (°F)	−3.4 (25.9)	0.6 (33.1)	8.1 (46.6)	15.0 (59.0)	20.8 (69.4)	25.9 (78.6)	27.2 (81.0)	26.5 (79.7)	21.8 (71.2)	13.4 (56.1)	5.4 (41.7)	−3.2 (26.2)	13.2 (55.7)
Record low °C (°F)	−23.0 (−9.4)	−18.0 (−0.4)	−9.0 (15.8)	−3.0 (26.6)	3.0 (37.4)	11.0 (51.8)	15.0 (59.0)	12.0 (53.6)	6.0 (42.8)	−2.0 (28.4)	−13.0 (8.6)	−22.0 (−7.6)	−23.0 (−9.4)
Average relative humidity (%)	54	52	49	44	53	54	73	77	71	60	58	54	58
Source: Weather archive in Beijing Daxing (airport), METAR

== See also ==
- List of busiest airports by cargo traffic
- List of busiest airports by passenger traffic
- List of the busiest airports in China
- List of airports in China
- Civil aviation in China
