= Beijing–Xiong'an intercity railway =

Railway line in China

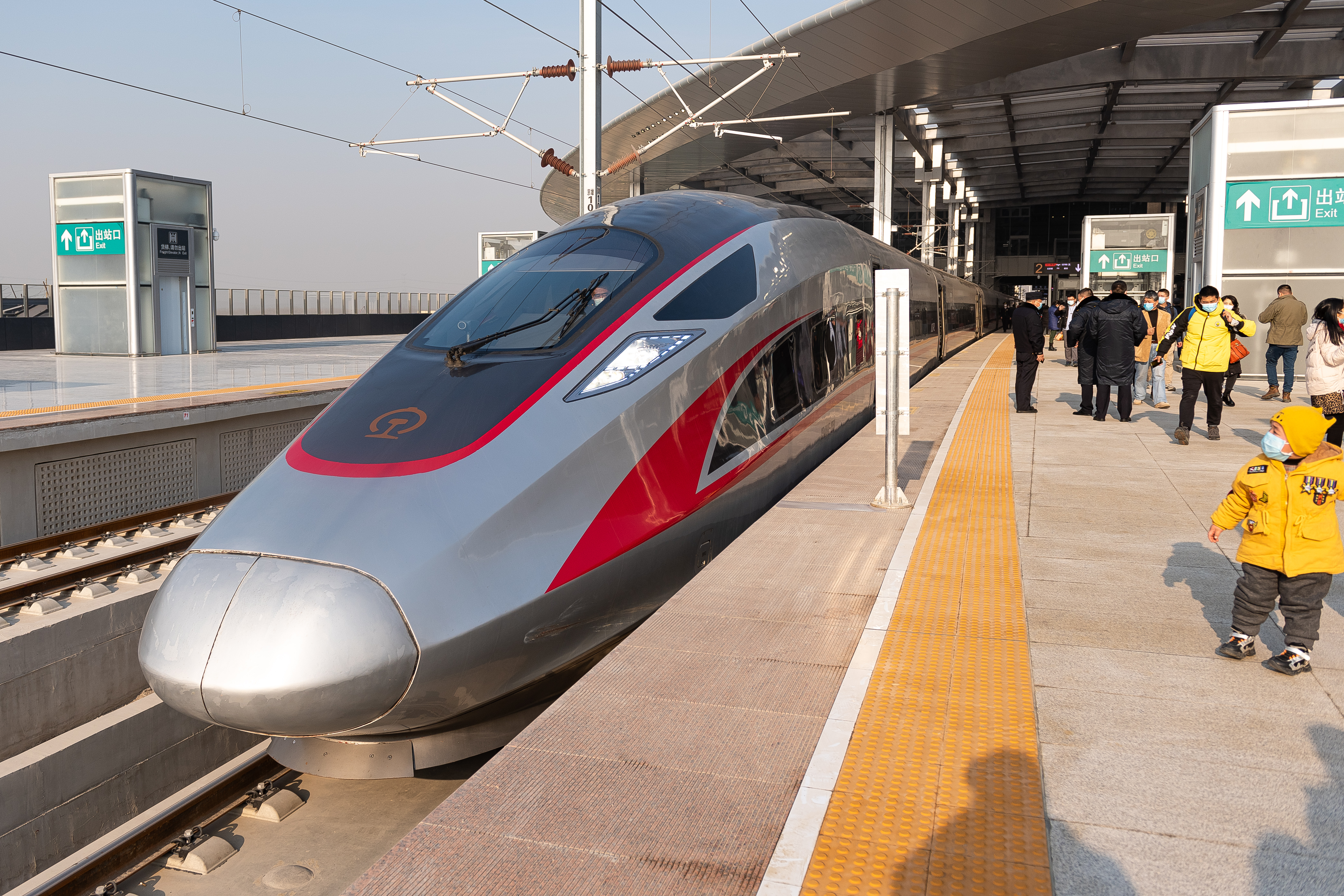
- Beijing–Xiong'an intercity train at Xiong'an railway station

Overview
- Native name: 京雄城际铁路
- Status: Operational
- Owner: China Railway
- Locale: Beijing; Hebei province
- Termini: Beijing West; Xiong'an
- Stations: 6

Service
- Type: High-speed rail
- System: China Railway High-speed
- Operator(s): CR Beijing
- Rolling stock: CR400AF

History
- Opened: September 26, 2019; 5 years ago

Technical
- Line length: 92.03 km (57.18 mi)
- Track gauge: 1,435 mm (4 ft 8 1/2 in) standard gauge
- Operating speed: 250–350 km/h (160–220 mph)

Beijing–Xiong'an intercity railway
- Simplified Chinese: 京雄城际铁路
- Traditional Chinese: 京雄城際鐵路
Transcriptions
Standard Mandarin
- Hanyu Pinyin: Jīng-Xióng chéngjì tiělù

The Beijing–Xiong'an intercity railway or Jingxiong intercity railway (Chinese: 京雄城际铁路; pinyin: Jīng-Xióng chéngjì tiělù) is a high-speed rail that connects Beijing and Xiong'an.

It is one of two lines connecting the urban area of Beijing to the Beijing Daxing International Airport. The other line is the Daxing Airport Express of the Beijing Subway.

== Opening time ==
The section from Beijing West to the Daxing Airport was opened on September 26, 2019 and the airport to Xiong'an section opened on December 27, 2020.

== Speed ==
The section between Beijing West and the airport operates at speeds of 250 km/h (160 mph), while the section between the airport and Xiong'an allows speeds of 350 km/h (220 mph).

It takes 28 minutes to travel from Beijing West railway station to Daxing Airport.

== Stations ==
Station Name	Chinese	Total distance (km)	Travel Time	Railway transfers & Airports	Metro transfers	Platforms	Tracks served by platform	Location
Beijing West; Beijingxi	北京西			Sub-Central	7 9			Fengtai District, Beijing
Beijing Daxing (Note: Beijing Daxing railway station is located near the Huangcun railway station.)	北京大兴				Daxing (adjacent station - Huangcun Railway Station (subway station))			Daxing District, Beijing
Daxing Airport	大兴机场			PKX	Daxing Airport			Guangyang District, Langfang, Hebei (Note: The actual location of Daxing Airport railway station.)
Gu'an East; Gu'andong	固安东							Gu'an County, Langfang, Hebei
Bazhou North; Bazhoubei	霸州北							Bazhou, Langfang, Hebei
Xiong'an	雄安							Xiong County, Xiong'an New Area, Hebei
