= Langfang North railway station =

Railway station under construction in Langfang Development Area

Langfang North 廊坊北
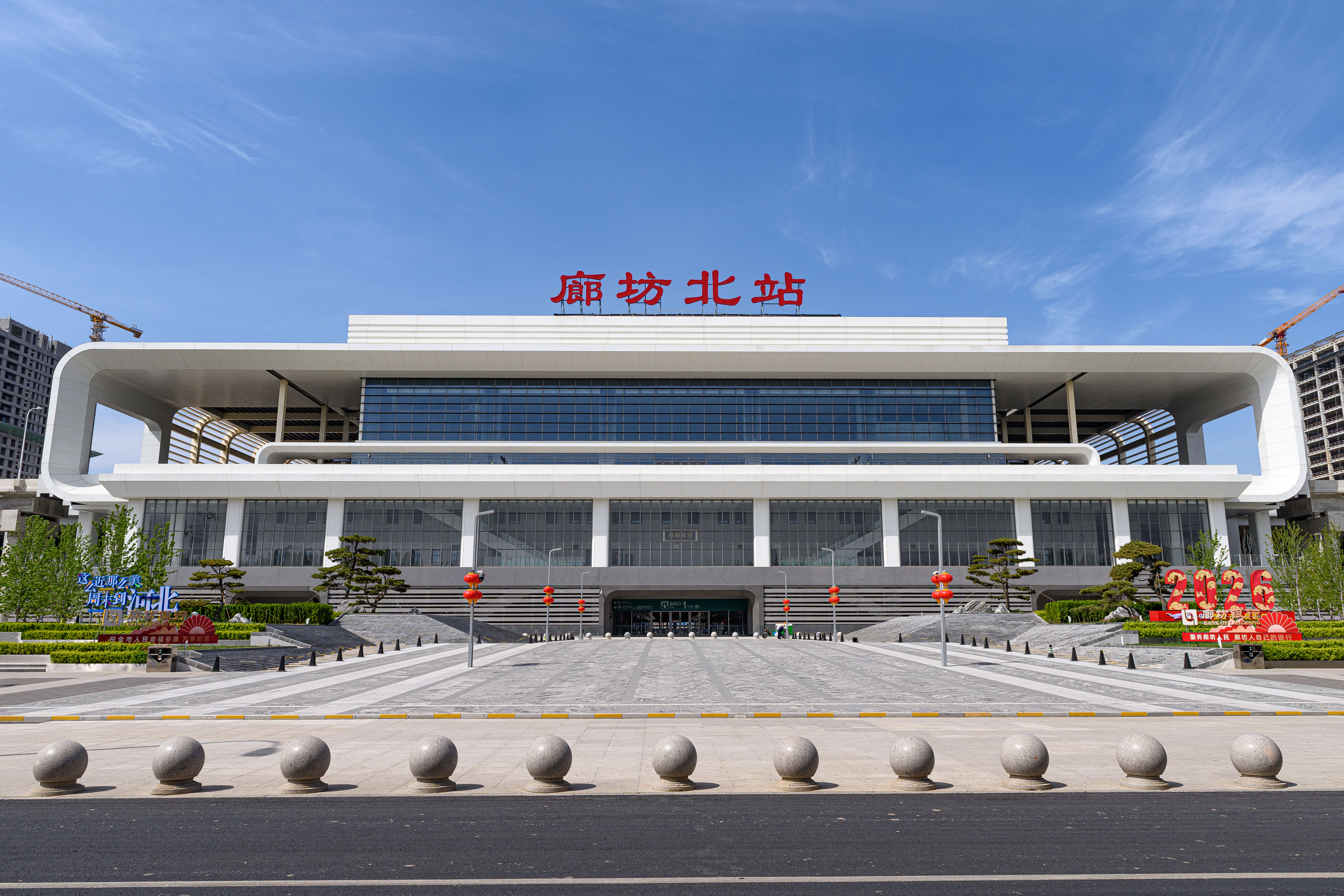

General information
- Location: Houwanggezhuang Village (后王各庄村), Langfang Development Area, Guangyang District, Langfang, Hebei; China
- Operator: China Railway Beijing Group; China Railway Corporation
- Line: Huaixing intercity railway

Other information
- Station code: 21165 (TMIS)

History
- Opened: December 28, 2024; 19 months ago
- Former names: Langfang East (廊坊东), Langfang Kaifaqu (廊坊开发区)
Location
- Location within Hebei

Langfang North railway station (Chinese: 廊坊北站; pinyin: Lángfángběi zhàn) is a railway station in Houwanggezhuang Village, Langfang Development Area, Guangyang District, Langfang, Hebei Province. It is the eastern terminus of the initial section of the Huaixing intercity railway. The station opened in December 2024.

== Name ==
The station was known as Langfang East railway station (廊坊东站) during construction. In 2022, it was planned to be renamed as Langfang Development Area railway station (廊坊开发区站), but following further discussions, was officially renamed as Langfang North railway station in December 2023 (廊坊北站).
