= Xiong'an railway station =

Railway station in Hebei, China

Xiong'an 雄安
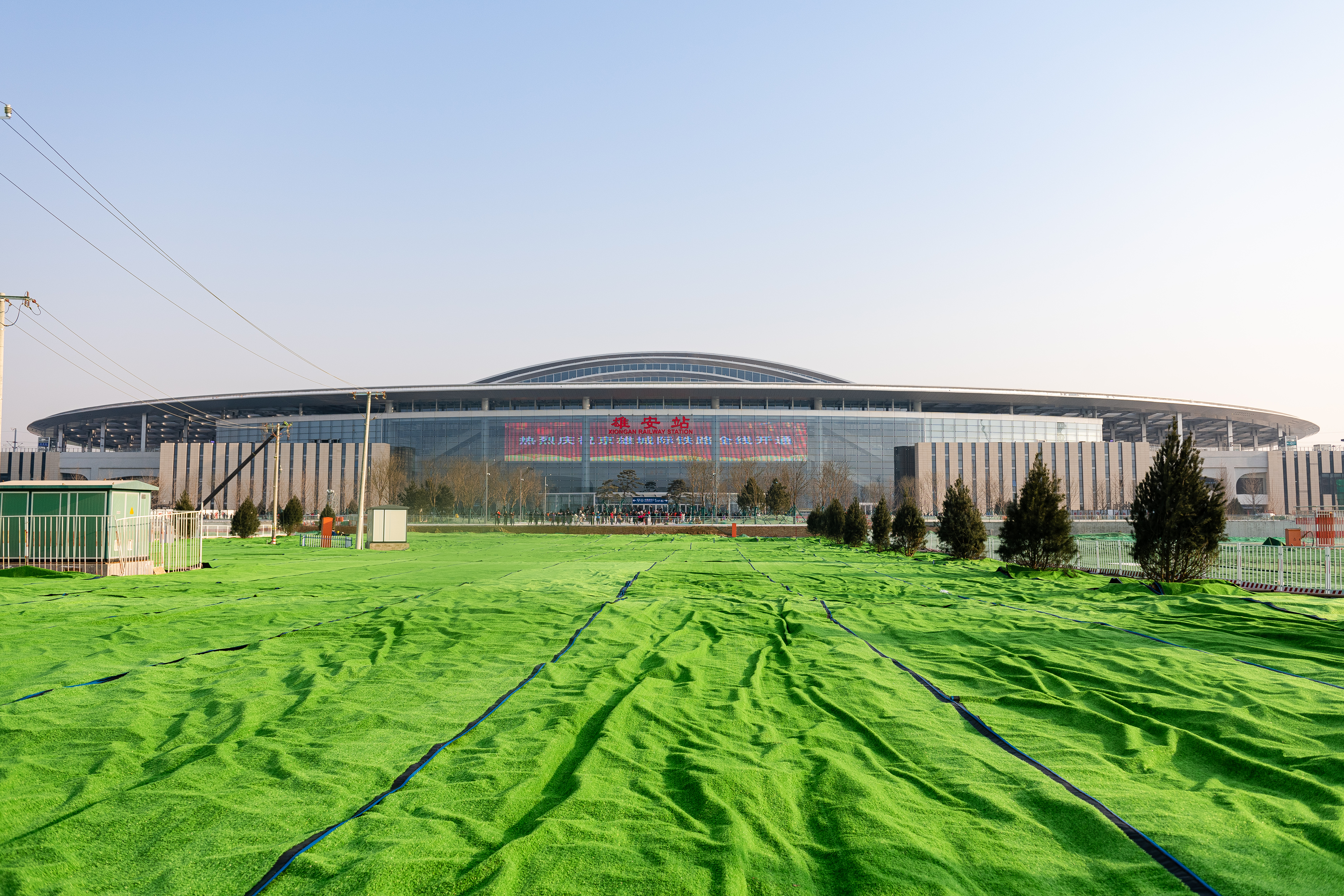
- West facade

Chinese name
- Chinese: 雄安站
Transcriptions
Standard Mandarin
- Hanyu Pinyin: Xióngān Zhàn

General information
- Location: Guanlimahu Village and Zuogezhuang Village; Zangang Town, Xiong County (Xiong'an New Area), Hebei; China
- Coordinates: 39.055749°N 116.153230°E
- Lines: Beijing–Xiong'an intercity railway Beijing–Shangqiu high-speed railway (under construction); Xiong'an–Xinzhou high-speed railway (planned); Tianjin–Xiong'an intercity railway (planned)

Other information
- Station code: 21164 (TMIS); IQP (telegram); XAN (pinyin)

History
- Opened: 27 December 2020

Services
Preceding station	China Railway High-speed	Following station
Bazhou North towards Beijing West	Beijing–Xiong'an intercity railway	Terminus
Location

Xiong'an railway station (Chinese: 雄安站) is a railway station in Xiong County, Xiong'an New Area, Hebei, China. It opened on 27 December 2020.

== Design ==
This station covers a total construction area of 130,000 square metres (1,400,000 sq ft), which has been described as the largest train station in Asia. This station project is collaborated designed by AREP in 2017, China Railway Design Corporation, China Architecture Design & Research Group, BMEDI and China Academy of Urban Planning & Design. The construction began on August 29, 2018 by China Railway 12th Bureau Group, China Railway Construction Engineering Group, China Construction Third Engineering Bureau and finished in the end of 2020.

The concept design is inspired by the water culture of Baiyang Lake. The oval waterdrop shape symbolised a dewdrop on a lotus or a gushing spring. Undulating layers on the roof look like ripple on the water surface. The facade design uses element of the traditional Chinese grand hall showing Chinese cultural genes.

It has a solar panel array on its roof with an installed capacity of 6 MW.

== Structure ==
The station hall of Xiong'an has three floors overground and two floors underground. Among the floors, the ground floor is waiting hall and bus terminus and the second floor is the platform floor for railway and reserved Xiong'an Rail Transit Line R1 & R2. The third floor is the elevated waiting hall. The basement first floor is for the future business development, and the basement second floor is for the reserved metro line M1.

3F
elevated waiting hall

(open soon)

check-in gate (1-19C), washrooms
2F
platform floor
Platform 1-19, Platform for R1 & R2
Mezzanine
exit passage
Exit1-4, pay upon arrival, railway transfer
paid erea
business for passengers
unpaid area
sightseeing corridor
shuttle bus station
boarding for Xiong County & Anxin County shuttle bus
1F
ground waiting hall
check-in gate (1-19A/b), washrooms, 12306 service center,

business & military & priority waiting area

entrance passage
entrance, security check, identity check
integrated service center
integrated service center (ticket office)
east plaza (open soon)
bus terminus, taxi stand, parking, drop-off area
west plaza
west plaza
B1
traffic interchange

(open soon)

interchange hall, metro station hall
commercial development area

(open soon)

reserved business area
B2
metro platform floor
Metro line M1 platform

== Future ==
The station will also be connected to the Xiong'an Rail Transit system in the future. It is designed to accommodate high-speed rail and take 20 minutes to go to Beijing Daxing International Airport, as well as around 30 minutes to reach the train station at Beijing and Tianjin, and 60 minutes to get to Shijiazhuang.
