= Tianjin–Daxing Airport intercity railway =

Railway line in Hebei, China

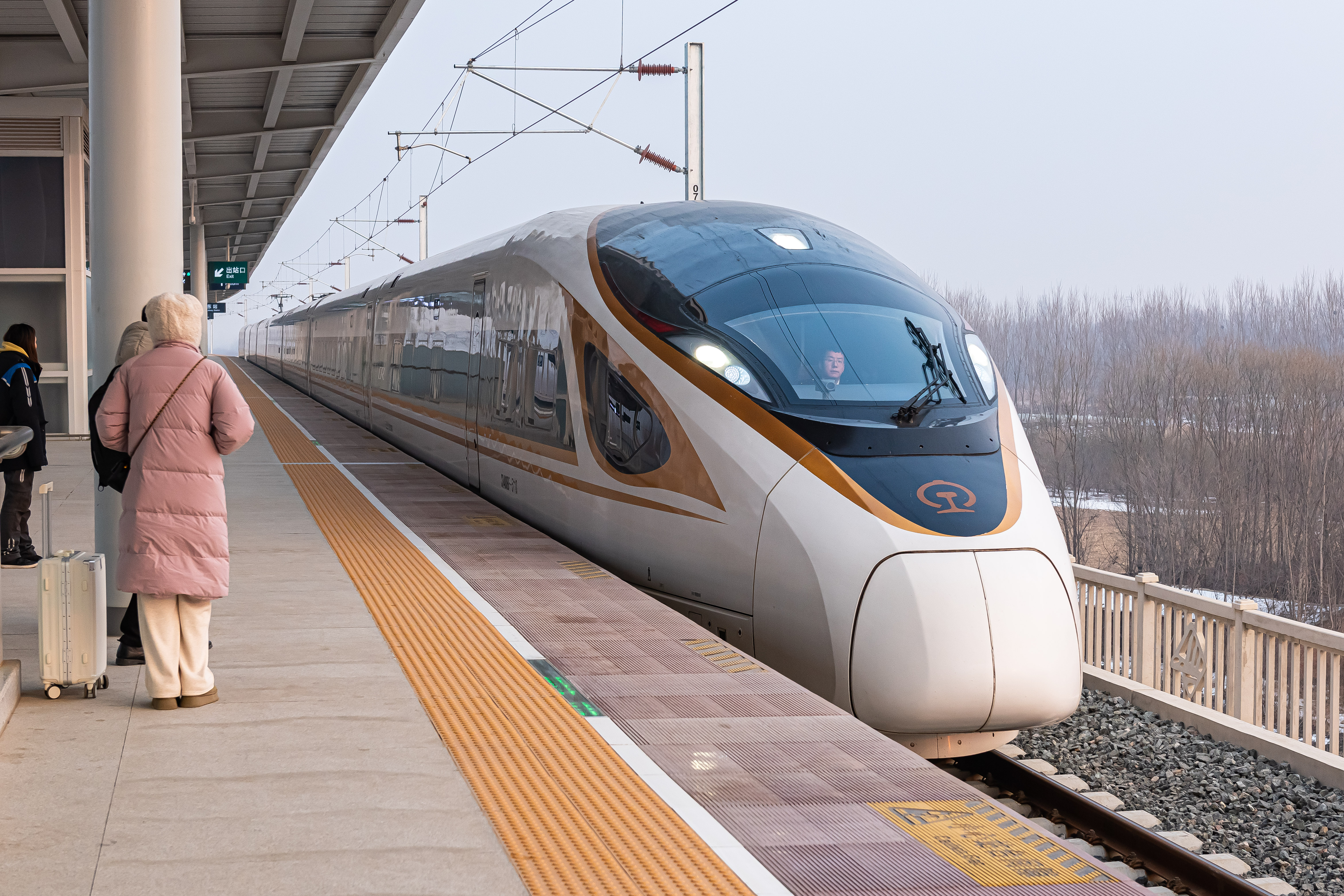
- A service at Yongqing East railway station

Overview
- Native name: 津兴城际铁路
- Status: Operational
- Termini: Daxing Airport; Tianjin West
- Stations: 6

Service
- Type: High-speed rail

History
- Opened: 18 December 2023

Technical
- Line length: 101 km (63 mi) (full service); 47 km (29 mi) (Gu'an East–Shengfang section)
- Track gauge: 1,435 mm (4 ft 8 1/2 in) standard gauge
- Operating speed: 250 km/h (160 mph)

The Tianjin–Daxing Airport intercity railway (Chinese: 津兴城际铁路; pinyin: Jīn–Xīng Chéngjì Tiělù) is a high-speed railway line in Langfang, Hebei, China. It opened on 18 December 2023.

== Stations ==
Station Name	Chinese	Distance km
Daxing Airport	大兴机场	
Gu'an East (Gu'andong)	固安东	
Yongqing East (Yongqingdong)	永清东	
Anci	安次	
Shengfang	胜芳	
Tianjin West (Tianjinxi)	天津西	
