= Baiyangdian railway station =

Railway station in Baoding, Hebei, China

Baiyangdian 白洋淀
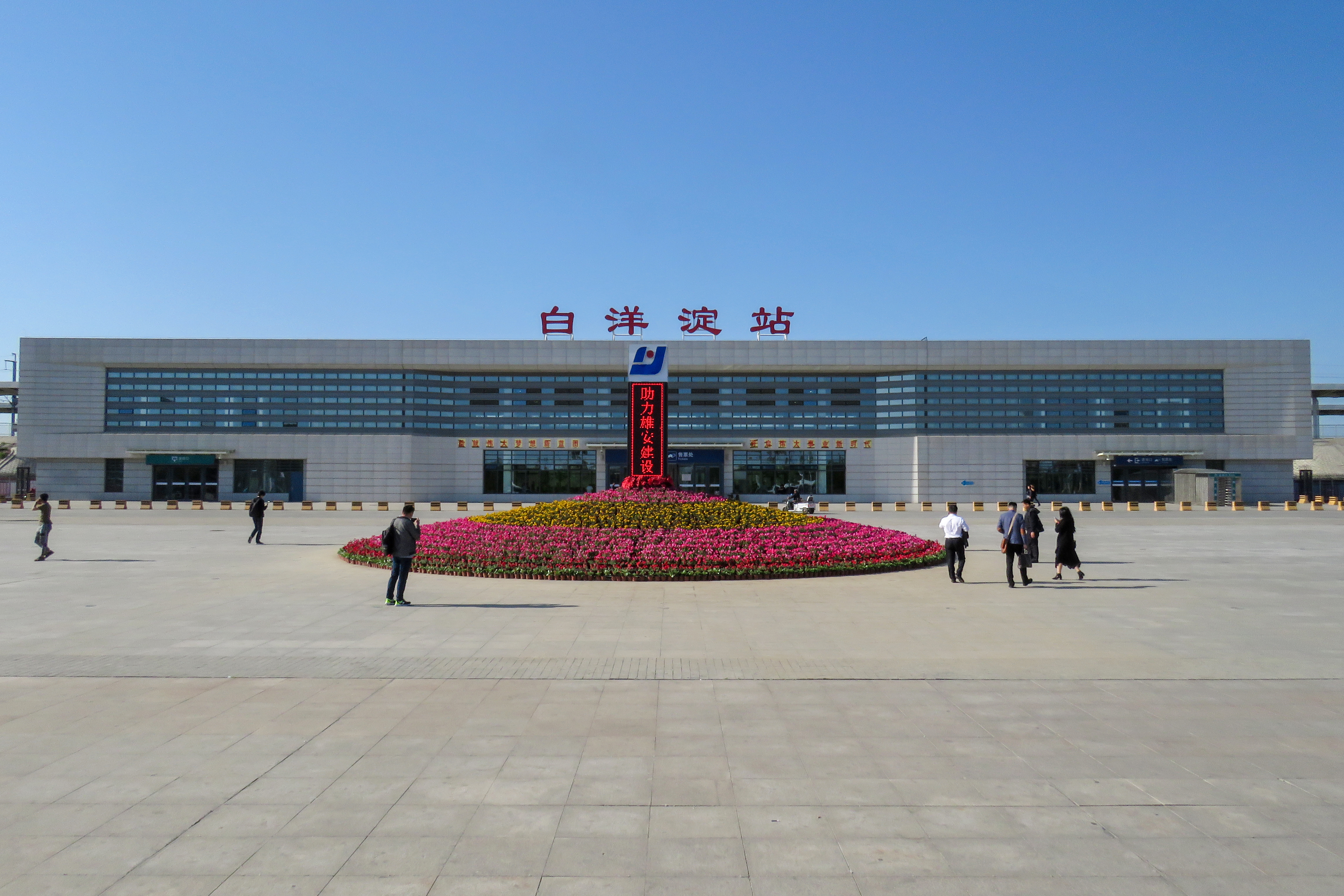

General information
- Location: Rongcheng County, Xiong'an New Area, Baoding, Hebei; China
- Coordinates: 39°4′7″N 115°52′7″E
- Operator: CR Beijing
- Line: Tianjin–Baoding intercity railway
- Platforms: 2
- Tracks: 4

Other information
- Station code: 20387 (TMIS code); FWP (telegraph code); BYD (Pinyin code)

History
- Opened: 28 December 2015

Services
Preceding station	China Railway High-speed	Following station
Baigou towards Tianjin West	Tianjin–Baoding intercity railway	Xushui towards Baoding
Location
- Location within Hebei Location within China

Baiyangdian railway station (Chinese: 白洋淀站; pinyin: Báiyángdiàn zhàn) is a station Tianjin–Baoding intercity railway in Rongcheng County, Xiong'an New Area, Baoding, Hebei. The station is named after the Baiyangdian (Baiyang Lake).

== History ==
The station was opened on 28 December 2015, together with the Tianjin–Baoding intercity railway.
