= Baigou railway station =

Railway station in Baoding, Hebei, China

Baigou 白沟
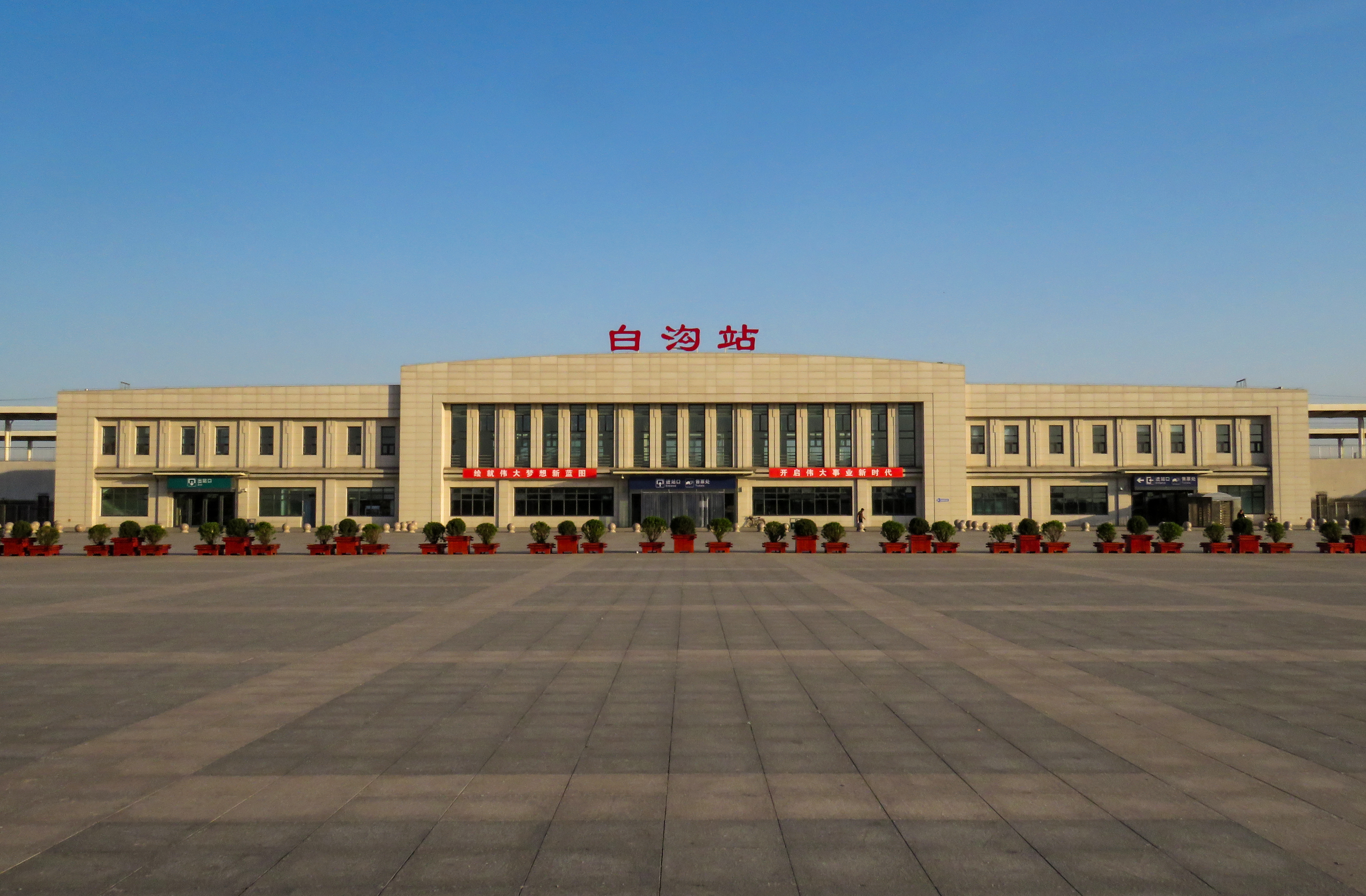

General information
- Location: Xiong County, Xiong'an New Area, Baoding, Hebei; China
- Coordinates: 39°05′13″N 116°05′34″E
- Operator: CR Beijing
- Line: Tianjin–Baoding intercity railway
- Platforms: 2
- Tracks: 6

Other information
- Station code: 20385 (TMIS code); FEP (telegraph code); BGO (Pinyin code)

History
- Opened: 28 December 2015

Services
Preceding station	China Railway High-speed	Following station
Bazhou West towards Tianjin West	Tianjin–Baoding intercity railway	Baiyangdian towards Baoding
Location
- Location within Hebei Location within China

Baigou railway station (Chinese: 白沟站; pinyin: Báigōu zhàn) is a station on the Tianjin–Baoding intercity railway in Xiong County, Xiong'an New Area, Baoding, Hebei.

== Station layout ==
2F	Side platform
2F	Platform 1	Tianjin–Baoding intercity railway towards Tianjin West (Bazhou West) →
2F	Through track	Tianjin–Baoding intercity railway towards Tianjin West (non-stop) →
2F	Through track	Tianjin–Baoding intercity railway towards Tianjin West (non-stop) →
2F	Through track	← Tianjin–Baoding intercity railway towards Baoding (non-stop)
2F	Through track	← Tianjin–Baoding intercity railway towards Baoding (non-stop)
2F	Platform 2	← Tianjin–Baoding intercity railway towards Baoding (Baiyangdian)
2F	Side platform
1F	Waiting room	Ticket offices, ticket vending machines, ticket gates, waiting areas, exits

== History ==
The station was opened on 28 December 2015, together with the Tianjin–Baoding intercity railway.
