= Bohai Economic Rim =

Economic region in China

Coordinates: 38°42′N 118°6′E

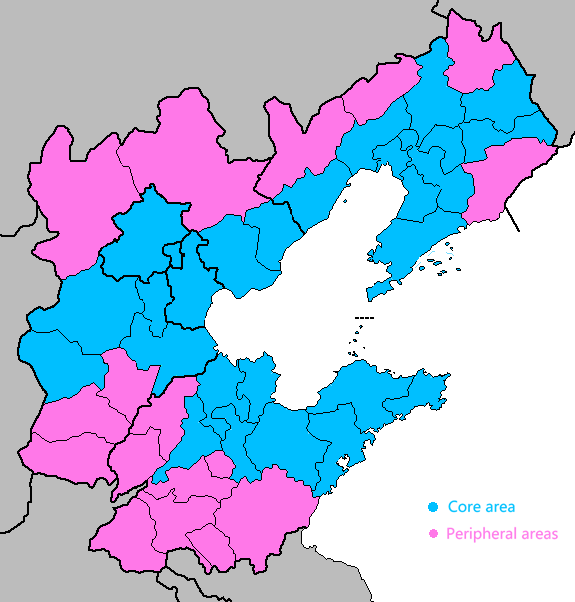
Cities in Bohai Economic Rim

China's three major economic zones

The Bohai Economic Rim (BER) or Bohai Bay Economic Rim (BBER) is the economic region surrounding Tianjin (Tientsin). It also includes areas in Hebei, Liaoning and Shandong surrounding the Bohai Sea. This region has undergone major economic and infrastructural changes and is an emerging economic powerhouse of North China, rivaling both the Pearl River Delta in southern China and the Yangtze River Delta in eastern China.

== Economy ==
The Bohai Economic Rim has traditionally been involved in heavy industry and manufacturing. Tianjin's strengths have always been in aviation, logistics and shipping. Beijing complements this with strong petrochemical, education and R&D sectors. The area is becoming a significant growth cluster for the automobile, electronics, and petrochemical sectors, especially with Shenyang's automotive industry, software and aircraft, Dalian attracting foreign investments in manufacturing and Qingdao for its health services.

The Chinese central government has made it a priority to integrate all the cities in the Bohai Bay rim and foster economic development. This includes building an advanced communications network, better highways, increased education and scientific resources as well as tapping natural resources off the Bohai rim.

In recent decades, petroleum and natural gas deposits have been discovered in Bohai Sea.

== Transport ==
=== Air ===
Major airports:

- Beijing Capital International Airport
- Beijing Daxing International Airport
- Dalian Zhoushuizi International Airport
- Jinan Yaoqiang International Airport
- Qingdao Jiaodong International Airport
- Shenyang Taoxian International Airport
- Tianjin Binhai International Airport
- Shijiazhuang Zhengding International Airport

Regional airports:

- Beijing Nanyuan Airport
- Chengde Airport
- Qinhuangdao Beidaihe Airport
- Tangshan Sannühe Airport
- Weihai Airport
- Yantai Laishan International Airport
- Zhangjiakou Ningyuan Airport

=== Land ===
There are many major highways servicing the routes within the Bohai rim area.

=== Rail ===
Since 2000, there have been rapid infrastructure developments within the Bohai Economic Rim. Rail projects of varied natures have been built, including high-speed rail, metros and suburban rail.

==== High-speed rail ====
In 2006, the Chinese government had plans to construct 710 kilometres (440 mi) of high-speed railway in the Beijing-Tianjin-Hebei region by 2020.

In August 2008, the Beijing–Tianjin Intercity Railway opened providing a direct route between Beijing and Tianjin. The initial trains run on average 300 km/h and have cut journey times between the two municipalities to half an hour. The most important High-Speed Railway here is Beijing-Shanghai High-Speed Railway, which connected the Bohai Economic Rim to the Yangtze River Delta. This railway passing Jinan, Shandong's capital city. Another important High-speed railway in this area is Beijing-Guangzhou High-Speed Railway, passing Shijiazhuang, the capital of Hebei. Besides, there is Beijing-Harbin High-Speed Railway, passing Liaoning's capital Shenyang.

==== Light rail ====
- Tianjin Tram
- Dalian Tram

==== Metros ====
- Beijing Subway
- Tianjin Metro
- Shenyang Metro
- Shijiazhuang Metro

==== Suburban railway ====
- Beijing Suburban Railway
- Tianjin Suburban Railway (Tianjin–Jizhou railway)

== Geography ==
The gulf is formed by the Liaodong Peninsula to the northeast and the Shandong Peninsula to the south. Bo Hai consists of three bays: Laizhou Bay to the south, Liaodong Bay to the north, and Bohai Wan to the west. The rivers Yellow River, Liao He, Hai He and Luan River empty into Bo Hai.

The Bohai economic rim includes Beijing, Tianjin, part of Hebei province, part of Liaoning province, and part of Shandong province. List of major cities or ports in these municipalities and provinces are listed below:

Inner Rim (Jingjinji)

- Municipalities: Beijing and Tianjin (including Binhai New Area)
- Hebei Province: Tangshan, Qinhuangdao, Cangzhou, Langfang, Shijiazhuang, Baoding, and Xiong'an

North Rim (Liaoning)

- Shenyang, Dalian, Huludao, Jinzhou, Yingkou, Anshan, Panjin, Benxi, Fushun, and Liaoyang

South Rim (Shandong)

- Jinan, Qingdao, Weihai, Weifang, Yantai, Dongying, Binzhou, and Zibo

== See also ==
- Bohai Sea
- Jing-Jin-Ji
- Megalopolises in China
- Pearl River Delta
- Yangtze River Delta
