= Jing-Jin-Ji =

Urban agglomeration in North China

Coordinates: 38°42′N 118°6′E

Jing-Jin-Ji 京津冀城市群
- Megalopolis
- Beijing–Tianjin–Hebei Urban Agglomeration
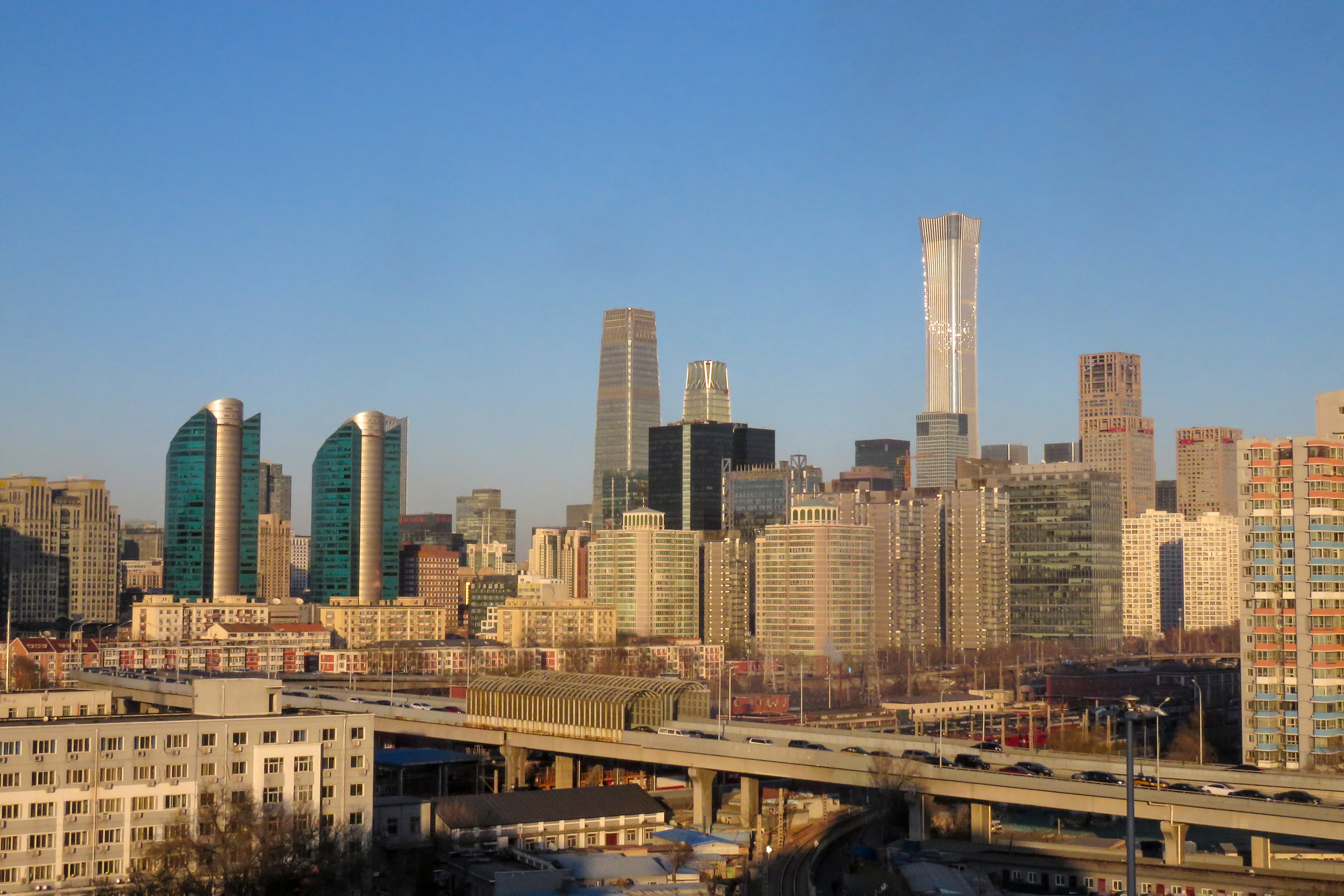
- Beijing, the largest city in megalopolis

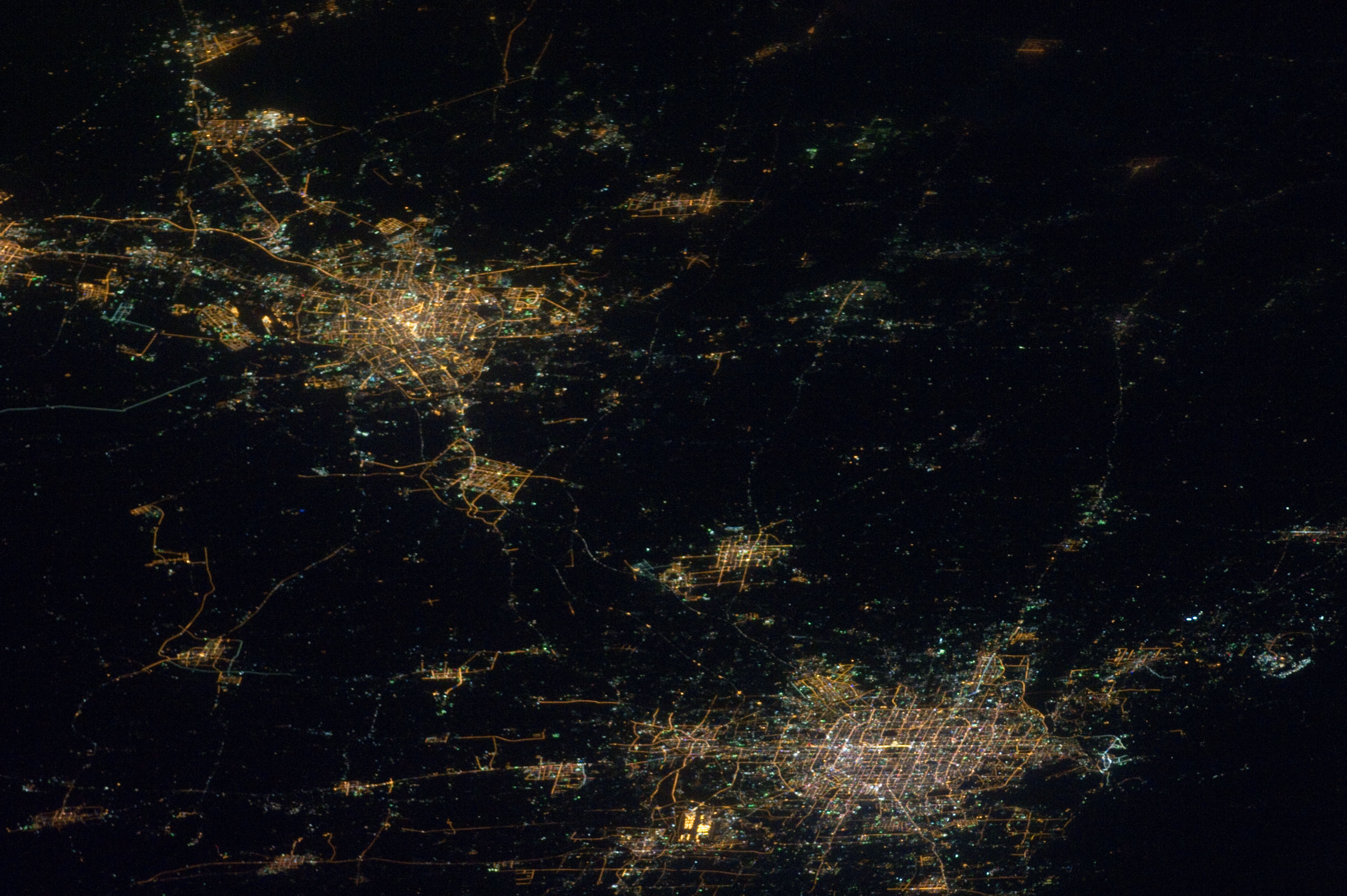
- Beijing-Tianjin from space
- Country: People's Republic of China
- Province: Hebei
- Municipalities: Beijing; Tianjin
- Major Prefectural Cities: Baoding; Shijiazhuang; Tangshan; Cangzhou; Langfang; Zhangjiakou; Chengde; Qinhuangdao

Government
  - Mayor of Beijing: Yin Yong
  - Mayor of Tianjin: Zhang Gong
  - Governor of Hebei: Wang Zhengpu

Area
  - Total: 217,156 km^{2} (83,844 sq mi)

Population (2020)
  - Total: 110 million
  - Density: 507/km^{2} (1,310/sq mi)

GDP
  - Total: CN¥12 trillion (US$1.7 trillion) (2025)
- Time zone: UTC+8 (CST)

The Jing-Jin-Ji cluster (Note: 京津冀城市群; Jīng (京), Jīn (津), and Jì (冀) are the common abbreviations for Beijing, Tianjin, and Hebei, respectively. Jing–Jin–Ji can also be translated as Beijing–Tianjin–Hebei.) is an expanded urban agglomeration consisting of Beijing (Jing), Tianjin (Jin), and Hebei (Ji). It is the biggest urban agglomeration region in North China, including an economic region surrounding the municipalities of Beijing and Tianjin, and along the coast of the Bohai Sea. This emerging region is rising as a northern metropolitan region rivaling the Pearl River Delta in the south and the Yangtze River Delta in the east. In 2020, it had a total population of 110 million people, comparable to that of the Philippines.

== Economy ==
	Area (km^{2})	Population (2020)	GDP (CN¥)	GDP (US$)
Beijing (Jing)	16,411	21,893,095	CN¥ 5,207.300 billion	US$699.876 billion
Tianjin (Jin)	11,946	13,866,009	CN¥ 1,853.982 billion	US$253.090 billion
Hebei (Ji)	188,800	74,610,235	CN¥ 4,930.520 billion	US$667.353 billion
Jingjinji Urban Agglomeration	217,156	110,369,339	CN¥ 11.992 trillion	US$1.679 trillion

As of 2025, the region's GDP is CN¥12 trillion (US$1.7 trillion), slightly larger than Turkey. It occupied an area about twice the size of South Korea. Jingjinji had traditionally been involved in heavy industries and manufacturing. Tianjin's strengths have always been in aviation, logistics, and shipping. Beijing complements this economic activity with strong petrochemical, education, and R&D industries. The area is becoming a significant growth cluster for automobile, electronics, petrochemical sectors, automotive industry, software and aircraft, thus attracting foreign investments in manufacturing and health services.

The Chinese central government has made it a priority to integrate all the cities in the Bohai Bay rim and foster economic development. This includes building an advanced communications network, better highways, increased education, and scientific resources, as well as tapping natural resources off the Bohai rim. In 2016, the Central Government approved a US$36-billion plan to link the various cities making up this metropolis by rail in order to reduce commute times and to better integrate them. This plan includes the construction of nine railways that are 1,100 km (680 mi) in length, which are set to be completed by 2020. The long-term goal is to create a one-hour commuting region; an additional 24 intercity railways are planned to be built before 2050.

In recent decades, petroleum and natural gas deposits have been discovered in the Jingjinji region's coast of the Bohai sea.

=== Metropolitan areas ===
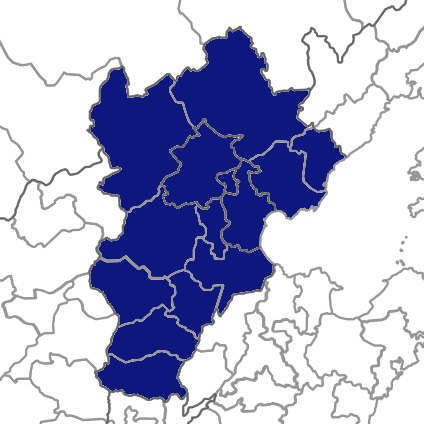
Jing-Jin-Ji metropolitan area (in blue)

In 2013-2014, General Secretary of the Chinese Communist Party Xi Jinping gave directives on coordinating development in the region, elevating development strategies in the region to be a national priority. In particular, planning strategies sought to alleviate development pressure in Beijing. The desire to alleviate the development pressure of Beijing's increasing non-capital functions was formalized in the June 2015 Outline Plan for Coordinated Development of Beijing-Tianjin-Hebei and subsequently resulted in the establishment of Xiong'an. Xiong'an is where Beijing's non-capital functions, such as universities, research institutes, and high-tech innovation centers are planned to be transferred over time.

Metropolitan area	Chinese	Cities and districts	Urban population
Beijing metropolitan area	北京城市圈; Běijīng Chéngshì Quān	Beijing	16,858,692
Tianjin metropolitan area	天津城市圈; Tiānjīn Chéngshì Quān	Tianjin, Binhai, Baodi, Jinghai, Jizhou, Ninghe	10,277,893
Shijiazhuang metropolitan area	石家庄城市圈; Shíjiāzhuāng Chéngshì Quān	Shijiazhuang, Jinzhou, Xinji, Xinle	3,823,504
Baoding-Xiong'an metropolitan area	保定雄安城市圈; Bǎodìng-Xióng'ān Chéngshì Quān	Baoding, Xiong'an, Anguo, Dingzhou, Gaobeidian, Zhuozhou	3,056,000
Tangshan metropolitan area	唐山城市圈; Tángshān Chéngshì Quān	Tangshan	2,237,317

== Major cities ==
Jingjinji includes the Beijing, Tianjin, and Hebei provinces. Major cities in these municipalities and provinces include:

City	Pinyin	Population (2010)	Image	Information	City Map
Beijing 北京	Běijīng	19,612,368		Beijing is a metropolis in northern China and the capital of the People's Republic of China. Beijing is governed as a municipality under the direct administration of the central government. Beijing is China's second-largest city after Shanghai; more than 17 million people in Beijing's jurisdiction.	
Tianjin 天津	Tiānjīn	12,938,224		The third-largest city of the People's Republic of China in terms of the urban population. Administratively it is one of the four municipalities that have provincial-level status, reporting directly to the central government. Its urban land area is the third-largest in China, ranked only after Beijing and Shanghai.	
Baoding 保定	Bǎodìng	10,029,197		Baoding is the third-largest city in Hebei Province, ranked after Shijiazhuang and Tangshan. The city is located in the center of the Beijing-Tianjin-Shijiazhuang Economic Triangle, with good transportation connections and close commuting distances to its nearby major cities. The newly established Xiong'an New Area aims to be a high-tech, environmentally sustainable, modern metropolis and serves as a new hub for some administrative departments. Logistics bases in northern China are within the city limits of Baoding.	
Shijiazhuang 石家庄	Shíjiāzhuāng	9,547,869		Shijiazhuang is the capital of Hebei, as well as the third-largest city in Jingjinji, after Beijing and Tianjin.	
Tangshan 唐山	Tángshān	7,577,284		Tangshan, a coastal city along the Bohai Bay and neighboring Tianjin, is the second-largest city in Hebei, after Shijiazhuang. It is also known for the 1976 Tangshan earthquake.	
Cangzhou 沧州	Cāngzhōu	7,134,053		A city in south-east Hebei on the coast of the Bohai Sea coast. It borders Tianjin to the north.	
Langfang 廊坊	Lángfāng	4,358,839		Langfang is located between Beijing and Tianjin and contains the Sanhe exclave, which is separate from the rest of Hebei.	
Zhangjiakou 张家口	Zhāngjiākǒu	4,345,491		A city in north-west Hebei. It borders Beijing to the southeast.	
Chengde 承德	Chéngdé	3,473,197		A city in northeast Hebei, best known for the Chengde Mountain Resort and the base dialect for the Standard Mandarin Chinese language.	
Qinhuangdao 秦皇岛	Qínhuángdǎo	2,987,605		A city in north-east coastal Hebei, best known for the Beidaihe.	

== Transportation ==
=== Air ===
==== Major airports ====
- Beijing Capital International Airport
- Beijing Daxing International Airport
- Tianjin Binhai International Airport
- Shijiazhuang Zhengding International Airport

==== Regional airports ====
- Chengde Puning Airport
- Qinhuangdao Beidaihe Airport
- Tangshan Sannühe Airport
- Zhangjiakou Ningyuan Airport

=== Road ===
There are many major highways servicing the routes within Jingjinji area. This includes the following expressways:

- Jingjintang Expressway, from Beijing, through Tianjin's urban area, to Binhai / TEDA
- Jinghu Expressway, from Jinjing Gonglu Bridge to Shanghai (together with Jingjintang Expressway, this is the expressway from Beijing to Shanghai)
- Jingshen Expressway, through Baodi District on its way from Beijing to Shenyang
- Jingshi Expressway, from Beijing, to Shijiazhuang
- Baojin Expressway, from Beichen District, Tianjin, to Baoding, Hebei -- known in Tianjin as the Jinbao Expressway
- Jinbin Expressway, from Zhangguizhuang Bridge to Hujiayuan Bridge, both within Tianjin
- Jinji Expressway, from central Tianjin to Jixian County
- G95 Capital Area Loop Expressway

The following six China National Highways pass through Tianjin:

- China National Highway 102, through Ji County, Tianjin on its way from Beijing to Harbin
- China National Highway 103, from Beijing, through Tianjin's urban area, to Binhai
- China National Highway 104, from Beijing, through Tianjin, to Fuzhou
- China National Highway 105, from Beijing, through Tianjin, to Macau
- China National Highway 112, circular highway around Beijing, passes through Tianjin
- China National Highway 205, from Shanhaiguan, Hebei, through Tianjin, to Guangzhou

=== High-speed rail ===
==== Intercity high-speed rail lines ====
- Beijing–Tianjin intercity railway
- Tianjin–Baoding intercity railway

==== Other high-speed rail lines ====
- Beijing–Shanghai high-speed railway
- Beijing–Shenyang high-speed railway
- Beijing–Shijiazhuang high-speed railway
- Tianjin–Qinhuangdao high-speed railway

==== High-speed rail lines planned or under construction ====
- Beijing–Zhangjiakou intercity railway

=== Suburban railway ===
- Beijing Suburban Railway
- Tianjin Suburban Railway (Tianjin–Jizhou railway)

=== Metro systems ===
- Beijing Subway
- Shijiazhuang Metro
- Tianjin Metro

=== Light rail ===
- Tianjin Tram

== See also ==
- Bohai Economic Rim
- Megalopolises in China
- Pearl River Delta
- Yangtze River Delta
- Keihanshin
- Greater Tokyo Area
- Seoul Capital Area
- Taipei–Keelung metropolitan area
