= Xushui railway station =

Railway station in Baoding, Hebei, China

Xushui 徐水
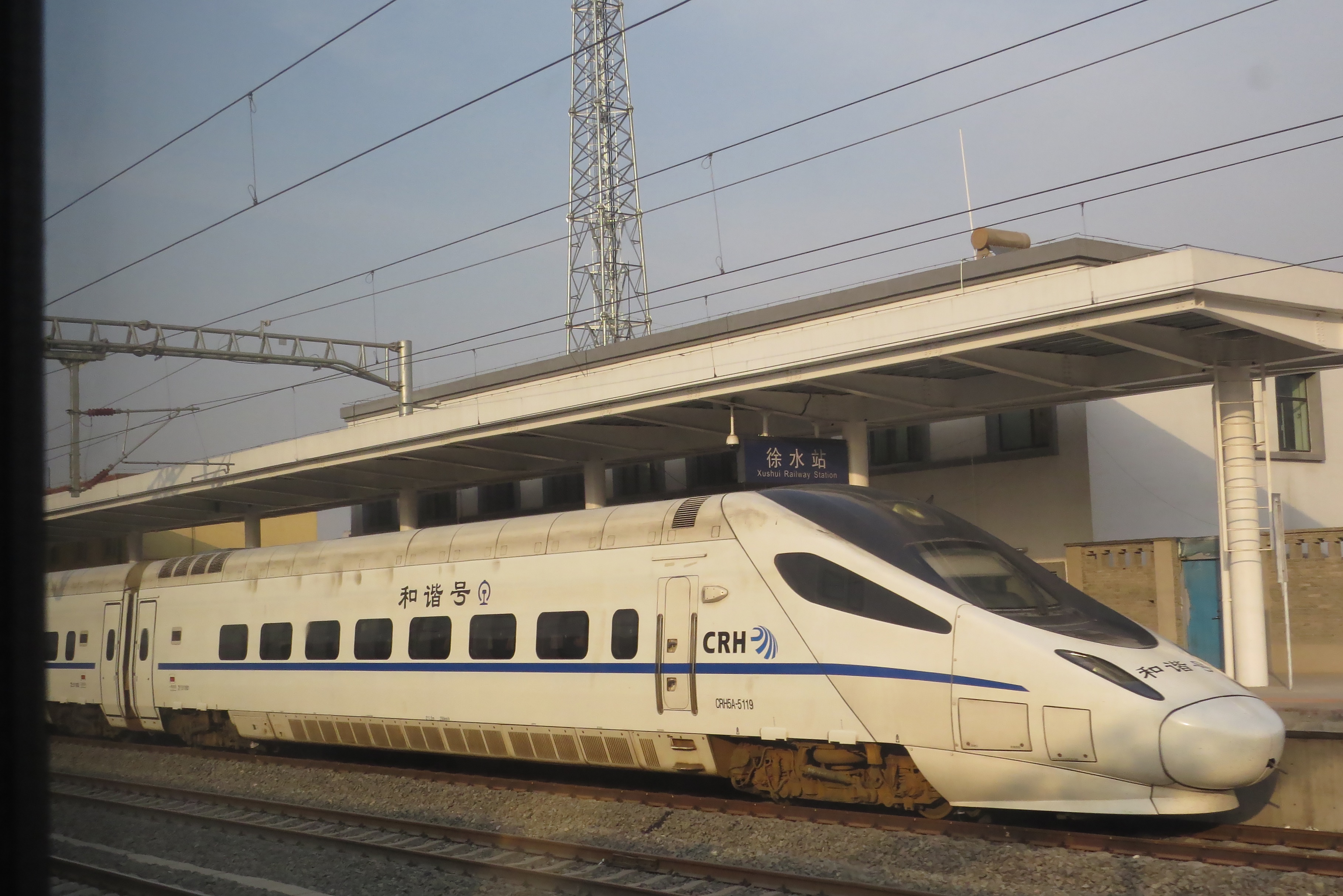
- A CRH5A EMU at the station

General information
- Location: Changcheng N. Street; Xushui District, Baoding, Hebei; China
- Coordinates: 39°01′46″N 115°38′13″E
- Operator: CR Beijing
- Lines: Beijing–Guangzhou railway; Tianjin–Baoding intercity railway
- Distance: Beijing–Guangzhou railway: 119 kilometres (74 mi) from Beijing West; 2,177 kilometres (1,353 mi) from Guangzhou; Tianjin–Baoding intercity railway: 137 kilometres (85 mi) from Tianjin West; 24 kilometres (15 mi) from Baoding
- Platforms: 3 (1 side platform and 1 island platform)
- Tracks: 5

Other information
- Station code: 20300 (TMIS code); XSP (telegraph code); XSH (Pinyin code)
- Classification: Class 3 station (三等站)

History
- Opened: 1899
- Former names: Ansu County (Chinese: 安肃县)

Services
Preceding station	China Railway	Following station
Gaobeidian towards Beijing West	Beijing–Guangzhou railway	Baoding towards Guangzhou
Preceding station	China Railway High-speed	Following station
Baiyangdian towards Tianjin West	Tianjin–Baoding intercity railway	Baoding Terminus
Location
- Location within Hebei Location within China

Xushui railway station (Chinese: 徐水站) is a station on Beijing–Guangzhou railway and Tianjin–Baoding intercity railway in Xushui District, Baoding, Hebei.

== History ==
The station was opened in 1899.

The station was expanded in 2014 due to the construction of the Tianjin–Baoding intercity railway. The expansion was finished in 2015 and passenger services resumed on 10 January 2016.
