= Megalopolises in China =

- Chinese: 城市群
- Literal meaning: City Group
- Hanyu Pinyin: Chéngshì Qún
- Jyutping: Sing^{4} Si^{5} Kwan^{4}

In China, a megalopolis (Chinese: 城市群; pinyin: Chéngshì Qún) is a designation by the government to promote the development of a group of cities through transportation and communication links.

== Conceptual history ==
The Economist Intelligence Unit in 2012 identified 13 megalopolises: Chang-Zhu-Tan (Greater Changsha), Chengdu, Chongqing, Greater Beijing i.e. Jing-Jin-Ji, Greater Shanghai (incl. Suzhou), Greater Xi'an, Greater Zhengzhou, Greater Guangzhou, Hefei economic circle (incl. Lu'an, Huainan, Chaohu), Shandong Peninsula, Greater Shenyang, Shenzhen and Wuhan.

As of 2018, there are nine officially approved megalopolises in China. In 2017, the National Development and Reform Commission stated that plans for six city clusters had been completed in 2016, five in 2017, with eight more forthcoming for a total of 19 city cluster plans by 2020. The new city clusters identified in 2017 were Lanzhou-Xining, Hohhot-Baotou-Ordos-Yulin, Guanzhong Plain, Western Taiwan Straits Economic Zone, and the Guangdong-Hong Kong-Macau Greater Bay Area.

The Thirteenth Five-Year Plan (covering 2016-2020) highlighted nineteen city clusters to be developed and strengthened pursuant to a geographic layout referred to as two horizontals and three verticals (liang heng san zong). The highlighted clusters included the Beijing-Tianjin-Hebei region, the Yangtze River delta region, and the Greater Bay area. Development of these clusters includes establishing regional coordination mechanisms, sharing development costs and benefits, collaborative industrial development, and shared governance approaches to ecological issues and environmental protection.

Location map of the first three megalopolises in China: Jing-Jin-Ji Megalopolis (yellow, north), Yangtze River Delta Megalopolis (blue, middle) and Guangdong-Hong Kong-Macau Greater Bay Area (silver, south).

== Major Chinese megalopolises ==
Megalopolises	Metropolitan areas	Cities	Area (km^{2})	Population	Date of approval
Yangtze River Delta Megalopolis	Shanghai, Nanjing Metropolitan Area, Hangzhou Metropolitan Area, Hefei Metropolitan Area, Suzhou-Wuxi-Changzhou Metropolitan Area, Ningbo Metropolitan Area	Municipality: Shanghai; Jiangsu: Nanjing, Wuxi, Changzhou, Suzhou, Nantong, Yancheng, Yangzhou, Zhenjiang, Taizhou; Zhejiang: Hangzhou, Ningbo, Jiaxing, Huzhou, Shaoxing, Jinhua, Zhoushan, Taizhou; Anhui: Hefei, Wuhu, Ma'anshan, Tongling, Anqing, Chuzhou, Chizhou, Xuancheng	350,000	240,000,000 (2020)	22 May 2016
Guangdong-Hong Kong-Macao Greater Bay Area	Guangzhou-Foshan-Zhaoqing Metropolitan Area, Shenzhen-Dongguan-Huizhou Metropolitan Area, Zhuhai-Zhongshan-Jiangmen Metropolitan Area	Guangdong: Guangzhou, Foshan, Zhaoqing, Shenzhen, Dongguan, Huizhou, Zhuhai, Jiangmen, Zhongshan; SARs: Hong Kong, Macau	56,000	70,000,000 (2017)	18 February 2019
Jing-Jin-Ji Megalopolis	Beijing Metropolitan Area, Tianjin Metropolitan Area	Municipalities: Beijing, Tianjin; Hebei: Xiong'an New Area, Tangshan, Baoding, Shijiazhuang, Langfang, Zhangjiakou, Chengde, Cangzhou, Qinhuangdao, Xingtai, Handan, Hengshui	217,100	130,000,000	Pending approval
Shandong Peninsula Megalopolis	Jinan Metropolitan Area, Qingdao Metropolitan Area	Shandong: Jinan, Qingdao, Yantai, Weihai, Zibo, Binzhou, Dongying, Tai'an, Weifang, Rizhao, Linyi		28,000,000	Pending approval
Mid-Southern Liaoning Megalopolis	Shenyang Metropolitan Area, Dalian Metropolitan Area	Liaoning: Shenyang, Dalian, Benxi, Liaoyang, Anshan, Yingkou, Pulandian, Gaizhou		27,000,000	Pending approval
Yangtze River Midstream Megalopolis	Wuhan Metropolitan Area, Circum-Changzhutan City Cluster, Circum-Poyang Lake City Cluster	Hubei: Wuhan, Huangshi, Ezhou, Huanggang, Xiaogan, Xianning, Xiantao, Qianjiang, Tianmen, Xiangyang, Yichang, Jingzhou; Hunan: Changsha, Zhuzhou, Xiangtan, Yueyang, Yiyang, Changde, Hengyang, Loudi; Jiangxi: Nanchang, Jiujiang, Jingdezhen, Yingtan, Xinyu, Yichun, Pingxiang, Shangrao, Fuzhou, Ji'an	317,000	121,000,000 (2014)	26 March 2015
Harbin-Changchun Megalopolis	Harbin Metropolitan Area, Changchun-Jilin Metropolitan Area	Heilongjiang: Harbin, Daqing, Qiqihar, Suihua, Mudanjiang; Jilin: Changchun, Jilin, Siping, Liaoyuan, Songyuan, Yanbian Korean Autonomous Prefecture	51,100	20,000,000 (2015)	23 February 2016
Chengyu Megalopolis	Chengdu Metropolitan Area, Chongqing Metropolitan Area	Municipality: Chongqing; Sichuan: Chengdu, Leshan, Luzhou, Mianyang, Nanchong, Yibin, Meishan, Ziyang, Deyang, Suining, Neijiang, Zigong, Yongchuan, Dazhou, Guang'an	185,000	90,940,000 (2014)	12 April 2016
Central Plain Megalopolis	Greater Zhengzhou Metropolitan Area	Henan: Zhengzhou, Kaifeng, Luoyang, Nanyang, Shangqiu, Anyang, Xinxiang, Pingdingshan, Xuchang, Jiaozuo, Zhoukou, Xinyang, Zhumadian, Hebi, Puyang, Luohe, Sanmenxia, Jiyuan; Shanxi: Changzhi, Jincheng, Yuncheng; Hebei: Xingtai, Handan; Shandong: Liaocheng, Heze; Anhui: Huaibei, Bengbu, Suzhou, Fuyang, Bozhou	287,000	24,170,000	28 December 2016
Beibu Gulf Megalopolis	Nanning, Nanning-Beihai-Qinzhou-Fangchenggang, Zhanjiang-Maoming-Yangjiang, Haikou, Zhanjiang	Guangxi: Nanning, Beihai, Qinzhou, Fangchenggang, Yulin, Chongzuo; Guangdong: Zhanjiang, Maoming, Yangjiang; Hainan: Haikou, Zhangzhou, Dongfang, Chengmai, Lingao, Changjiang	116,600	41,410,000 (2015)	20 January 2017
Guanzhong Plain Megalopolis	Greater Xi'an Metropolitan Area	Shaanxi: Xi'an, Baoji, Xianyang, Tongchuan, Weinan, Yangling Agricultural Hi-tech Industries Demonstration Zone, Shangluo (Shangzhou District, Luonan County, Danfeng County and Zhashui County); Shanxi: Yuncheng (Pinglu County and Yuanqu County excluded), Linyi (Yaodu District, Houma City, Xiangfen County, Huozhou, Quwo County, Yicheng County, Hongtong County and Fushan County); Gansu: Tianshui, Pingliang (Kongtong District, Huating County, Jingchuan County, Chongxin County and Lingtai County), downtown Qingyang	107,100	38,630,000 (2016)	9 January 2018
Hohhot-Baotou-Ordos-Yulin Megalopolis		Inner Mongolia: Hohhot, Baotou, Ordos Shaanxi: Yulin	175,000	11,384,000 (2016)	5 February 2018
Lanzhou-Xining Megalopolis	Lanzhou-Baiyin Metropolitan Area, Xining-Haidong Metropolitan Area	Gansu: Lanzhou, Baiyin (Baiyin District, Pingchuan District, Jingyuan County, Jingtai County), Dingxi (Anding District, Longxi County, Weiyuan County, Lintao County), Linxia Hui Autonomous Prefecture (Linxia City, Dongxiang Autonomous County, Yongjing County, Jishishan Bonan, Dongxiang and Salar Autonomous County); Qinghai: Xining, Haidong, Haibei Tibetan Autonomous Prefecture (Haiyan County), Hainan Tibetan Autonomous Prefecture (Gonghe County, Guide County, Guinan County), Huangnan Tibetan Autonomous Prefecture (Tongren County, Jianzha County)	97,500	11,930,000 (2016)	22 February 2018

== See also ==
- City proper
- Global city
- List of cities by population
- List of cities in the Far East by population
- List of country subdivisions by GDP over 100 billion US dollars
- List of largest cities
- List of metropolitan areas by population
- List of regions of China
- Megacity
- Megalopolis
- Metropolis
- Metropolitan area
- Urban area
