= Changzhutan =

City cluster in Hunan, China

Changzhutan 长株潭城市群
- Metropolitan area
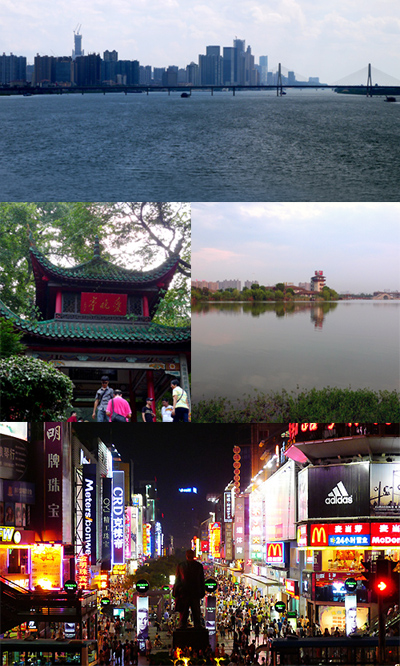
- Changsha, clockwise from top: Skyline of Changsha, Yuehu Park, Huangxing South Pedestrian Street, Aiwan Pavilion
- Interactive map of Changzhutan
- Country: China
- Province: Hunan
- Largest city: Changsha

Area
  - Metropolitan area: 28,087 km^{2} (10,844 sq mi)
  - Urban: 1,883 km^{2} (727 sq mi)

Population (2022)
  - Metropolitan area: 17,000,000
  - Urban: 8,300,000
  - Urban density: 4,400/km^{2} (11,000/sq mi)

GDP
  - Metropolitan area: ¥ 2.213 trillion US$ 311 billion (2024)

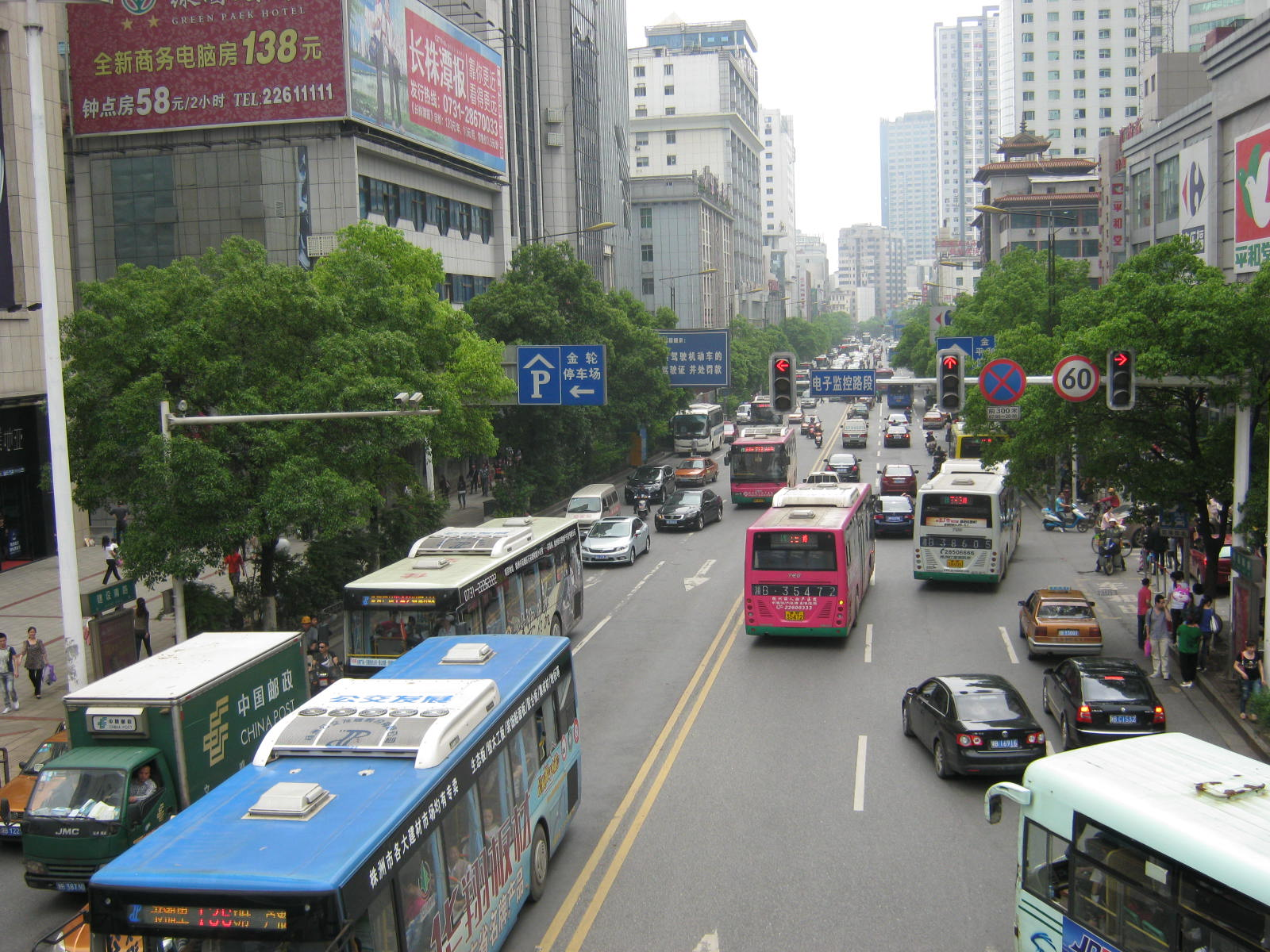
Jianshe South Road (建设南路) in Zhuzhou

Changzhutan or Chang-Zhu-Tan, also Greater Changsha Metropolitan Region or Changsha-Zhuzhou-Xiangtan City Cluster (simplified Chinese: 长株潭城市群; traditional Chinese: 長株潭城市群; pinyin: Cháng-Zhū-Tán Chéngshì Qún) is a city cluster in Hunan province, China, consisting of the provincial capital, Changsha and two other prefecture-level cities: Xiangtan and Zhuzhou; it is the main heavily urbanized region of Hunan and covers an area of 28,087 km^{2} (10,844 sq mi).

	Area (km^{2})	Population (2022)	GDP (CN¥)	GDP (US$)
Changsha (Chang)	11,819	10,420,600	CN¥ 1,527 billion	US$ 214 billion
Zhuzhou (Zhu)	11,262	3,871,100	CN¥ 390 billion	US$ 55 billion
Xiangtan (Tan)	5,006	2,726,200	CN¥ 296 billion	US$ 42 billion
Changzhutan	28,087	17,000,000	CN¥ 2,213 billion	US$ 311 billion

Economist Intelligence Unit identified Chang-Zhu-Tan as one of China's 13 megalopolises in its 2012 report "Supersized Cities", with an estimated 2010 population of 8.3 million and 2009 GDP of 320 million Chinese yuan (CNY) Other sources put the population at 5.92 million.

It covers an area of 1,883 km^{2} in the urban area with a population of 5.92 million, GDP reaches 568 billion CNY (US$90 billion), GDP per capita of 96,067 CNY (US$15,665), the core area of three cities (Changzhutan metropolis) had an area of 483.77 km^{2} in 2012. On December 14, 2007, it was issued as Comprehensive Supporting Reform Trial Areas to build a resource conserving and environment friendly society by China NDRC.

The Changsha–Zhuzhou–Xiangtan intercity railway connects the three urban cores and surrounding areas.

The area has been given a unified telephone area code.
