= Baiyang Lake =

Lake in Hebei, China

- Location within Hebei
- Location: Baoding, Hebei
- Coordinates: 38.850°N 116.000°E
- Basin countries: China
- Surface area: 366 km^{2} (141 sq mi)

Baiyang Lake
- Chinese: 白洋淀
- Literal meaning: White Sea Lake
Transcriptions
Standard Mandarin
- Hanyu Pinyin: Báiyáng Diàn

Baiyang Lake, also known as Lake Baiyangdian, is located in the Xiong'an New Area of Baoding, a prefecture-level city in Hebei Province, China. It is the largest freshwater lake in northern China. It is referred to as the Kidney of North China.

== Environment ==
Baiyang Lake brings together nine of the upper reaches of the river water.

The lake is home to about 50 varieties of fish and multiple varieties of wild geese, ducks, and birds. The lake and side parks also are home to a vast number of lotus, reed and other plants. From harvesting the fauna and flora of the lake, the locals make a living.

Due to drought and over-exploitation of groundwater, as well as problems of industrial wastewater since the 1980s, faced with the test of water shortages and pollution of ecological problems to Baiyang lake, the city government of Baoding plans to solve this problem in ten years at a cost of 8 billion Yuan (year 2006–2008).

== History ==
During the War of Resistance against the Japanese, local residents and communists guerillas fought against the Japanese occupiers, using the lake and its water system for cover and protection.

Lake Baiyang is now the most important natural resources endowment for Xiong'an.

== Tourism ==
Baiyang Lake is about one hour by bullet train from Beijing. It is a national and international tourist attraction flaunting its peaceful water scenes and vast lotus gardens. Hand-driven and motorized boats are available for small to medium-sized groups; large motorized boats are available for large groups usually accompanied by a tour guide. Tourists can travel by boat into waters full of lotuses and pick seeds, leaves, and flowers. They can also stop by boats or islands and buy local seafood. It is classified as a AAAAA scenic area by the China National Tourism Administration. Islands on the lake host local restaurants that cook with local ingredients and hotels for the overnight tourist.

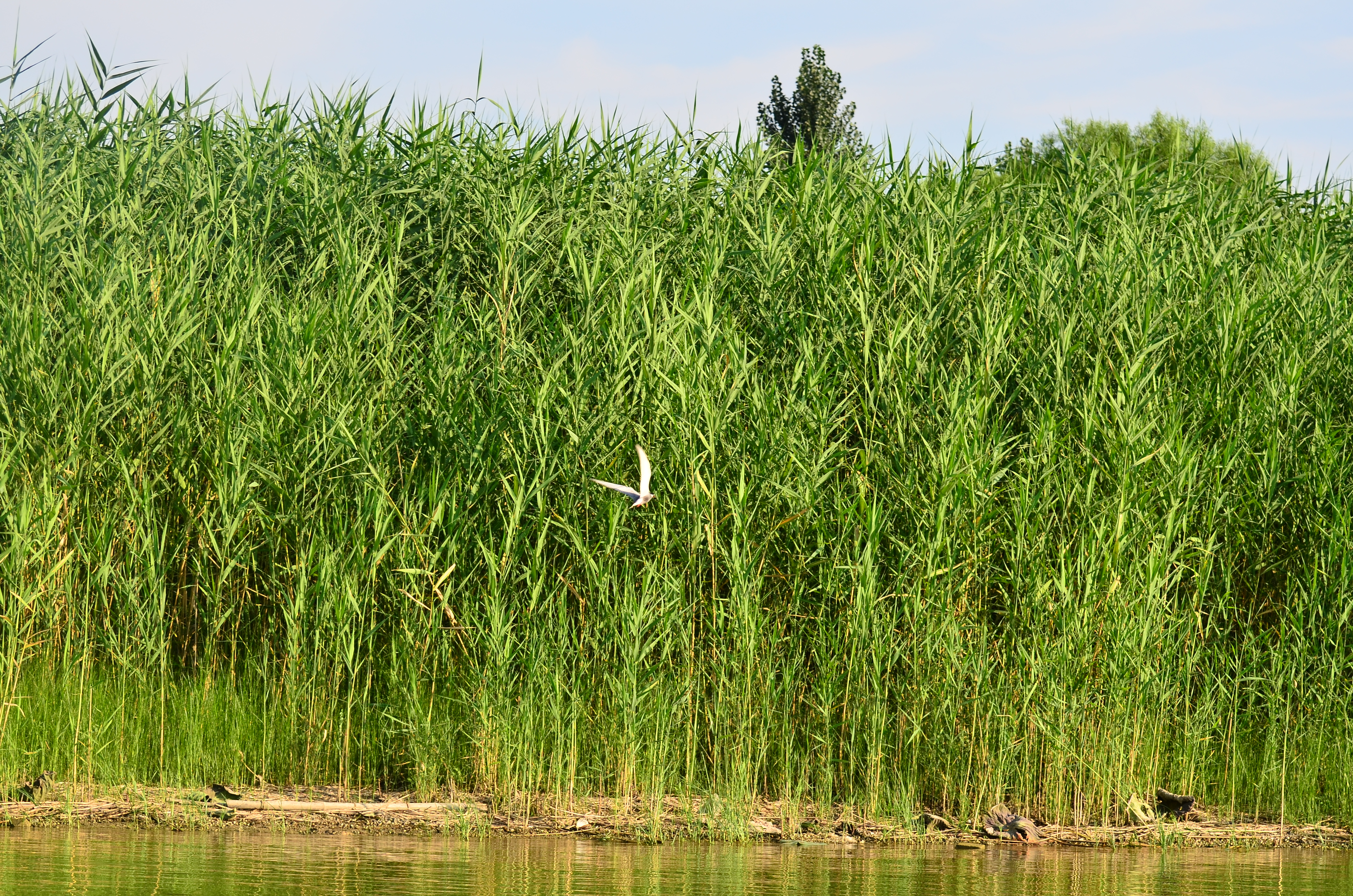
The reeds in the lake

== In literature ==
Many Chinese know of the lake from film and literature portrayals of the experiences of residents and communist guerillas opposing the Japanese occupiers during 1939-1943.

Baiyangdian is the setting for one of the classics in Chinese children's literature Little Soldier Zhang Ga by Xu Guangyao.
