= Xiong'an =

Xiong'an New Area 雄安新区
- State-level new area
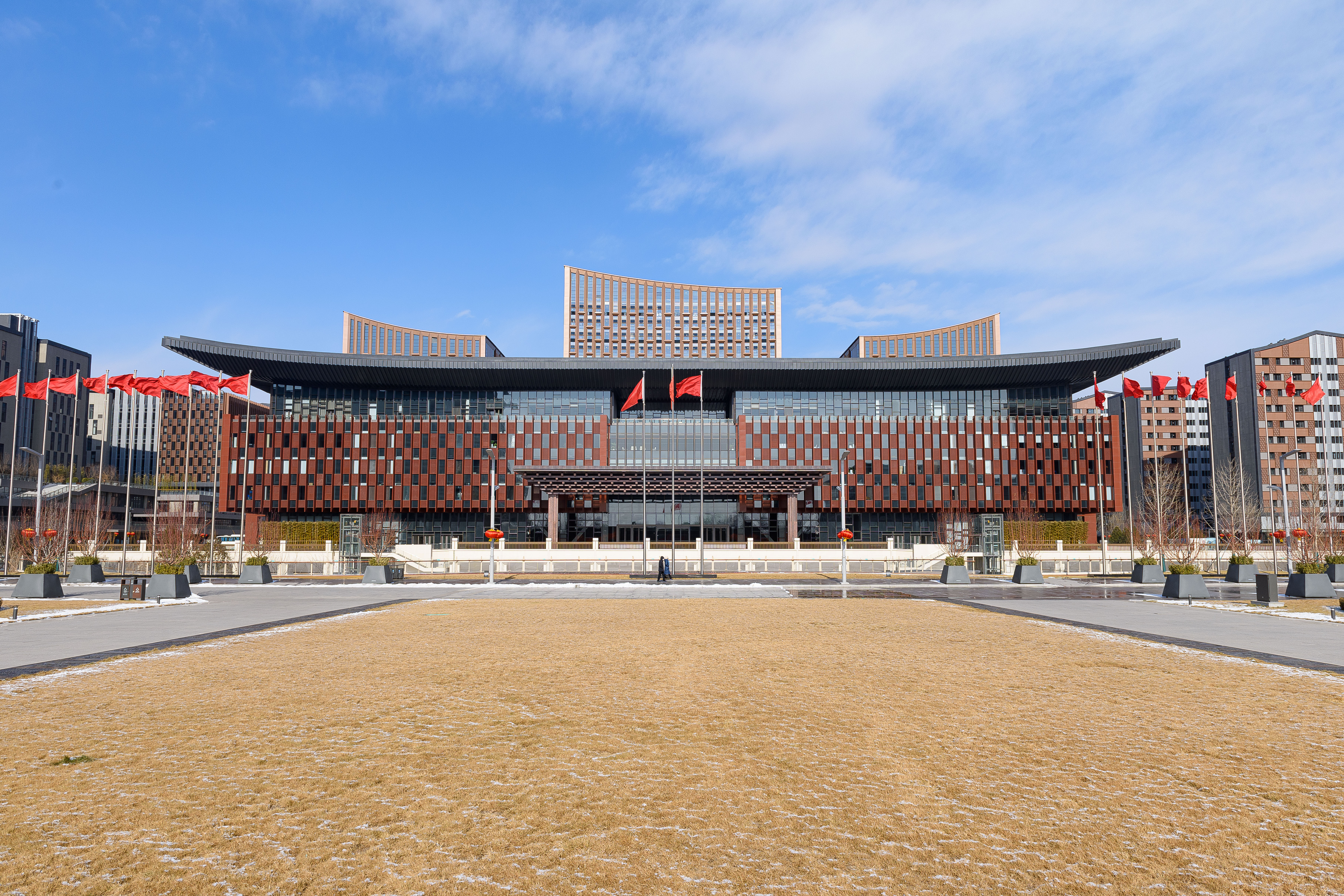
- Business and Service Convention Center Xiong'an in Rongcheng County

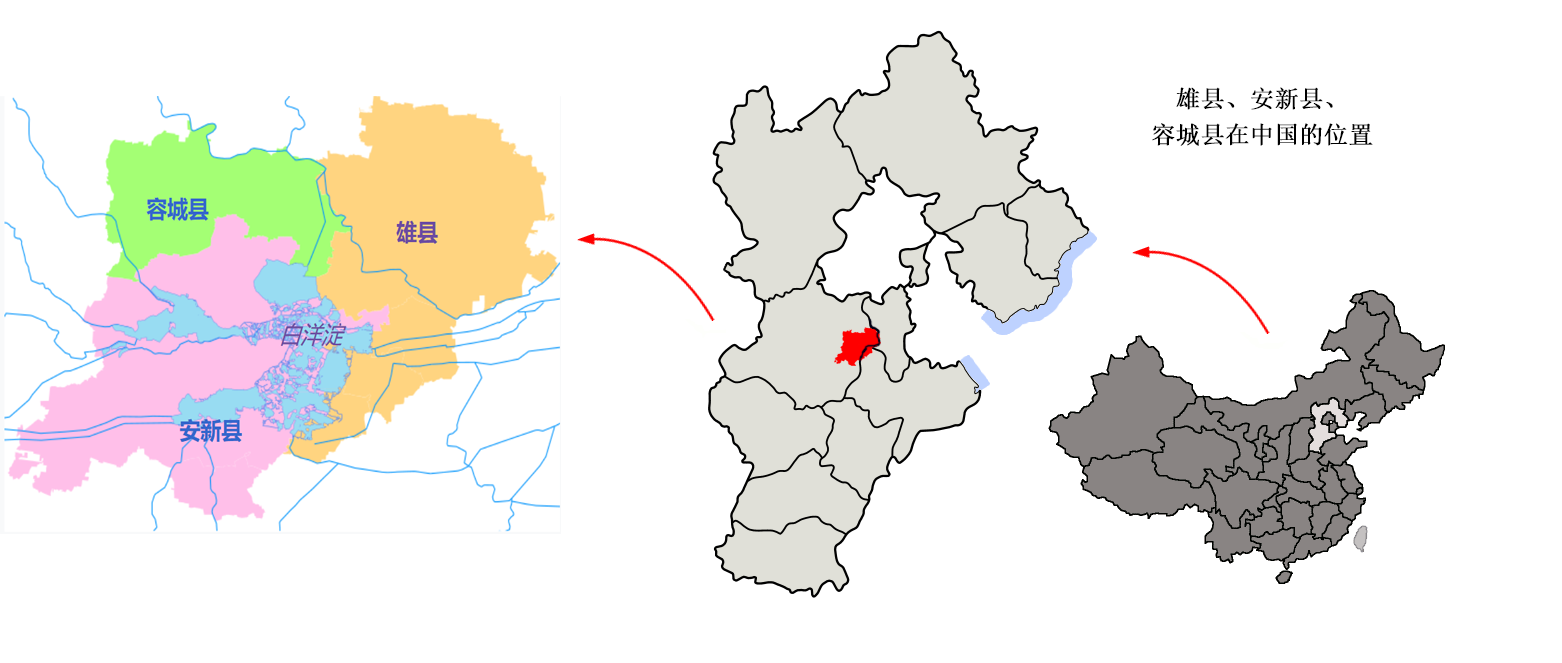
- Location of Xiong'an New Area in Hebei

- Location in Hebei Xiong'an New Area (Northern China) Xiong'an New Area (China)
- Coordinates: 39°02′55″N 115°54′13″E
- Country: People's Republic of China
- Province: Hebei
- Established: 1 April 2017

Government
  - Party secretary: Zhang Guohua (张国华)

Population (2020 census)
  - Total: 1,205,440
- Time zone: UTC+8 (China Standard Time)
- GDP (2019): 21.5 billion RMB
- Website: xiongan.gov.cn

Xiong'an
- Chinese: 雄安
Transcriptions
Standard Mandarin
- Hanyu Pinyin: Xióng'ān
- IPA: [ɕjʊ̌ŋ.án]

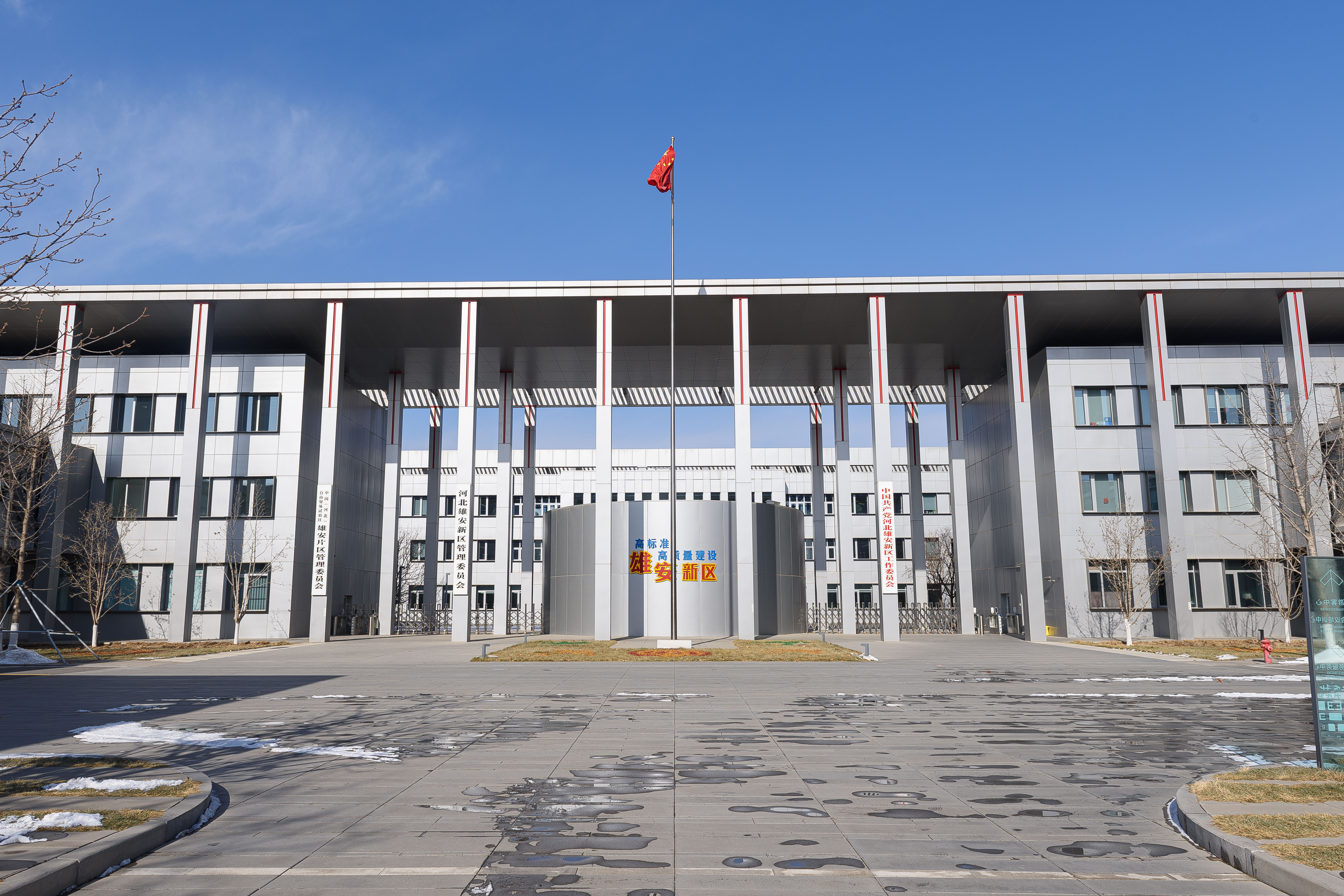
Government headquarters of Xiong'an New Area in January 2023

Xiong'an New Area (Note: Chinese: 雄安新区; pinyin: Xióng'ān Xīnqū) is a state-level new area in the Baoding area of Hebei, China. Established in April 2017, the area is located about 100 kilometers (62 mi) south of Beijing and 50 kilometers (31 mi) east of downtown Baoding. Its main function is to serve as a development hub for the Beijing-Tianjin-Hebei (Jing-Jin-Ji) economic triangle. Additionally, nonessential functions of the Chinese capital are expected to migrate here, including offices of some state-owned enterprises, government agencies, and research and development facilities. The city is planned to be erected by 2035, and to be completed by the middle of the 21st century, with a planned population of 5 million people. According to the results of the seventh national census of Xiong'an New Area, the resident population of Xiong'an New District is 1,205,440.

The area covers the counties of Xiong, Rongcheng and Anxin. Its name is a compound of the first elements of the names of two of them: Xiong and Anxin. The construction of the area is described as part of the "millennium strategy" (千年大计). Unlike other "new areas", Xiong'an's development is taking place under the direct oversight of the Central Committee of the Chinese Communist Party (CCP) and the State Council. The temporary government office of the New Area is located in Ao Wei International Hotel (Ao Wei Mansion) in Rongcheng.

== Geography ==
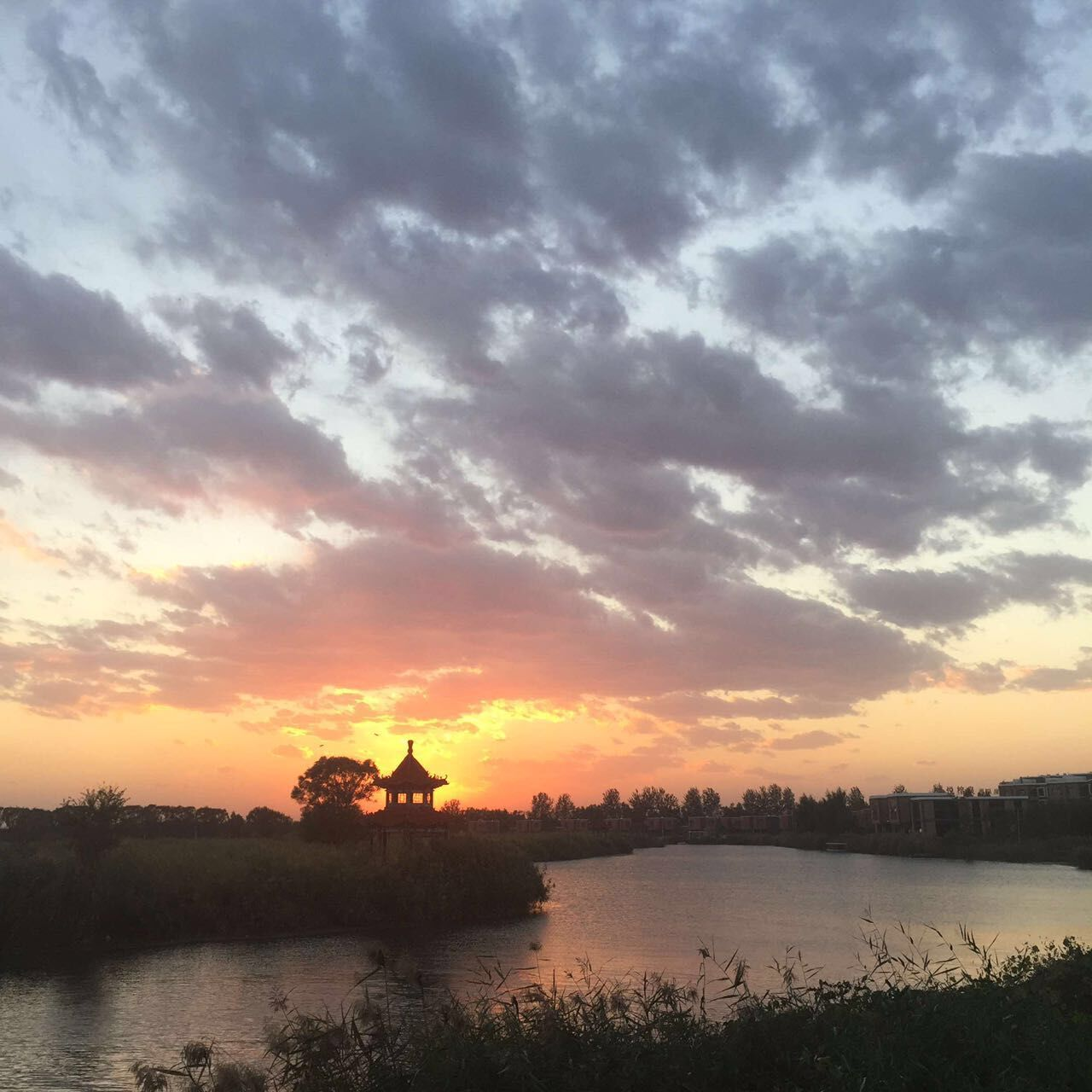
Baiyang Lake in the center of Xiong'an

=== Scope ===
Xiong'an New Area is located in the North China Plain, between 38°43' and 39°10' north latitude and 115°38' to 116°20' east longitude, 105 km from Beijing and Tianjin, 155 km from Shijiazhuang, 30 km from Baoding, 55 km from Beijing Daxing Airport. It is located at the geometric center of major cities in the Beijing–Tianjin–Hebei region. According to Xu Kuangdi, its location was also motivated by the traditional Chinese philosophy of positioning a city near mountains, rivers, and along axial lines.

Xiong'an's layout mixes urban and natural spaces organized in a manner termed "one center, five subcenters, and multiple nodes". As of 2024, 74,000 new trees had been planted in Xiong'an.

Xiong'an is planned as a Smart City. Its urban design is based on the idea of the "fifteen minute lifecycle" in which all the goods and services needed by an urban person should be available within a fifteen minute walk.

=== Hydrology ===
Xiong'an is well-endowed in water features and resources, which is comparatively unusual for north China. The area is located in the Daqing River system of the Haihe River Basin. The average river network density is 0.12–0.23 km per 1 km^{2}. Baiyang Lake, northern China's largest freshwater lake, is also included within the new area. The project aims to support restoration of the wetlands surrounding the lake.

Baiyang Lake is Xiong'an's most significant natural feature, including for its cultural and historical significance. It is noted for its scenic beauty. Many Chinese people know of the lake from movies and literature which depict its use by local residents and CCP guerrillas during the Second Sino-Japanese War.

=== Climate ===
The area is warm and rainy in spring, hot and rainy in summer, cool and dry in autumn, and cold and not snowy in winter. According to the meteorological data of Rongcheng County from 1968 to 2016, the annual average temperature is 12.4°C, the record high temperature is 41.2°C, the record low temperature is -22.2°C, and the annual sunshine hour is 2298.4 hours. The average precipitation is 495.1 mm.

=== Topography ===
The area is located in the plain to the east of Taihang Mountain. The terrain gradually decreases from northwest to southeast. The ground elevation is mostly 5 to 26 meters, and the ground slope is less than 2‰.

== History ==
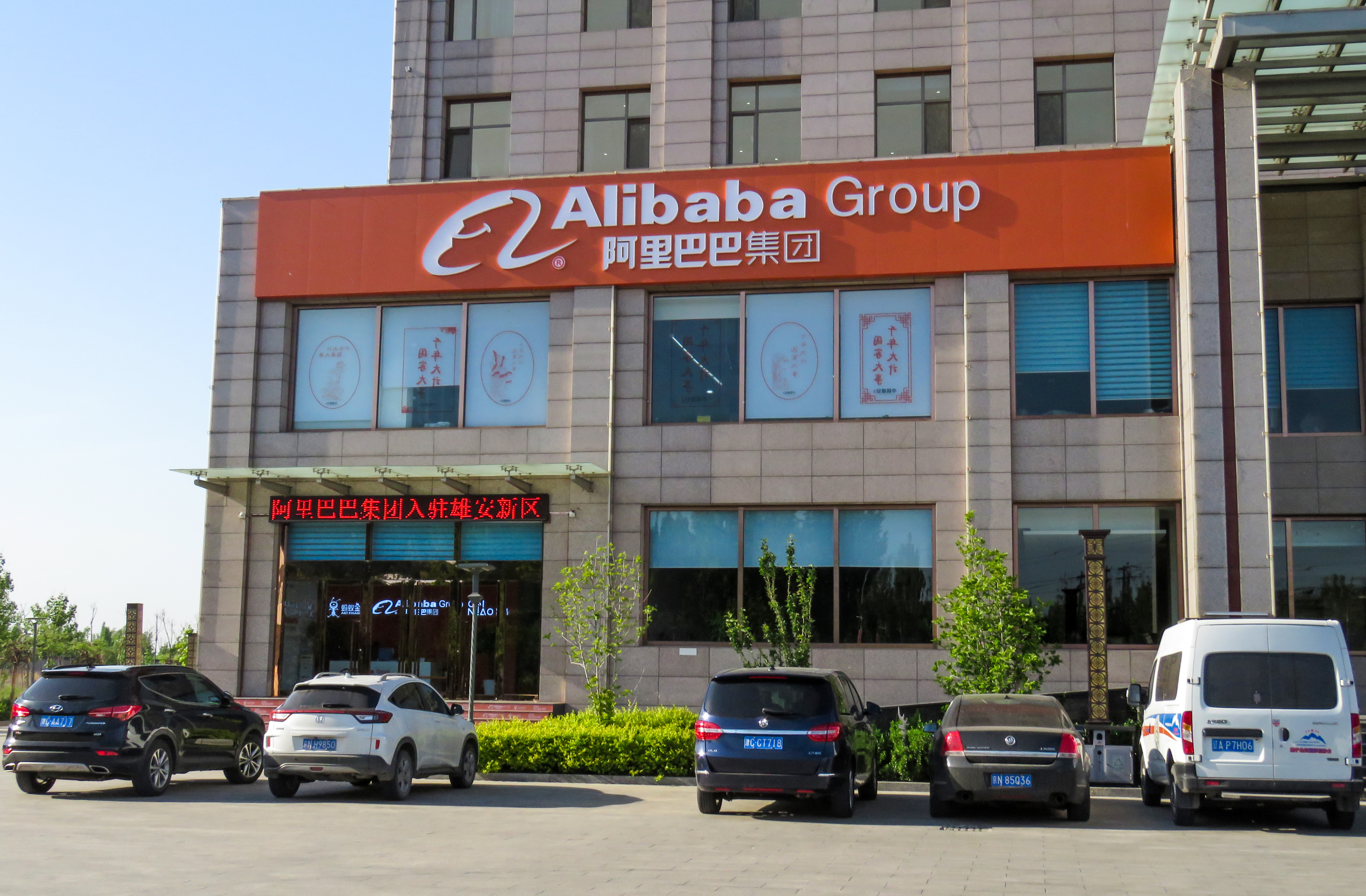
Alibaba Group's provisional office at Xiong'an

By 2014, China's central government was considering to relocate a number of Beijing's administrative and back office functions to Baoding. According to the memoir Dealing with China by US Treasury Secretary Henry Paulson, Xi Jinping, General Secretary of the Chinese Communist Party, told him personally in July 2014, and said the idea was his "own personal initiative". On 26 February 2014, after hearing reports from Beijing, Tianjin and Hebei, Xi considered the coordinated development of Beijing, Tianjin and Hebei as an important national strategy. After that, rumors such as "Baoding will become a political subcenter", "Baiyangdian City" and "Baiyangdian Free Trade Zone" surfaced on the Internet. Although the "New Urbanization Plan of Hebei Province" issued on 26 March of that year did not mention "subcenter", it was clear that some of Beijing's capital functions would be relieved. At the Central Economic Work Conference held at the end of the year, Xi emphasized that the core problem of the coordinated development of Beijing-Tianjin-Hebei is to relieve Beijing's non-capital functions, reduce Beijing's population density, and promote economic and social development to adapt to the population, resources and environment.

On 10 February 2015, at the 9th meeting of the Central Leading Group for Financial and Economic Affairs, Xi put forward the idea of “duō diǎn yī chéng, lǎo chéng chóngzǔ” (多点一城、老城重组) when considering the Beijing-Tianjin-Hebei Joint Development Plan. Specifically, "One City" (一城) is to study and plan to build a new city outside Beijing. On 2 and 30 April 2015, Xi presided over successive meetings of the Politburo Standing Committee and Politburo of the Chinese Communist Party to discuss the "Beijing-Tianjin-Hebei Coordinated Development Plan", and considered the planning to build a modern new city in a suitable site in Hebei. On 29 February 2016, Premier Li Keqiang presided over a special meeting of the State Council to study the planning and construction of a city, and put forward specific requirements.

On 24 March 2016, Xi chaired a meeting of the Politburo Standing Committee of the Chinese Communist Party, agreeing to name the new city "Xiong'an New Area". On 27 May 2016, the Politburo reviewed the "Report on the Planning and Construction of Beijing's Subcenter and Research on the Establishment of Hebei Xiong'an New District". This was the first time that "Xiong'an" appeared in the title of a report. The Politburo approved the "Implementation Plan for the Study of the Establishment of the Xiong'an New Area in Hebei", and the preparations for the plan were immediately carried out under a high degree of confidentiality.

On 23 February 2017, Xi made on-site inspection to Anxin County and Baiyang Lake, chairing a symposium, listening to reports and delivering an important speech on the planning and construction of Xiong'an New Area.

On 1 April 2017, the Central Committee of the Chinese Communist Party and the State Council issued a notice, deciding to establish the Xiong'an New Area. In the announcement, Xiong'an New Area was positioned as a "millennium plan and a national event". Previously, the information was so confidential that local government didn't know it in advance. In the wake of the announcement, local property prices and shares of construction companies soared. To counter the chaotic property market, authorities froze purchases and closed real estate offices. Xi, during a visit to Helsinki, Finland, gave instructions to prevent real estate speculation. Secretary of the Shenzhen Municipal Party Committee and Mayor Xu Qin was also appointed as the Standing Party Committee of Hebei Province, and then the Deputy Secretary. The same day, on 1 April 2017, the Provincial Government and the Hebei Provincial Party Committee decided to establish the Preparatory Work Committee and the Provisional Party Committee of the Xiong'an New Area. These were transitional institutions, under the authority of the Hebei Provincial Party Committee and the Provincial Government, responsible for organizing, leading, and coordinating the overall development and construction of Xiong'an New Area, performing the functions of organizing, coordinating, supervising political, economic, cultural, social, ecological activities in Xiong'an New Area.

On 2 April, a meeting of leading cadres was held in Rongcheng County. At the meeting, it was agreed that in the next step, management and control should continue to be a top priority, especially on land issues. The government must do a good job of management and control, communicating and propagating at all levels, and managing the power grid. The needs of the people need to be addressed as much as possible, and on the basis of strengthening management and control, it is necessary to accelerate housing relocation, planning and construction. The provincial government has also decided to assign a party cadre committee to temporarily take over the cadre work. On 3 April, the Preparatory Work Committee and Provisional Party Committee of Xiong'an New Area began working in Rongcheng County, temporarily renting Ao Wei International Hotel as an office location.

On 21 June 2017, at the working group meeting on planning and construction of Xiong'an New Area in Hebei Province, Xu Qin, the Governor of Hebei Province, read out the "Reply of the Central Organization Office on issues related to the establishment of management agencies in Xiong'an New Area in Hebei Province". Accordingly, the Xiong'an New Area Working Committee and the Xiong'an New Area Management Committee in Hebei, which were dispatched by the Provincial Party Committee and the Provincial Government, would be established. They were responsible for organizing, leading and coordinating the development and construction of Xiong'an New Area, as well as the overall work on development and construction management of the districts Xiong County, Anxin County, Rongcheng County and surrounding areas. At first, the Party Working Committee and the Xiong'an Management Committee established the Party and Government Office, Department of Reform and Development, Department of Planning and Construction, Department of Public Affairs and Department of Safety Supervision. After that, some agencies like the Public Security were added.

On 22 February 2018, Xi chaired a meeting of the Politburo Standing Committee to hear a report on the planning and preparation work for the construction of the Hung'an New Are, approving the planning framework in principle. On 14 April 2018, "Outline Planning of Hebei Xiong'an New Area" was approved by the Central Committee of the Chinese Communist Party and the State Council. On 21 April, China's official Xinhua News Agency released the planning guidelines for the project, which specify that the city is planned to be erected by 2035 and to be completed by the mid-21st century. According to the guidelines, it is aiming to be a high-level socialist modern city that will be environmentally friendly and be connected by the high-speed rail network that will take 20 minutes to travel to the new Beijing airport and 30 minutes to Beijing and Tianjin. On 25 December, "The Master Plan of Hebei Xiong'an New Area (2018–2035)" was approved by the State Council.

On 4 January 2019, the Standing Committee of the People's Congress of Hebei Province approved the appointment of Liu Guanghui as chairman, Member of the Judiciary Committee, and Judge of the People's Court and Ji Zhiming as the chief prosecutor of the Xiong'an Procuratorate. Xu Yaotong, a professor at the National School of Administration, believed that Xiong'an New Area may be transformed into an administrative unit of Hebei Provincial Government in the future. On 7 May 2019, resettlement work in Xiong'an officially started. On 2 August 2019, the State Council approved the establishment of the China (Hebei) Pilot Free Trade Zone, which included Xiong'an.

On 29 July 2021, the "Hebei Xiong'an New Area Regulations" (河北雄安新区条例) was adopted at the 24th meeting of the Standing Committee of the Hebei People's Congress, stipulating that the Xiong'an New Area Management Committee is an agency directly under the Government of Hebei Province. This committee exercises economic and social management powers granted by the state and Hebei province. The regulations were officially implemented on 1 September 2021.

== Politics ==
Xiong'an's development is a state-led project with limited non-state participation. Xiong'an is the product of strong political will and is intended to demonstrate a paradigm shift in China's approach to urban development and to mark the political era of Xi Jinping. It has therefore received the highest levels of state support in terms of planning, resources, and political commitment. Xu Kuangdi is Xi's lead advisor for the development of Xiong'an, as of at least 2023.

=== Administrative division ===
The planning scope of the Xiong'an New Area covers the 3 counties of Xiong, Rongcheng, and Anxin in Hebei Province and some surrounding areas. The planning and construction will take a specific area as the starting area (about 100 square kilometers) for development. The medium-term development area is about 200 square kilometers and the long-term area is about 2,000 square kilometers.

Map
Division code	English name	Simp. Chinese	Pinyin	Area in km^{2}	Seat	Postal code	Divisions			
Division code	English name	Simp. Chinese	Pinyin	Area in km^{2}	Seat	Postal code	Towns	Townships	Residential communities	Villages
	Xiong'an New Area	雄安新区	Xióng'ān Xīnqū	1770	Rongcheng County		20(+2)	9(+2)	16	557(+110)
130629	Rongcheng County	容城县	Róngchéng Xiàn	311	Rongcheng (容城镇)	071700	5	3	4	127
130632	Anxin County	安新县	Ānxīn Xiàn	728	Anxin (安新镇)	071600	9	3(+1)	5	207(+16)
130638	Xiong County	雄县	Xióng Xiàn	513	Xiongzhou (雄州镇)	071800	6(+2)	3(+1)	7	223(+94)
Note: Longhua Township of Gaoyang County is under Anxin County's jurisdiction, Maozhou town, Gougezhuang town, & Qijianfang Township of Renqiu city (Cangzhou city) is under Xiong County's jurisdiction.

== Transportation ==
=== Railway ===
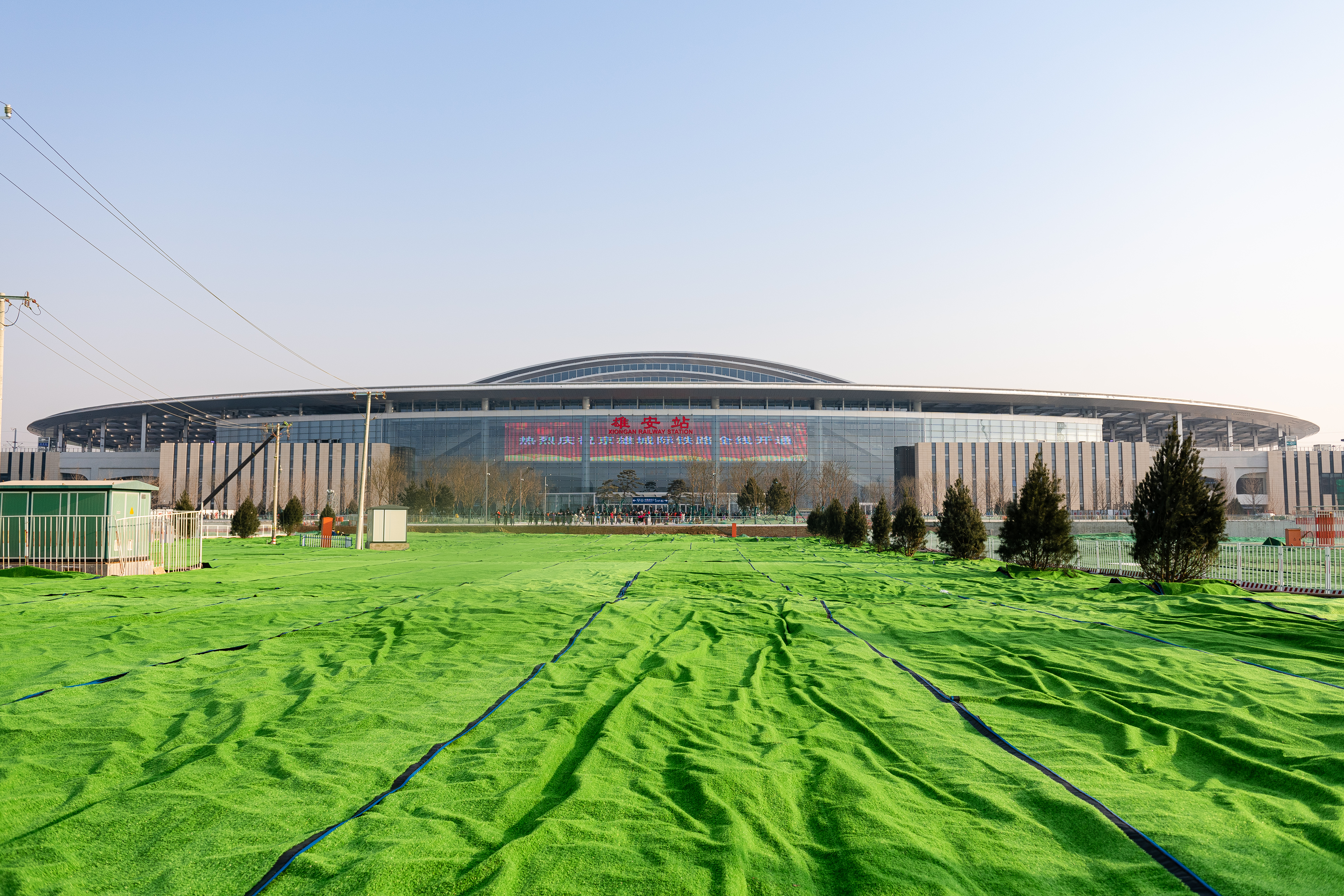
Xiong'an railway station on Beijing–Xiong'an intercity railway

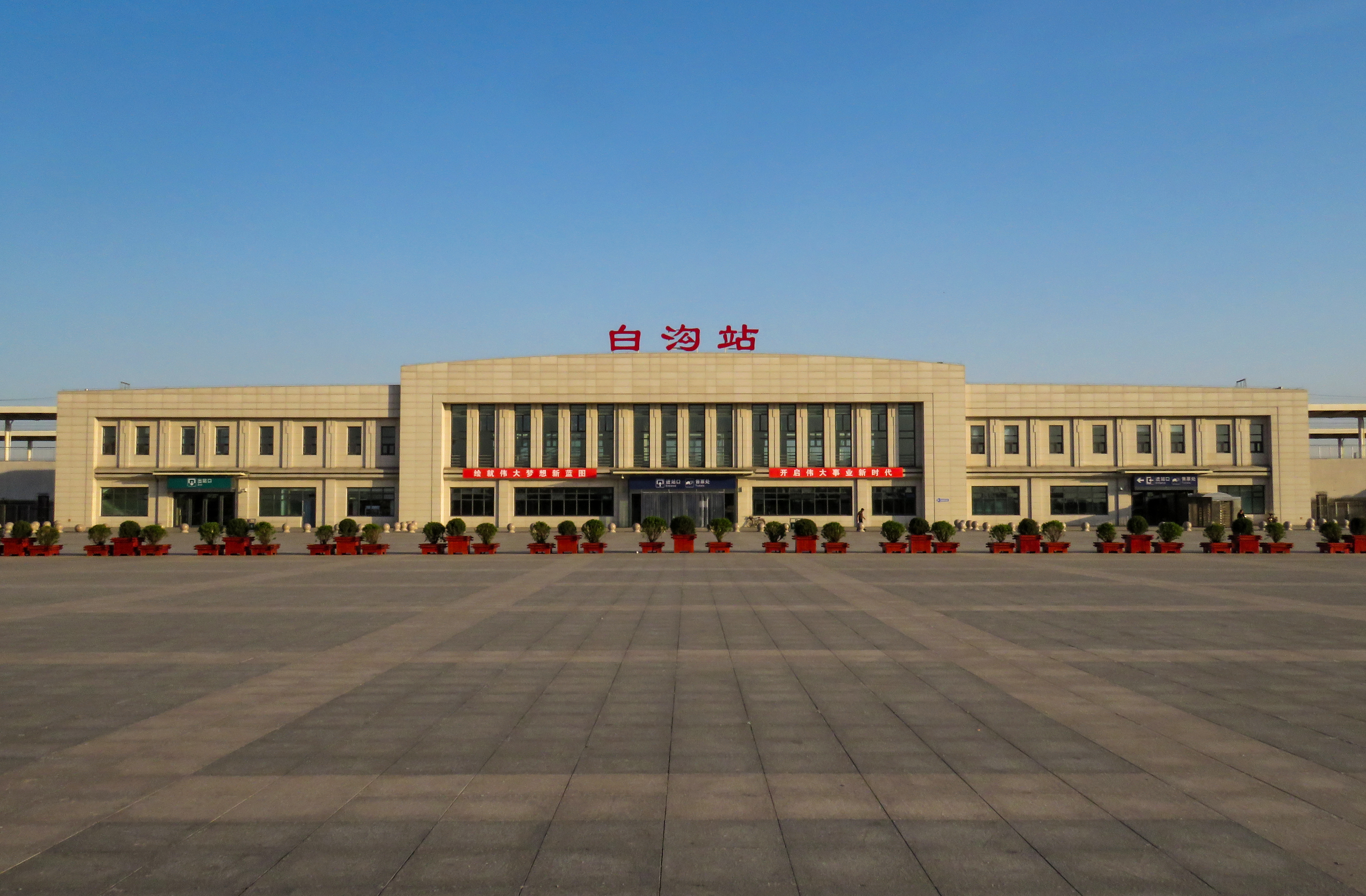
Baigou railway station on Tianjin–Baoding intercity railway

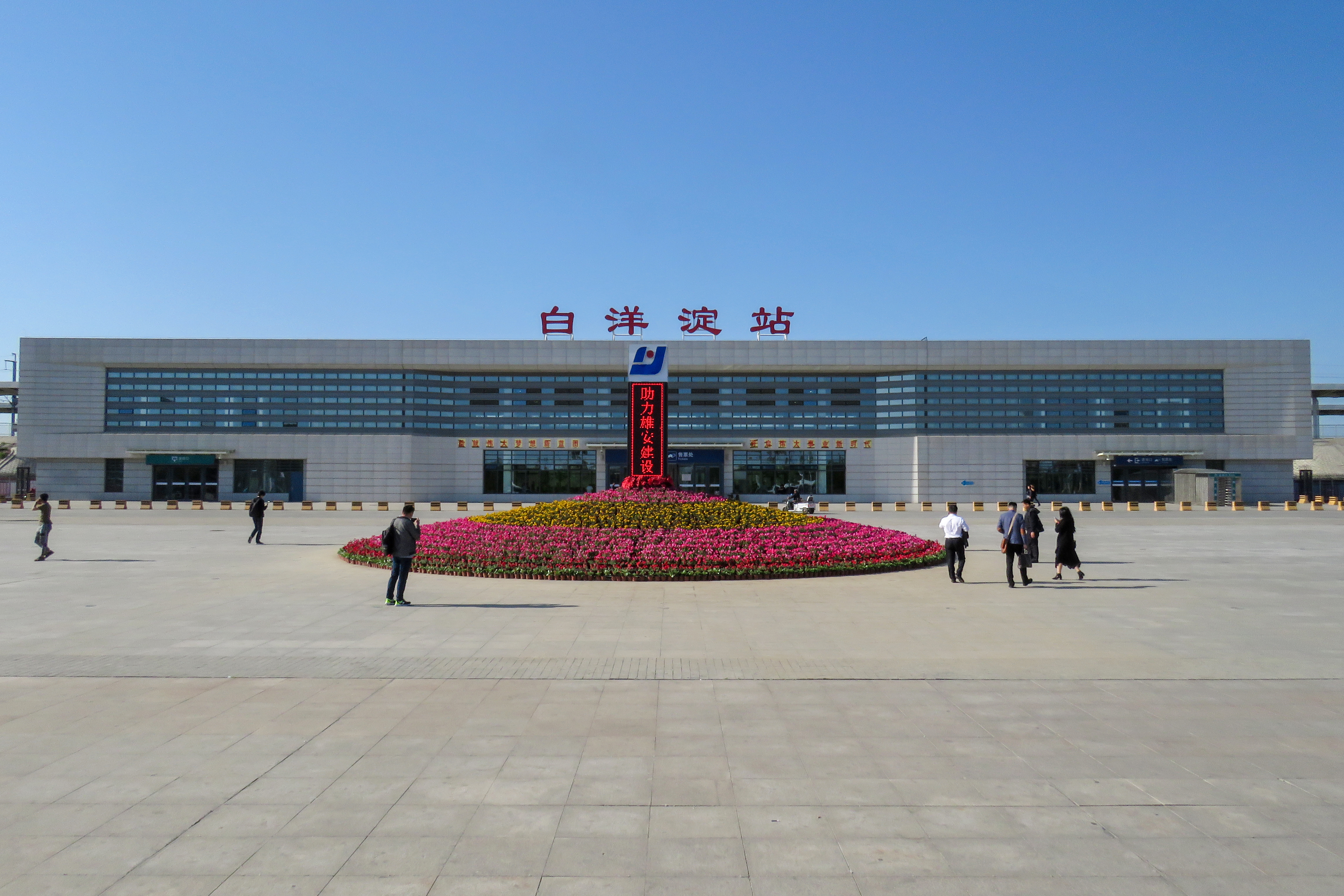
Baiyangdian railway station on Tianjin–Baoding intercity railway

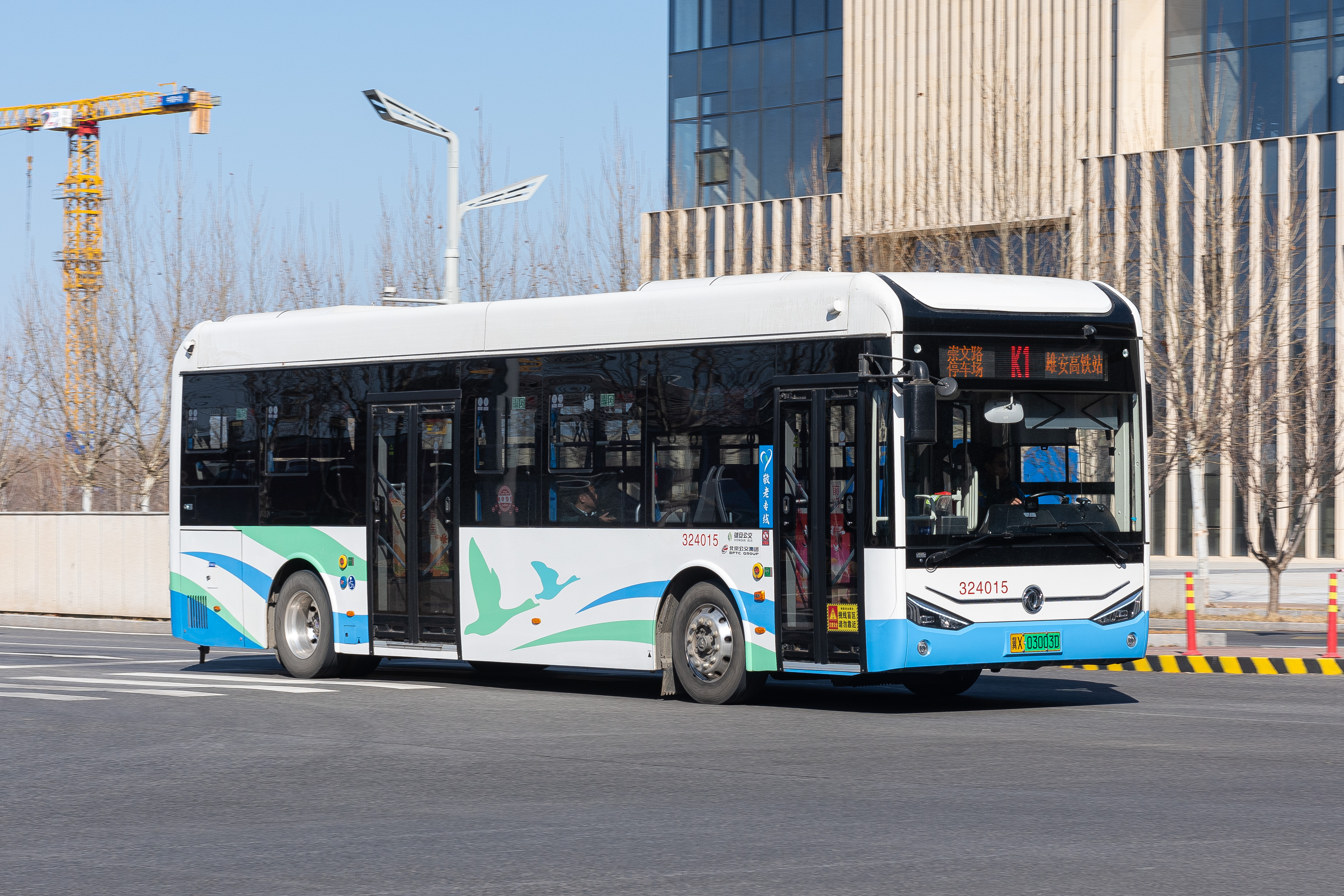
A local bus within Xiong'an

Xiong'an railway station, on the Beijing–Xiong'an intercity railway, was opened on 27 December 2020.

Baigou railway station and Baiyangdian railway station, on Tianjin–Baoding intercity railway, are within reach.

=== Airport ===
Beijing Daxing International Airport (opened in 2019) serves the area. It takes approximately 20 minutes to reach from Xiong'an by high speed rail.

=== Expressway ===
It is currently served by two national expressways, G45 and G18, as well as two regional expressways, S3601 and S3700.

== Economy ==
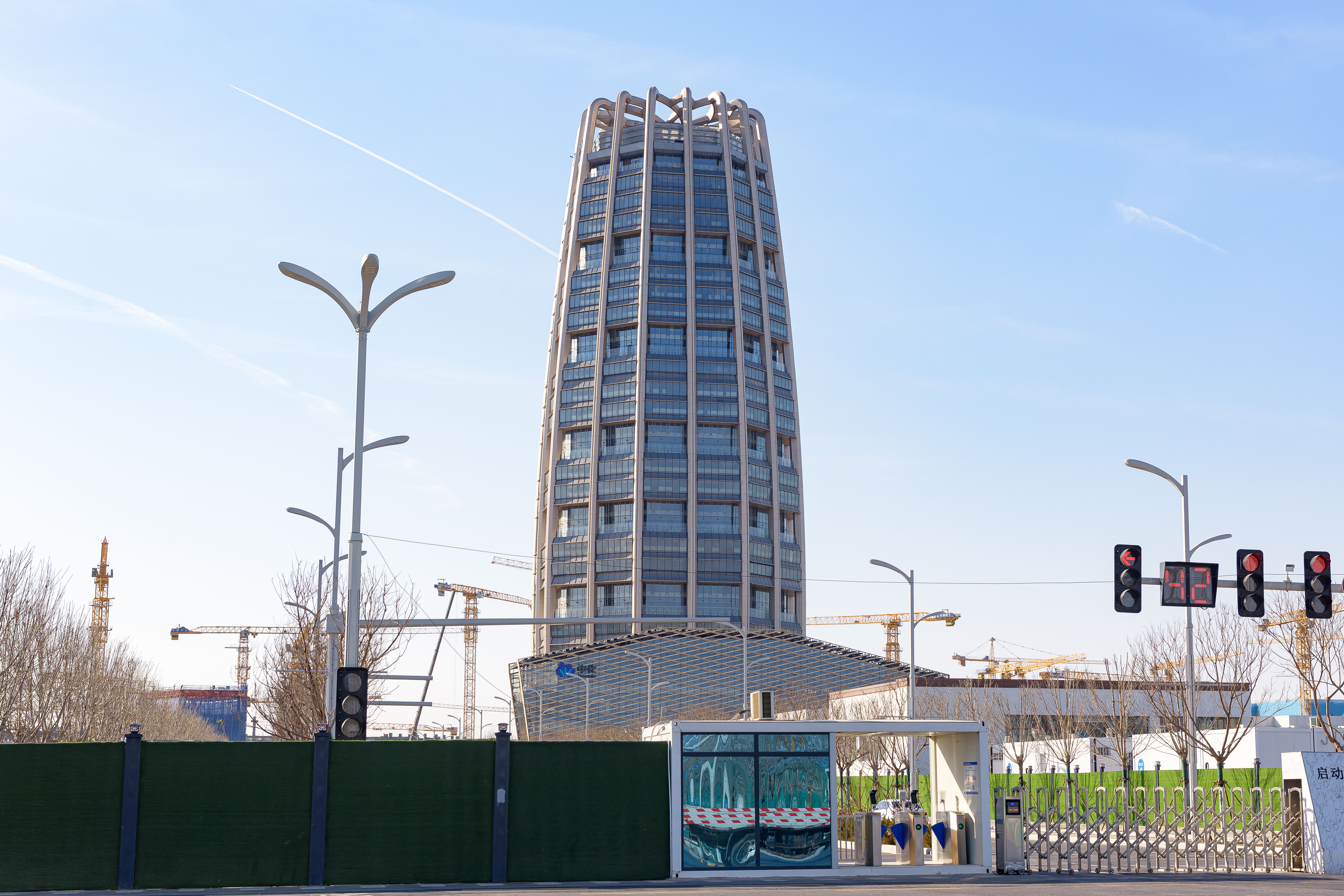
New headquarters of Sinochem in Xiong'an

Since its establishment, various state-owned enterprises (SOEs) have begun constructing offices in the area. Foreign investment is not being sought; China intends for Xiong'an to be an economic centre for state-owned enterprises and other domestic enterprises. In 2024, the China Satellite Network Group became the first SOE to announce relocation from Beijing to Xiong'an, being followed by China Huaneng Group. In October 2025, Sinochem, China Huaneng Group and Beijing-Tianjin-Hebei Railway Company moved their headquarters from Beijing to Xiong'an.

As of September 2022, the area reported ¥400 billion ($57 billion) in completed investment. The development of Xiong'an is funded by the state through fiscal allocation, state bank loans, SOE investment, and intercity partnerships. Xiong'an Group, under control of the Hebei Provincial People's Government, has been created as an investment fund for the area, backed partially by the China Development Bank.

State media describes Xiong'an as the future "Shenzhen of the north". It is one of the pilot cities for the Digital Currency Electronic Payment initiative, which launched the digital renminbi.

=== Social services ===
Most hukou permits in Xiong'an are granted to staff in large state-owned enterprises, students from top universities and high-skilled workers in industries including artificial intelligence, biotech and fintech. Those who do not qualify for a local hukou will be able to apply a lottery system, which will give some local benefits and free public transportation, though these rights will run out after five years. Staff relocating from Beijing will be allowed to retain the pension benefits they had there.

In February 2025, the Xiong'an city government announced it would require companies to enrol all of their employees in state pensions and "enterprise annuities", which would be contributed to by both the companies and employees, becoming the first city in China to have employers to pay into their workers' retirement funds.

Several research centers and satellite branches of Beijing-based universities are planning to open in the area by 2025. By 2024, more than 100,000 students had relocated from universities in Beijing to Xiong'an. As of October 2025, Xiong'an has three pre-tertiary schools and one hospital.

=== Real estate ===
A flood of capital, much of it from Beijing, has been searching for properties in Xiong'an to invest, causing real estate price in this area to increase rapidly since the announcement of the New Area. In 2017, local government imposed a temporary ban on new property sales. New household registrations in some places were also stopped, and many real estate speculators were arrested by the police that year as well. The model of real estate development in the New Area may use public housing in Singapore for reference, according to a senior officer's interview on People's Daily on April 5, 2017.

Acquisition of land for residential development in Xiong'an has used an approach termed the "new urbanization dividend distribution mechanism." Farmers whose land is acquired for future residential development become shareholders of urban development with the government and developers. Via the new urbanization dividend distribution mechanism, they receive benefits annually. Those buying property in Xiong'an are required to hold a Beijing or Xiong'an hukou, or have contributed to the local social-security system for at least five years. Property buyers must enter a lottery system, and workers need permission from their employers. Property owners in Xiong'an are prohibited from buying property in other parts of China.

On September 21, 2023, the housing administration center of Xiong'an announced that all homes in the city must be built before they are sold, a major departure from the model throughout China where customers could buy houses from property developers before they were built.

== Demographics ==
According to the 2020 Chinese census, the permanent population of Xiongan New Area was 1,205,440, the permanent population of Xiong County was 478,553, the permanent population of Rongcheng County was 273,164, and the permanent population of Anxin County was 453,723. In addition to the Han nationality, there are 45 ethnic minorities in Xiong'an, including Manchu, Hui, Mongolian, Zhuang, and Korean. The floating population was 187,330. Among the floating population, 59,172 were inter-provincial migrants and 128,158 were intra-provincial migrants. In 2024, Xiong'an's population was estimated to be 1.36 million.

On November 1, 2023, it was announced that Xiong'an's household registration code was to be "133100". In the future, the address on the identity card of Xiong'an residents will be unified into the format of "Hebei Xiongan New Area + the county or district where they are located"; the citizen ID card number of newborns registered in Xiongan New Area will also start with "133100", and the ID card numbers of other local residents will remain unchanged; existing identity cards can still be used normally within the validity period without the need for replacement.
