= Baoding railway station =

Railway station in Hebei, China

Baoding Railway Station 保定站
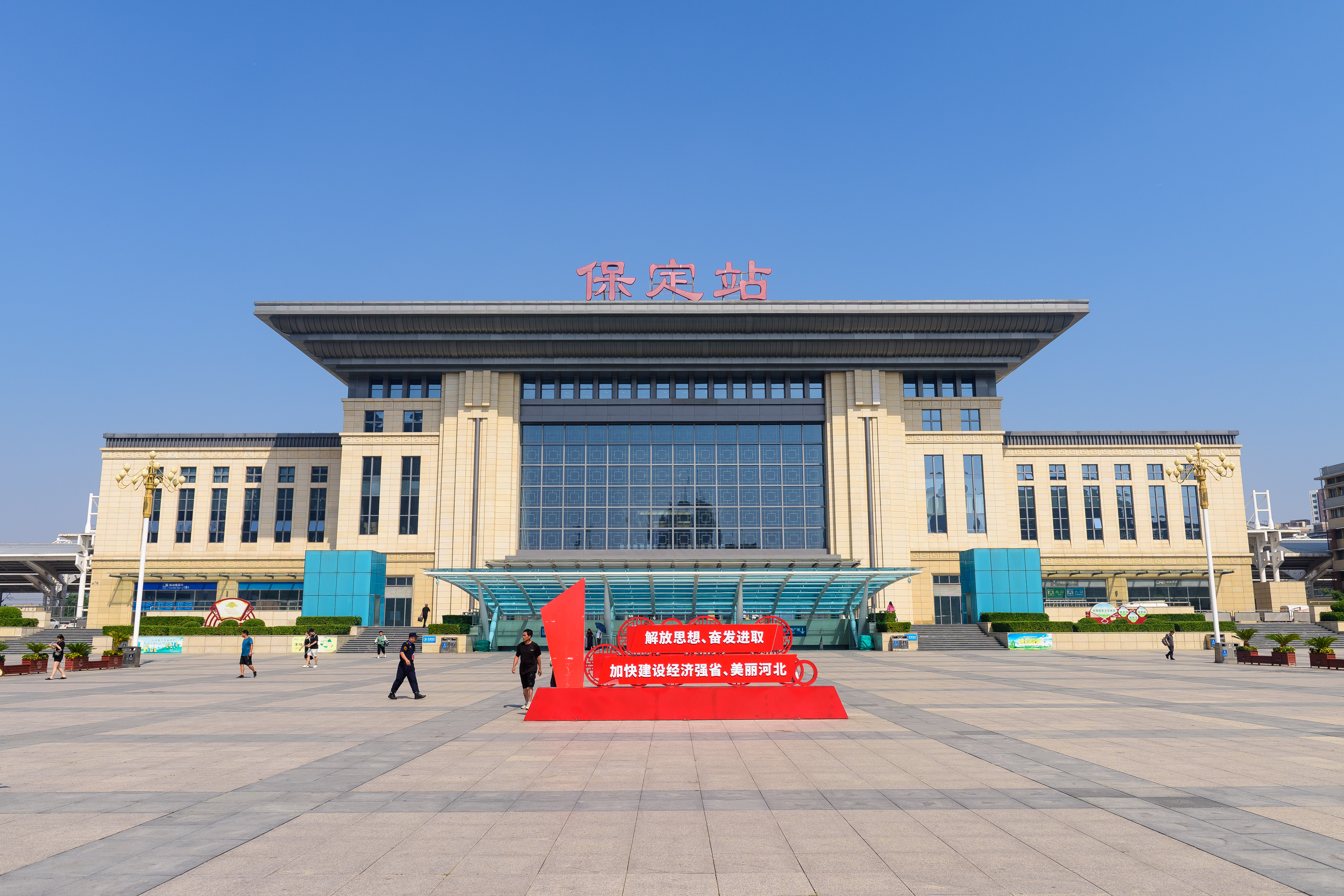
- East station building / entrance

General information
- Location: Xinshi District, Baoding, Hebei; China
- Coordinates: 38°51′42″N 115°28′28″E
- Operator: CR Beijing
- Lines: Beijing–Guangzhou railway; Tianjin–Baoding intercity railway
- Platforms: 8 (3 island platforms and 2 side platforms)
- Tracks: 10
- Connections: Bus terminal

Other information
- Station code: 20306 (TMIS code); BDP (telegraph code); BDI (Pinyin code)
- Classification: Class 1 station (一等站)

History
- Opened: 1899

Services
Preceding station	China Railway	Following station
Xushui towards Beijing West	Beijing–Guangzhou railway	Dingzhou towards Guangzhou
Preceding station	China Railway High-speed	Following station
Xushui towards Tianjin West	Tianjin–Baoding intercity railway	Terminus
Location
- Location within Hebei Location within China

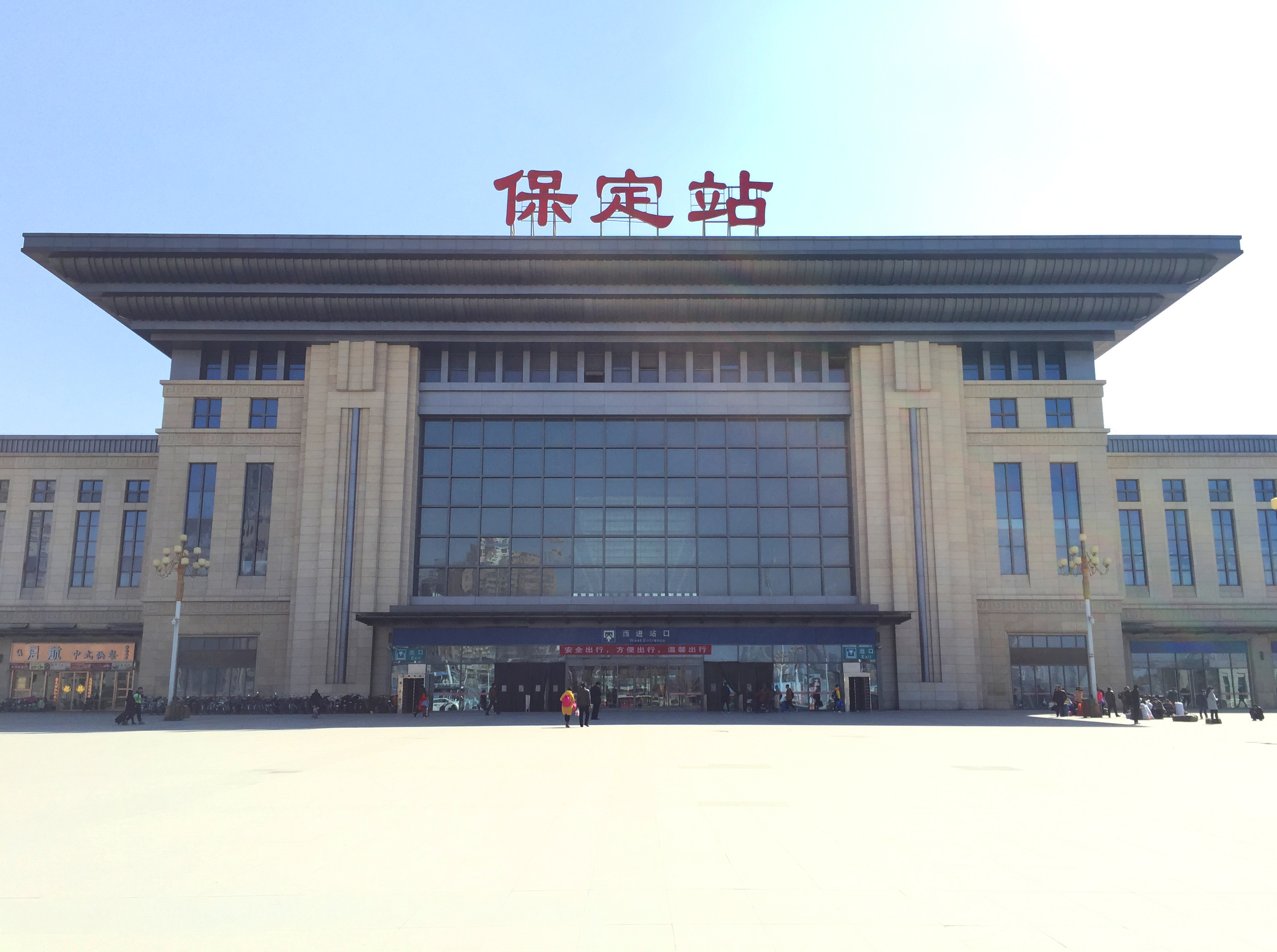
West facade in 2016

Baoding railway station (Chinese: 保定站) is a railway station located on Beijing–Guangzhou railway and Tianjin–Baoding intercity railway in Baoding, Hebei, China. The station is a Class 1 station administered and operated by China Railway Beijing Group. About 120 trains, of both non-high-speed and high speed, stop at this station every day.

== History ==
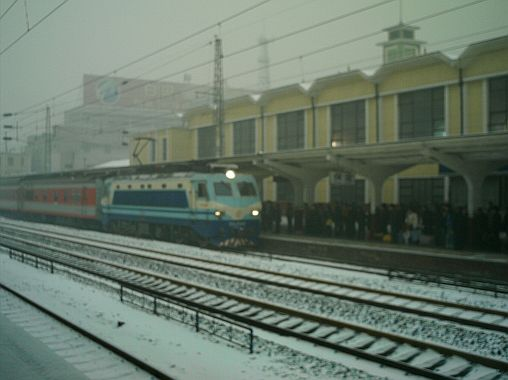
Platform of the station in 2007

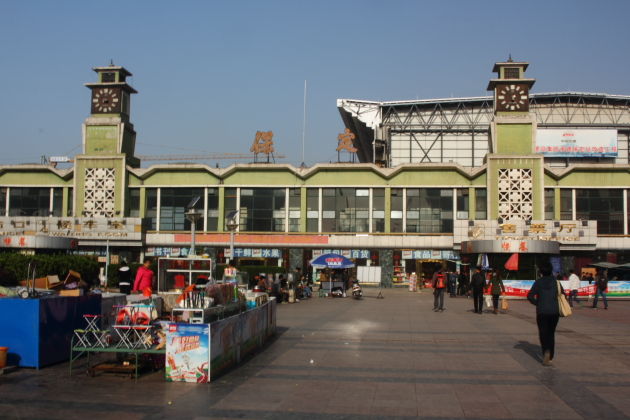
The former east station building, which was completed in 1972 and demolished in 2013.

In April 1897, construction of the Lugou Bridge–Baoding section of the Luhan Railway (also known as Jinghan Railway, now the northern section of Beijing–Guangzhou railway) began. Lugou Bridge, precisely 20 km away from the City of Beijing, was chosen as the starting point of the railway because the Empress Dowager Cixi forbid the construction of railroads within 20 km from the City of Beijing. This section of the railway, called the Lubao section, was 132.7 km long, and was the first section of the Luhan Railway. Track-laying was completed in January 1899. On 22 January 1899, Baodingfu Station (Chinese: 保定府车站) was opened, and the section of the railway began operation on 1 February. At its opening, the station consisted of a waiting hall, a ticket office and a simple footbridge for passenger service. It also had a freight yard, which consisted of a storeroom, platform and tracks for freight service. Notably, in the early days of the station, passenger trains ran only during the day and would stop for the night. Passengers would unload, and then board the train the next morning to continue the journey. Day-and-night train service was introduced to the station in 1913.

Because China's railway construction heavily relied on money loaned from foreign countries at that time, funds were often insufficient. The tracks for the station were imported from countries including France, Germany, Japan, and United Kingdom. The locomotives that ran the section were all imported steam locomotives, and models were inconsistent. The average speed on the railway was about 20–30 km/h, thus rendering the journey time from Baoding to Beijing nearly five hours.

After the Marco Polo Bridge incident of 1937, Baodingfu Station was renamed Qingyuan County Station (Chinese: 清苑县车站). After the Second Sino-Japanese War, the station was renamed to the current name. On 22 November 1948, the city of Baoding was changed to under the communist rule, after the communist victory in the Pingjin Campaign of the Chinese Civil War. Railways from Beijing (then Peiping) to Baoding and from Baoding to Shijiazhuang were repaired. Workers labored over the reparation effort for about half a year. After 1 year and 7 months' stoppage in service, the Lubao Railway was completely and successfully repaired, 37 days ahead of schedule. A total number of 991,000 passengers and 2,790 freight trains with 73,000 tonnes of goods were transported in that year.

In 1972, the east station building was opened.

On 29 December 2012, the west station building was opened, and the east station building was closed for renovation. The former east station building was demolished in 2013 to make room for the new east station building. On October 1, 2018, the east square of Baoding Railway Station was officially put into use, and the east station building of the railway station was also opened at the same time.
