= Tianjin–Baoding intercity railway =

Railway line in China

Tianjin-Baoding intercity railway
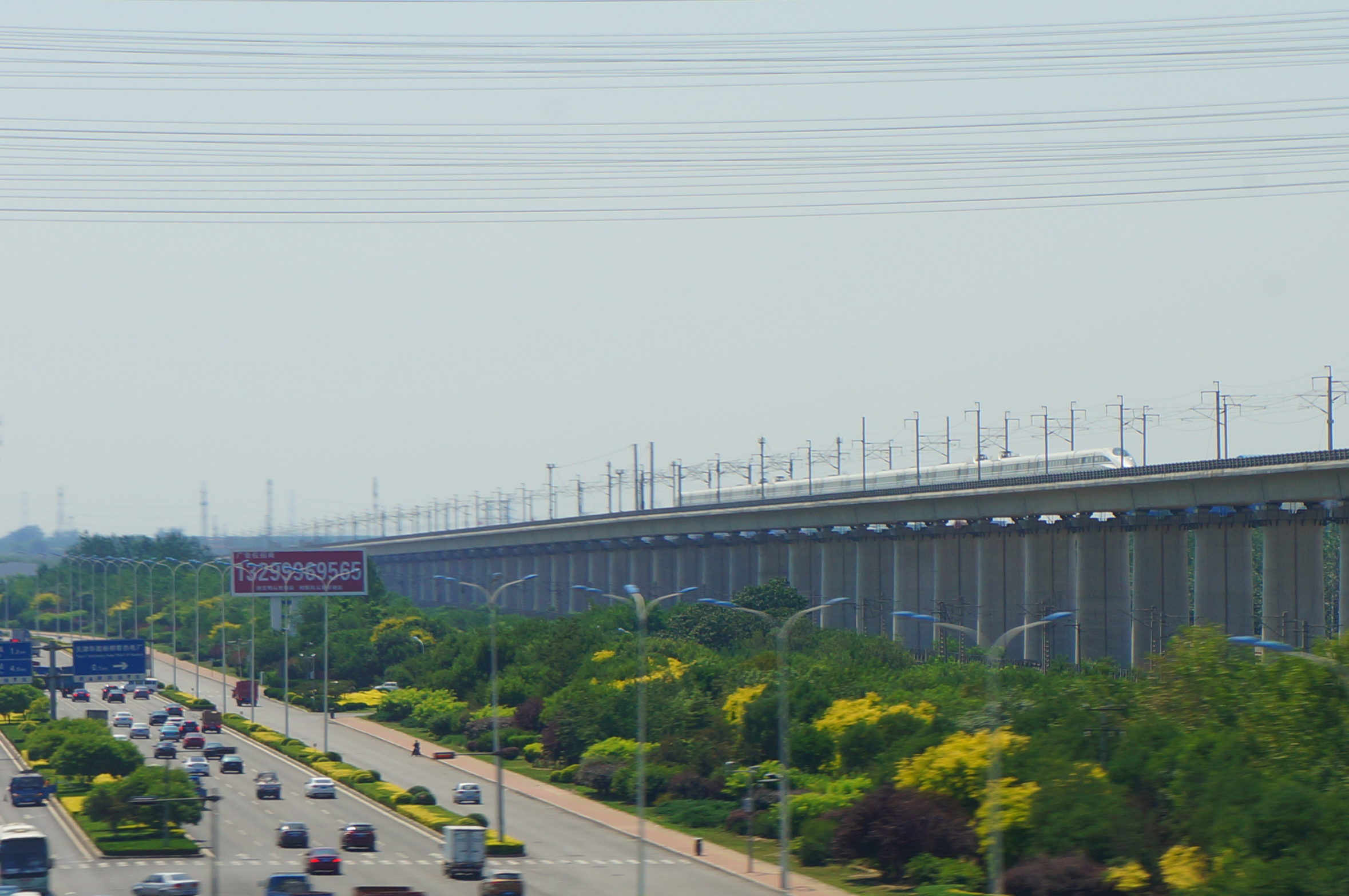
- A CRH380AL EMU running on the railway

Overview
- Native name: 津保铁路 霸徐铁路 津霸客运专线
- Status: Operational
- Owner: CR Beijing
- Locale: Tianjin; Hebei province
- Termini: Tianjin West; Baoding
- Stations: 7

Service
- Type: High-speed rail
- System: China Railway High-speed
- Services: 1
- Operator: CR Beijing

History
- Opened: December 28, 2015; 10 years ago

Technical
- Line length: 157.925 km (98 mi)
- Number of tracks: 2 (Double-track)
- Track gauge: 1,435 mm (4 ft 8 1/2 in) standard gauge
- Electrification: 25 kV 50 Hz AC (Overhead line)
- Operating speed: 250 km/h (160 mph)

Tianjin–Baoding intercity railway, also known as Tianjin-Baoding Passenger Line, is a high-speed railway line connecting Tianjin with Baoding in Hebei province. Starting from Tianjin West railway station and ending at Baoding railway station, the railway length is 158 km (98 mi) and with a maximum design speed of 250 km/h (160 mph). The project was jointly developed by the Ministry of Railways, Tianjin and Hebei Provincial Governments, supplying a total investment of 24 billion yuan. Construction began in March 2010 and the original plan was to be opened to traffic in 2013, however the progress of construction has experienced numerous work stoppages with completion delayed until December 28, 2015. Future high speed rail connections have been proposed such as a branch to the new Beijing Daxing International Airport, allowing this airport to better serve the greater Beijing-Tianjin-Hebei region.

== Profile ==
The line connects Tianjin West station and Baoding station in Hebei. Its construction included short sections and connections to the Beijing-Guangzhou HSR, the Beijing–Kowloon Railway, Beijing–Shanghai Railway, Beijing-Shanghai HSR and other ancillary works. It consists of a total of 157.925 km (98.130 mi) of railway line, 133.006 km (82.646 mi) of new trackage and using existing lines for a distance of 24.919 km (15.484 mi). Stations located along the route are Tianjin West, Shengfang, Bazhou West, Baigou, Baiyangdian, Xushui and ending at Baoding. 65.4% of the line is on an elevated viaduct.

== Construction ==
- November 8, 2008 - the Ministry of Railways, Tianjin and Hebei Provincial government tripartite released the "Speed up the construction of the railway from Tianjin to Baoding Minutes" at a signing ceremony, clears the way for construction of the Tianjin–Baoding intercity railway. Which at full-length, will be 145 km (90 mi), with a total investment of 24 billion yuan estimate. It was expected to start in the first half of 2009, however, consultation had not yet started for construction to begin on schedule.
- March 17, 2010 - Tianjin Municipal Government, said that after the enthusiasm, the National Development and Reform Commission officially approved the Tianjin-Baoding railway project approved.
- March 2010 - Officially started construction, with an expectation to be completed in 2013, will be realized from Tianjin to Baoding accessible within one hour.
- December 28, 2015 - Opened to traffic

=== Work stoppages ===
- July 23, 2011 - In the event of the Wenzhou train collision, the Ministry of Railways called for all railway construction, investment and other works regarding to high-speed rail to be halted, pending further reviews. Thus Ministry of Railways investment for this railway was halted and it fell into a suspended state.
- March 2012, Construction was fully resumed, originally scheduled for completion in 2013 but now delayed until 2015.
