= Tianjin West railway station =

Railway station in Tianjin, China

Tianjinxi 天津西
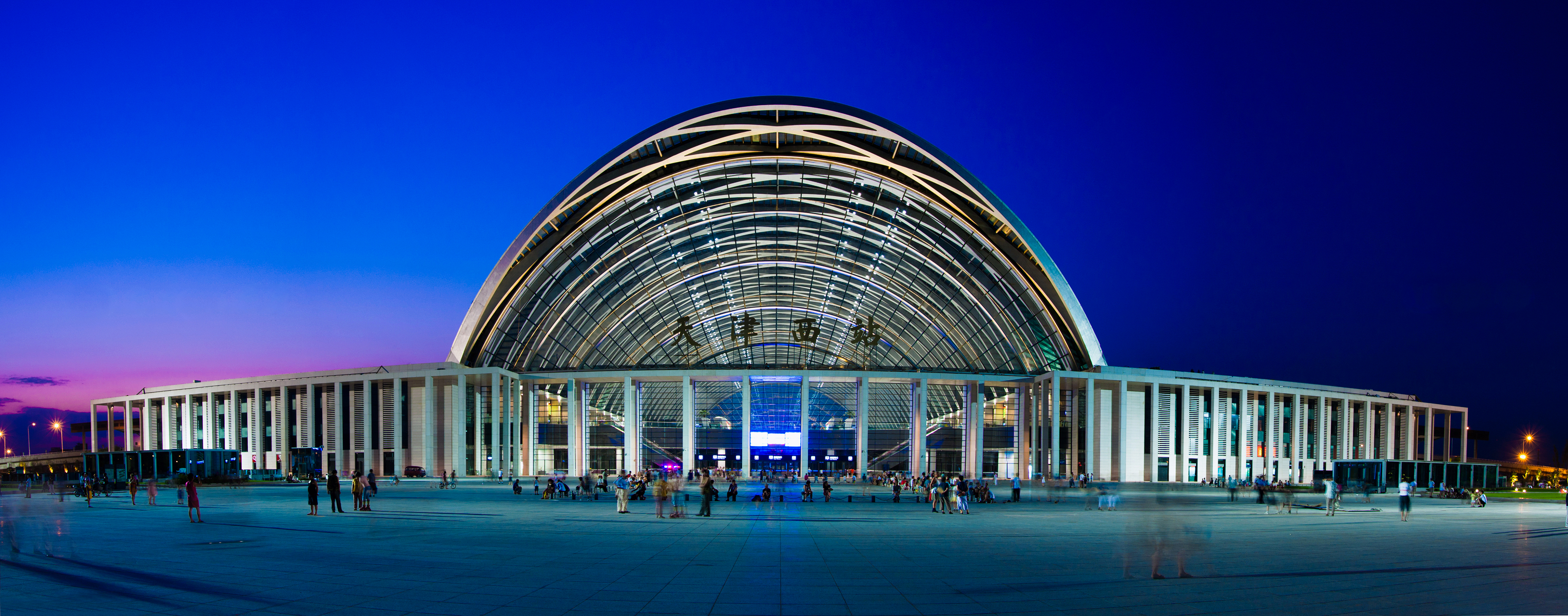
- New Tianjin West Railway Station

General information
- Location: Beiyingmen Ximalu, Hongqiao District, Tianjin; China
- Coordinates: 39°9′26″N 117°9′40″E
- Operator: Beijing Railway Bureau; China Railway Corporation
- Lines: Beijing–Shanghai railway Tianjin–Baoding ICR; Beijing–Shanghai HSR; Tianjin–Qinhuangdao HSR
- Platforms: 24
- Connections: Bus terminal

Other information
- Station code: TMIS code: 16010; Telegraph code: TXP; Pinyin code: TJX
- Classification: Top Class station

History
- Opened: 1910
Services
Preceding station	China Railway High-speed	Following station
Terminus	Beijing–Shanghai high-speed railway Part of the Beijing–Taipei High-Speed Rail Corridor	Tianjin South towards Shanghai Hongqiao
Terminus	Tianjin–Qinhuangdao high-speed railway Part of the Tianjin–Shenyang High-Speed Railway	Tianjin towards Qinhuangdao
Terminus	Tianjin–Baoding intercity railway	Shengfang towards Baoding
Nancang towards Beijing	Beijing–Shanghai high-speed railway	Caozhuang towards Shanghai Hongqiao
Shengfang towards Daxing Airport	Tianjin–Daxing Airport intercity railway	Terminus

Metro
Preceding station	Tianjin Metro	Following station
Xibeijiao towards Shuangqiaohe	Line 1	Honghuli towards Liuyuan
Tongchengshangwuquxiyuzhuang towards Xiaojie	Line 4	Hebeidajie Under planning towards Xinxingcun
Beizhulin towards Nansunzhuang	Line 6	Fuxinglu towards Lushuidao
Location

The Tianjinxi (West) Railway Station (Chinese: 天津西站; pinyin: Tiānjīnxī zhàn) is a high-speed railway station in Tianjin. It is served by the Beijing–Shanghai railway and Tianjin–Baoding ICR and by the Beijing–Shanghai HSR.

== Expansion Project ==
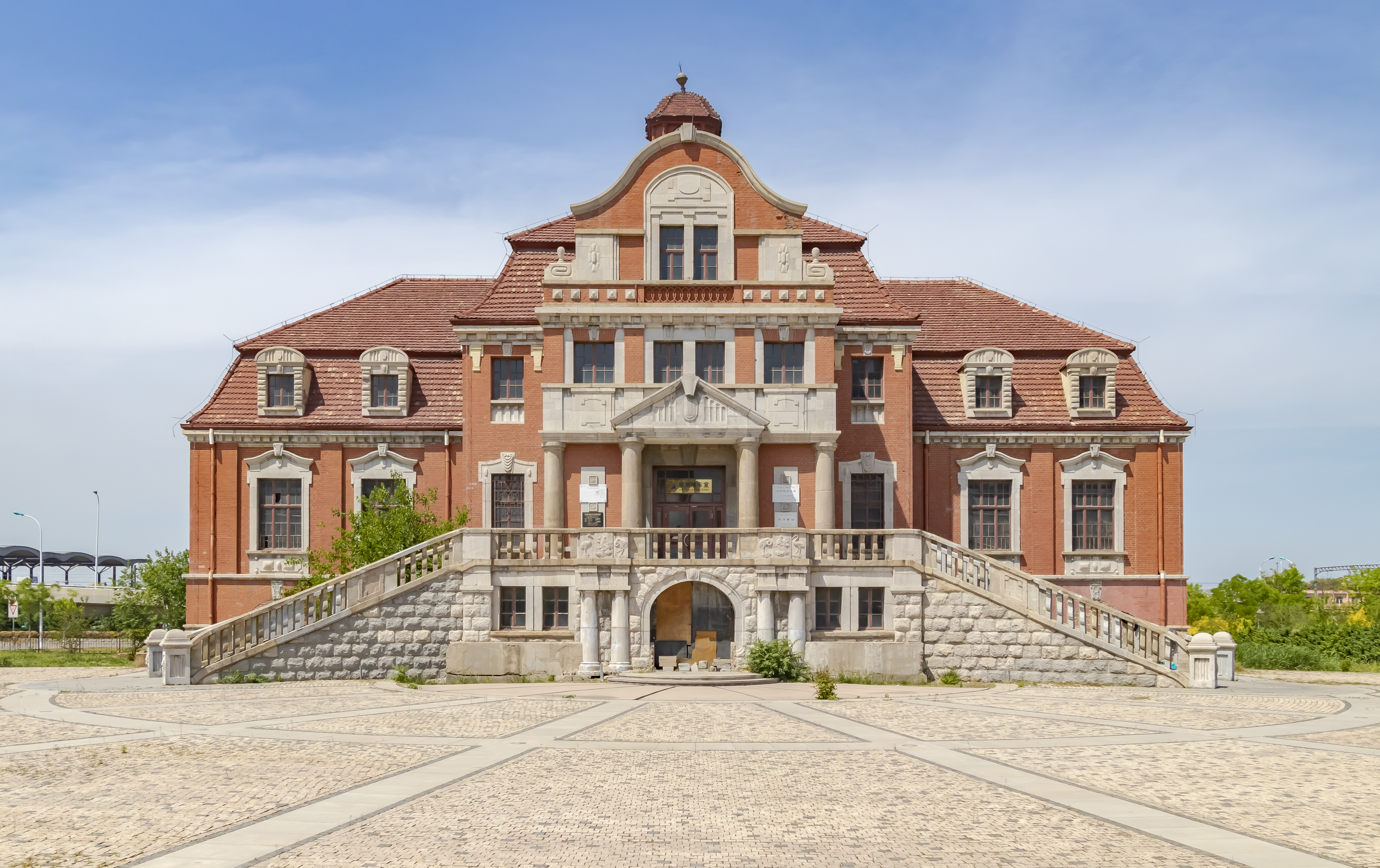
Old Tianjin West Railway Station, built in 1910.

In 2008, renovation and expansion works of the station began, in tandem with the construction of the Beijing-Shanghai high speed railway. After the completion of the Beijing–Shanghai high-speed railway, and in anticipation for services of the Beijing–Tianjin intercity railway, Tianjin West's platforms were increased from 13 to 24. These include 9 high-speed platforms with 17 railway lines.

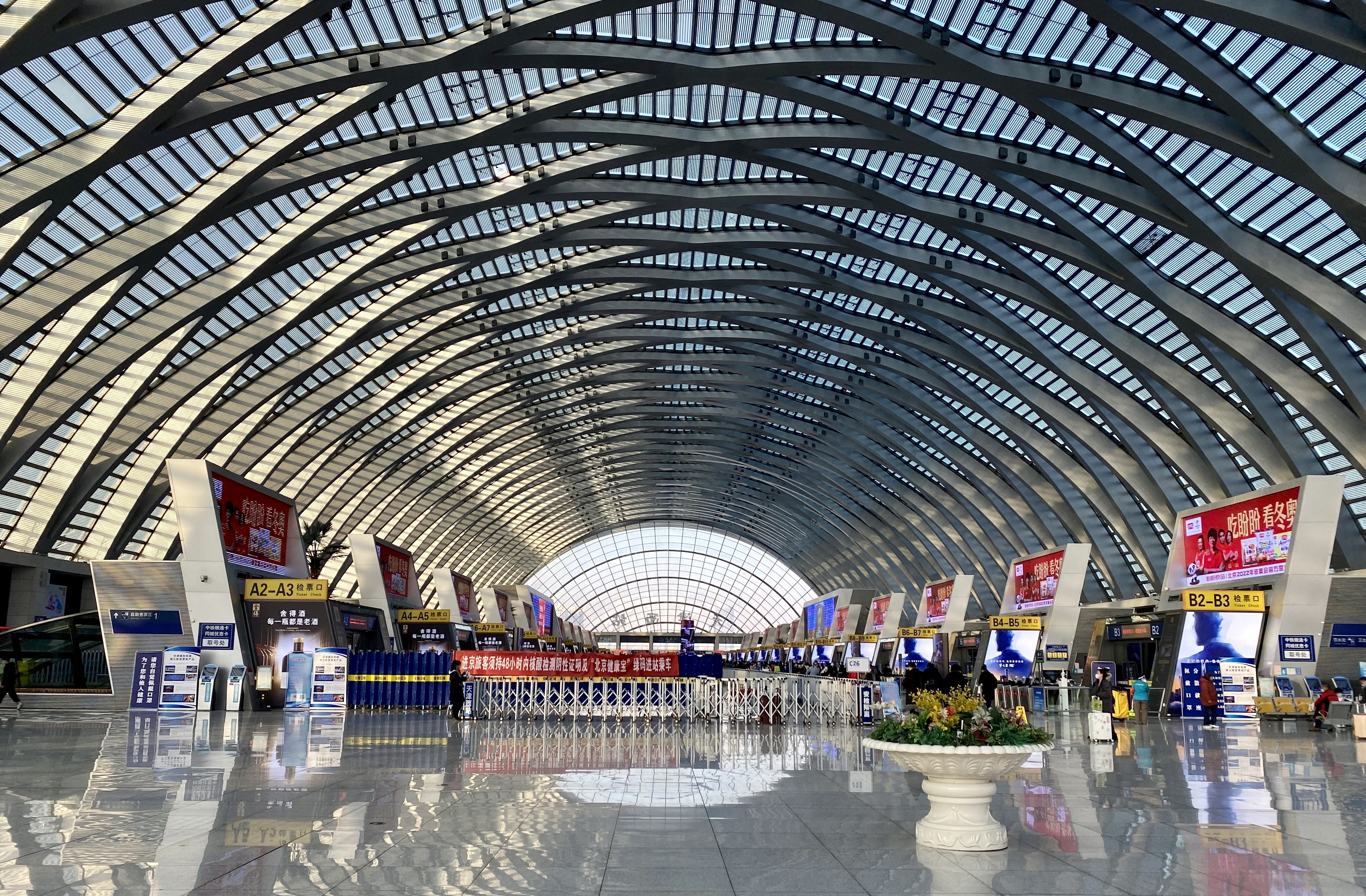
Inside View of Tianjin West Railway Station in 2021

The reconstruction of the station building involved the creation of a new main station building with a larger waiting room, a new North-South underground connection square, baggage check-in points, and facilitated access. The new Tianjin West station can be reached by bus, metro (Tianjin Metro Line 1, 4, 6), taxi, or on foot. Tianjin West Railway Station will replace the main Tianjin railway station to become the largest transportation hub of the city of Tianjin. The station was designed by the internationally renowned architectural firm Gerkan, Marg and Partners and was officially opened in summer 2011. The operation is part of a massive urban renovation project of the north area of Tianjin that will bring the station in the centre of a new residential and commercial development.

== Metro connection ==
The railway station is served by Lines 1, 4 and 6 of the Tianjin Metro: the metro station is called Xizhan (Chinese: 西站).

Xizhan was part of the original metro line, which operated in regular service from 28 December 1984 until 9 October 2001: it was rebuilt and reopened with the upgraded Line 1 on 12 June 2006.

== See also ==
- Tianjin railway station
- Tianjin North railway station
- Tianjin South railway station
