= Tianjin South railway station =

Railway station in Tianjin, China

Tianjinnan 天津南
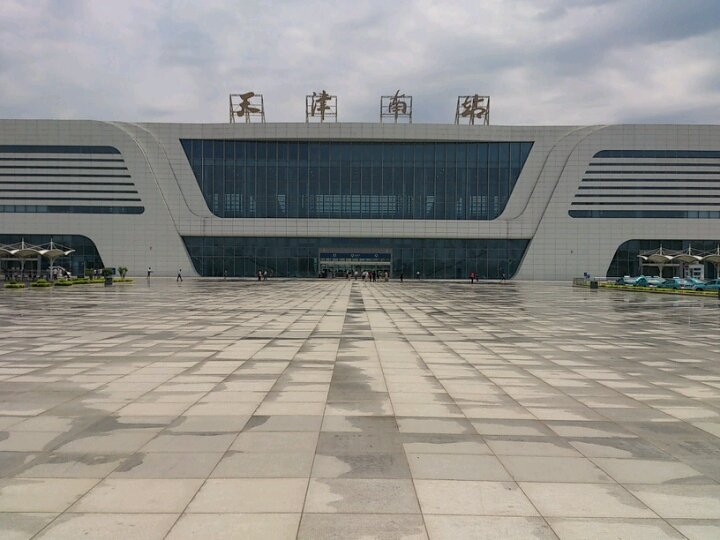

General information
- Other names: Tianjin South
- Location: Xiqing District, Tianjin; China
- Coordinates: 39°03′21″N 117°03′18″E
- Operated by: Beijing Railway Bureau; China Railway Corporation
- Line: Beijing–Shanghai high-speed railway
- Platforms: 2
- Connections: Tianjin Metro: Nanzhan

Other information
- Station code: TMIS code: 66803; Telegraph code: TIP; Pinyin code: TJN

History
- Opened: June 30, 2011

Services
Preceding station	China Railway High-speed	Following station
Langfang towards Beijing South	Beijing–Shanghai high-speed railway Part of the Beijing–Taipei High-Speed Rail Corridor	Cangzhou West towards Shanghai Hongqiao
Tianjin West Terminus	Beijing–Shanghai high-speed railway Part of the Beijing–Taipei High-Speed Rail Corridor	Cangzhou West towards Shanghai Hongqiao
Location

Tianjin South railway station (Chinese: 天津南站; pinyin: Tiānjīn Nán zhàn) is a high-speed railway station in Xiqing District, Tianjin, China. It is served by some trains on the Beijing–Shanghai high-speed railway.

This station is built as an elevated station and is part of the Tianjin Grand Bridge.

== Station layout ==
Platforms 1 and 2 are used for trains headed for the Beijing South railway station; platforms 3 and 4 are used for trains to Jinan, Qingdao and Shanghai Hongqiao. Two tracks in the middle of the station allow for trains running direct services to continue at full speed without stopping. Trains stopping at this station will not stop at the Tianjin West railway station. Departing passengers will use Ticket Check 1 for trains to Beijing, and Ticket Check 2 for trains to Qingdao and Shanghai.

The station is so built that the ticket office, station concourse and shops are located right underneath the elevated platforms. The waiting hall is capable of holding up to 1,000 passengers at any one time. The square in front of the station is to the west of the station building.

== See also ==
- Tianjin Metro
