= List of longest bridges =

Satellite view of the Lake Pontchartrain Causeway in southeast Louisiana. Reported by Guinness World Records as the longest continuous bridge over water. The Manchac Swamp Bridge can be seen on the left

This is a list of the world's longest bridges that are more than 3 kilometers (1.9 mi) in length sorted by their full length above land and water. The main span is the longest span without any ground support.

There is no standard way to measure the total length of a bridge. Some bridges are measured from the beginning of the entrance ramp to the end of the exit ramp. Some are measured from shoreline to shoreline. Others use the length of the total construction involved in building the bridge. Since there is no standard, no ranking of a bridge should be assumed from its stated length.

Numbers are merely estimates and measures in feet may be imprecise due to conversion rounding.

== Completed ==
Name	Length		Main span		Completed	Traffic	Country	Notes
Name	m	ft	m	ft	Completed	Traffic	Country	Notes
Danyang–Kunshan Grand Bridge; Beijing–Shanghai High-Speed Railway	164,800	540,700	(Viaduct)		2010	High-speed rail	China	Guinness: Longest bridge (any type), 2011
Changhua–Kaohsiung Viaduct; Taiwan High Speed Rail	157,317	516,132	(Viaduct)		2004	High-speed rail	Taiwan	
Kita–Yaita Viaduct; Tōhoku Shinkansen	114,424	375,407	(Viaduct)		1982	High-speed rail	Japan	
Tianjin Grand Bridge; Beijing–Shanghai High-Speed Railway	113,700	373,000	(Viaduct)		2010	High-speed rail	China	Guinness: Second longest bridge (any type), 2011
Cangde Grand Bridge; Beijing–Shanghai High-Speed Railway	105,881	347,379	(Viaduct)		2010	High-speed rail	China	
Weinan Weihe Grand Bridge; Zhengxi Passenger Railway	79,732	261,588	(Viaduct)		2008	High-speed rail	China	
Burapha Withi Expressway	54,000	177,000	(Viaduct)		2000	Expressway	Thailand	Guinness: Longest Road Bridge, 2000
Hong Kong–Zhuhai–Macau Bridge	49,968	163,937	?		2018	Expressway	China	Bridge-tunnel system
Beijing Grand Bridge; Beijing–Shanghai High-Speed Railway	48,153	157,982	(Viaduct)		2010	High-speed rail	China	
Metro Manila Skyway System	39,200	128,600	(Viaduct)		2021	Expressway	Philippines	
Lake Pontchartrain Causeway	38,442	126,122	(Viaduct)		1956 (SB); 1969 (NB)	Highway	United States	Guinness: Longest bridge over water (continuous), 1969
Line 1, Wuhan Metro Bridge	37,788	123,976	(Viaduct)		2009	Metro	China	
Manchac Swamp Bridge	36,710	120,440	(Viaduct)		1979	Highway	United States	
Sheikh Mohammed bin Zayed Skyway	36,400	119,400	(Viaduct)		2019	Expressway	Indonesia	
Sheikh Jaber Al-Ahmad Al-Sabah Causeway (Main Link)	36,140	118,570	(Viaduct)		2019	Highway	Kuwait	
Yangcun Bridge; Beijing-Tianjin Intercity Railway	35,812	117,493	(Viaduct)		2007	High-speed rail	China	
Hangzhou Bay Bridge	35,673	117,037	448	1,470	2007	Expressway	China	
Runyang Bridge	35,660	116,990	1,490	4,890	2005	Expressway	China	
Line 1 – Lima Metro	34,600	113,500	(Viaduct)		2014	Metro	Peru	
Donghai Bridge	32,500	106,600	400	1,300	2005	Expressway	China	
Huangmaohai Sea-crossing Channel	31,220	102,430	720	2,360 (x2)	2024	Expressway	China	
Sultan Haji Omar Ali Saifuddien Bridge	30,000	98,000	260	850	2020	Highway	Brunei	
Shanghai Maglev line	29,908	98,123	(Viaduct)		2003	Maglev	China	
Delhi Metro Blue Line (Dwarka Sector 8-Rama Krishna Ashram Marg)	29,808	97,795	(Viaduct)		2010	Metro	India	
Atchafalaya Basin Bridge	29,290	96,100	(Viaduct)		1973	Highway	United States	
Yanshi Bridge; Zhengzhou–Xi'an High-Speed Railway	28,543	93,645	(Viaduct)		2009	High-speed rail	China	
Jiaozhou Bay Bridge	26,707	87,621	260	850	2011	Expressway	China	
Jintang Bridge	26,540	87,070	620	2,030	2009	Expressway	China	
Manila LRT Line 1	26,000	85,000	(Viaduct)		2024	Metro	Philippines	
Jinbin Light Rail No. 1 Bridge (Guanghualu – Babaocun)	25,800	84,600	(Viaduct)		2003	Metro	China	
East West MRT line (Redhill – Tuas Link)	25,700	84,300	(Viaduct)		2017	Metro	Singapore	
Suvarnabhumi Airport Link	24,500	80,400	(Viaduct)		2010	Rail	Thailand	
Chesapeake Bay Bridge-Tunnel	24,140	79,200	(Viaduct)		1964 (NB); 1999 (SB)	Highway	United States	
Penang Second Bridge	24,000	79,000	250	820	2014	Highway	Malaysia	
MRT Kajang Line Northern Elevated Section	23,100	75,800	(Viaduct)		2016	Metro	Malaysia	
Bridge section of Hong Kong–Zhuhai–Macau Bridge	22,900	75,100	460	1,510	2018	Expressway	China	Guinness: Longest bridge over water (aggregate), October 2018
Shenzhen-Zhongshan Bridge	22,500	73,800	1,666	5,466	2024	Expressway	China	
Liangshui River Bridge; Beijing-Tianjin Intercity Railway	21,563	70,745	(Viaduct)		2007	High-speed rail	China	
Incheon Bridge	21,380	70,140	800	2,600	2009	Highway	South Korea	
Yongding New River Bridge; Beijing-Tianjin Intercity Railway	21,133	69,334	(Viaduct)		2007	High-speed rail	China	
6th October Bridge	20,500	67,300	(Viaduct)		1996	Road	Egypt	
MRT Line 6	20,100	65,900	(Viaduct)		2022	Metro	Bangladesh	
C215 Viaduct; Taiwan High Speed Rail	20,000	66,000	(Viaduct)		2007	High-speed rail	Taiwan	
Dhaka Elevated Expressway	19,730	64,730	(Viaduct)		2023	Expressway	Bangladesh	
Hami Grade Separation Bridge; Lanzhou–Urumqi High-Speed Railway	19,300	63,300	(Viaduct)		2014	High-speed rail	China	
MRT Kajang Line Southern Elevated Section	19,000	62,000	(Viaduct)		2017	Metro	Malaysia	
Dwarka Expressway flyover	18,900	62,000	(Viaduct)		2024; 2025	Expressway	India	
Niya River Grand Bridge; Hotan–Ruoqiang railway	18,628	61,115	(Viaduct)		2022	Rail	China	
Cangzhou–Dezhou Grand Bridge; Beijing–Shanghai High-Speed Railway	18,200	59,700	128	420	2010	High-speed rail	China	
Mumbai Trans Harbour Link	18,187	59,669	180	590 (x2)	2024	Expressway	India	
Crimean Bridge (Kerch Strait)	18,100	59,400	227	745 (x2)	2018	Road and rail	Russia and Ukraine	Partially destroyed.
Aérotrain Test Track	18,000	59,000	(Viaduct)		1965	Rail (prototype)	France	No longer in use
Bonnet Carré Spillway Bridge	17,702	58,077	(Viaduct)		1972	Highway	United States	
Chittagong Elevated Expressway	16,500	54,100	(Viaduct)		2023	Expressway	Bangladesh	
Pingtan Strait Rail-Road Bridge	16,322	53,550	532	1,745	2020	Highway and rail	China	
Green line (Taichung MRT)	15,650	51,350	(Viaduct)		2020	Metro	Taiwan	
Eastern Freeway South Stretch	15,595	51,165	(Viaduct)		2013	Expressway	India	
Cross Beijing Ring Roads Bridge; Beijing-Tianjin Intercity Railway	15,595	51,165	(Viaduct)		2007	High-speed rail	China	
A3 Anse-à-l'Orme Branch; Réseau express métropolitain	14,500	47,600	(Viaduct)		2026	Metro	Canada	
Borommaratchachonnani Elevated Highway	14,000	46,000	(Viaduct)		1998	Expressway	Thailand	
Manila LRT Line 2	13,800	45,300	(Viaduct)		2004	Metro	Philippines	
Penang Bridge	13,500	44,300	225	738	1985	Highway	Malaysia	
Kam Sheung Road-Tuen Mun viaduct (part of West Rail line)	13,400	44,000	(Viaduct)		2003	Rail	Hong Kong	
Louisiana Highway 1 Bridge	13,300	43,600	(Viaduct)		2009	Highway	United States	
Rio–Niterói Bridge	13,290	43,600	300	980	1974	Road	Brazil	
Ir. Wiyoto Wiyono Toll Road	13,200	43,300	(Viaduct)		1990	Highway	Indonesia	
Nanjing Xianxin Yangtze River Bridge	13,170	43,210	1,760	5,770	2025	Highway	China	
Great Seto Bridge	13,100	43,000	1,100	3,600	1988	Highway and rail	Japan	
Taoyuan Airport MRT (2k+900~15k+930 from Airport Terminal 1 station)	13,030	42,750	(Viaduct)		2017	Metro	Taiwan	
Bhumibol Bridge	13,000	43,000	398	1,306	2006	Road	Thailand	
Confederation Bridge	12,900	42,300	220	720 (x43)	1997	Highway	Canada	Longest bridge over ice-covered water.
Nansha Bridge	12,891	42,293	1,688	5,538	2019	Expressway	China	
Jubilee Parkway	12,875	42,241	(Viaduct)		1978	Highway	United States	
Rudong Yangkou Yellow Sea Bridge	12,600	41,300	?		2008	Road	China	
Digha-AIIMS Elevated Tollway	12,500	41,000	34	112 (x380)	2020	Highway	India	
Multan Metrobus elevated section	12,500	41,000	?		2017	Elevated BRT	Pakistan	
Vasco da Gama Bridge	17,185	56,381	420	1,380	1998	Highway	Portugal	
Rosario-Victoria Bridge	12,282	40,295	350	1,150	2003	Road	Argentina	
North South MRT line (Lentor North – Marsiling)	12,200	40,000	(Viaduct)		1996	Metro	Singapore	
Emsland test facility	12,000	39,000	(Viaduct)		1985	Maglev	Germany	
Nanjing Qinhuai River Bridge; Beijing-Shanghai High-Speed Railway	12,000	39,000	?		2010	High-speed rail	China	
Lezíria Bridge	11,902	39,049	133	436	2007	Highway	Portugal	
Third Mainland Bridge	11,800	38,700	(Viaduct)		1991	Road	Nigeria	
Qingshuihe Bridge; Qingzang Railway	11,700	38,400	(Viaduct)		2006	Rail	China	
P. V. Narasimha Rao Expressway	11,600	38,100	(Viaduct)		2009	Highway	India	
NAIA Expressway	11,600	38,100	(Viaduct)		2016	Expressway	Philippines	
Taoyuan Airport MRT (19k+600~31k+100 from Airport Terminal 1 station)	11,500	37,700	(Viaduct)		2017	Metro	Taiwan	
San Mateo–Hayward Bridge	11,270	36,980	230.8	757	1967	Highway	United States	
Nichupté Vehicular Bridge	11,200	36,700	?		2026	Road	Mexico	
Hutong Yangtze River Bridge	11,072	36,325	1,092	3,583	2020	Expressway and rail	China	
Zhenjiang Beijing–Hangzhou Canal Bridge; Beijing-Shanghai High-Speed Railway	11,000	36,000	?		2010	High-speed rail	China	
Seven Mile Bridge	10,887	35,719	(Viaduct)		1982	Highway	United States	
Shashangou Bridge	10,690	35,070	(Viaduct)		2019	Rail	China	
Shandong-Henan Yellow River Bridge	10,282	33,734	?		1985	Rail	China	
Jiaxing-Shaoxing Sea Bridge	10,138	33,261	428	1,404 (x6)	2013	Expressway	China	
G. D. Naidu Elevated Expressway	10,100	33,100	(Viaduct)		2025	Highway	India	
Changtai Yangtze River Bridge	10,030	32,910	1,176	3,858	2025	Expressway (& future rail)	China	
Wuhu Yangtze River Bridge	10,020	32,870	312	1,024	2000	Expressway and rail	China	
Bangalore Elevated Tollway	9,945	32,628	(Viaduct)		2010	Highway	India	
Shanghai Yangtze River Bridge	9,970	32,710	730	2,400	2009	Road (& future rail)	China	
Viadotto Coltano	9,860	32,350	(Viaduct)		1993	Expressway	Italy	
General W.K. Wilson Jr. Bridge	9,786	32,106	244	801	1980	Highway	United States	
Kacchi Dargah–Bidupur Bridge	9,760	32,020	150	490(x65)	2025	Road	India	
Southern viaduct of Western High-Speed Diameter	9,378	30,768	320	1,050	2016	Highway	Russia	
Jeongji Viaduct	9,315	30,561	(Viaduct)		2015	High-speed rail	South Korea	
Norfolk Southern Lake Pontchartrain Bridge	9,300	30,500	(Viaduct)		1884	Rail	United States	
Transjakarta Corridor 13	9,300	30,500	(Viaduct)		2017	Elevated BRT	Indonesia	
Nanjing Dashengguan Yangtze River Bridge	9,273	30,423	336	1,102	2010	High-speed rail and metro	China	
Dhola–Sadiya Bridge	9,150	30,020	50	160 (x183)	2017	Road	India	
Chacahoula Swamp Bridge	9,005	29,544	(Viaduct)		1995	Highway	United States	
Northern viaduct of Western High-Speed Diameter	8,794	28,852	240	790	2016	Highway	Russia	
Cebu-Cordova Link Expressway	8,900	29,200	390	1,280	2022	Highway	Philippines	
Frank Davis "Naturally N'Awlins" Memorial Bridge	8,851	29,039	(Viaduct)		1962; 2011	Highway	United States	
Richmond–San Rafael Bridge	8,851	29,039	326	1,070	1956	Highway	United States	
General Rafael Urdaneta Bridge	8,678	28,471	235	771	1962	Road	Venezuela	
Metro Bus corridor-Rawalpindi Section	8,600	28,200	(Viaduct)		2015	Elevated BRT	Pakistan	
Yimlakut Bridge; Hotan–Ruoqiang railway	8,600	28,200	(Viaduct)		2022	Rail	China	
Virginia Dare Memorial Bridge	8,369	27,457	(Viaduct)		2002	Highway	United States	
Yangpu Bridge	8,354	27,408	602	1,975	1993	Road	China	
Rạch Miễu Bridge	8,331	27,333	270	890	2009	Road	Vietnam	
Bali Mandara Toll Road	8,300	27,200	(Viaduct)		2013	Road	Indonesia	
Lahore Metrobus elevated section	8,300	27,200	(Viaduct)		2013	Elevated BRT	Pakistan	
NLEX Harbor Link (Segment 10)	8,250	27,070	(Viaduct)		2020	Expressway	Philippines	
Xiasha Bridge	8,230	27,000	232	761	1991	Expressway	China	
Sutong Bridge	8,206	26,923	1,088	3,570	2008	Expressway	China	
Mackinac Bridge	8,038	26,371	1,158	3,799	1957	Highway	United States	
LaBranche Wetlands Bridge	7,902	25,925	(Viaduct)		1992	Highway	United States	
Öresund Bridge	7,845	25,738	490	1,610	1999	Highway and rail	Denmark and Sweden	
NLEX Connector	7,700	25,300	(Viaduct)		2023 (partially)	Expressway	Philippines	
Maestri Bridge	7,693	25,240	(Viaduct)		1928	Highway	United States	
Jiujiang Yangtze River Bridge	7,675	25,180	216	709	1992	Highway and rail	China	
Gwangan Bridge	7,420	24,340	500	1,600	2002	Highway	South Korea	
Fichera Viaduct	7,350	24,110	(Viaduct)		1975	Expressway	Italy	
Jamal Abdul Nasser Bridge	7,333	24,058	(Viaduct)		2016	Highway	Kuwait	
Seohae Bridge	7,310	23,980	470	1,540	2000	Highway	South Korea	
Madurai Natham road flyover	7,300	24,000	(Viaduct)		2023	Road	India	
Cheonsa Bridge	7,224	23,701	650	2,130	2019	Road	South Korea	
Tongjiang-Nizhneleninskoye railway bridge	7,194	23,602	145	476	2021	Rail	China and Russia	
Ershilipu Bridge; Lanzhou–Urumqi High-Speed Railway	7,093	23,271	?		2014	High-speed rail	China	
James River Bridge	7,071.4	23,200	126.5	415	1928 (rebuilt 1982)	Highway	United States	
Huey P. Long Bridge	7,009	22,995	241	791	1936	Rail	United States	
Gardiner Expressway	6,800	22,300	(Viaduct)		1966	Highway	Canada	
Dalian Xinghai Bay Bridge	6,800	22,300	460	1,510	2015	Highway	China	
Great Belt Bridge (Eastern)	6,790	22,280	1,624	5,328	1998	Highway	Denmark	
Nanjing Yangtze River Bridge	6,772	22,218	160	520	1968	Highway and rail	China	
Xiangshan Harbor Bridge	6,761	22,182	688	2,257	2012	Highway	China	
Sunshine Skyway Bridge	6,700	22,000	366	1,201	1987	Highway	United States	
Dibang River Bridge	6,630	21,750	(Viaduct)		2018	Road	India	
Great Belt Bridge (Western)	6,611	21,690	110	360	1998	Highway and rail	Denmark	
Longmen Bridge	6,597	21,644	1,098	3,602	2024	Expressway	China	
Thanlwin Bridge (Mawlamyaing)	6,589	21,617	112	367 (x21)	2006	Road and rail	Myanmar	
St. George Island Bridge	6,566	21,542	78	256 (x3)	2004	Road	United States	
Astoria–Megler Bridge	6,545	21,473	375	1,230	1966	Highway	United States	
Chesapeake Bay Bridge (eastbound)	6,484	21,273	488	1,601	1952	Highway	United States	
Saale-Elster Viaduct; Erfurt–Leipzig/Halle high-speed railway	6,465	21,211	110	360	2013	High-speed rail	Germany	
Chesapeake Bay Bridge (westbound)	6,415	21,047	488	1,601	1973	Highway	United States	
Wufengshan Yangtze River Bridge	6,409	21,027	1,092	3,583	2020	Expressway and rail	China	
Pakokku Bridge	6,278	20,597	120	390 (x22)	2011	Road and rail	Myanmar	
Ayeyarwady-Nyaungdon Bridge	6,262	20,545	120	390 (x16)	2011	Road and rail	Myanmar	
The Padma Multipurpose Bridge	6,150	20,180	150	490 (x41)	2022	Road and rail	Bangladesh	
Öland Bridge	6,072	19,921	130	430	1972	Highway	Sweden	
Bleiswijk Railway Viaduct	6,000	20,000	(Viaduct)		2006	High-speed rail	Netherlands	
Hernando de Soto Bridge	5,954	19,534	274	899	1973	Highway	United States	
President Bridge	5,825	19,111	220	720 (x22)	2009	Highway	Russia	
Mid-Bay Bridge	5,793	19,006	68	223	1993	Road	United States	
Mahatma Gandhi Setu	5,750	18,860	121	397 (x45)	1982	Road	India	
Lepence Bridge	5,750	18,860	(Viaduct)		2019	Highway	Kosovo	
Pulaski Skyway	5,636	18,491	168	551	1932	Highway	United States	
Garden City Skyway	5,633	18,481	(Viaduct)		1963	Highway	Canada	
Albemarle Sound Bridge	5,627	18,461	?		1990	Road	United States	
Garcon Point Bridge	5,616	18,425	(Viaduct)		1999	Road	United States	
Bromford Viaduct	5,600	18,400	(Viaduct)		1971	Road	United Kingdom	
Bandra-Worli Sea Link	5,575	18,291	250	820 (x2)	2009	Road	India	
Hong Kong–Shenzhen Western Corridor	5,545	18,192	(Viaduct)		2006	Expressway	Hong Kong	
Island Eastern Corridor (Causeway Bay to Quarry Bay section)	5,500	18,000	(Viaduct)		1983	Road	Hong Kong	
Tan Vu-Lach Huyen Bridge	5,440	17,850	150	490 (x2)	2017	Highway	Vietnam	
Morello Viaduct	5,440	17,850	(Viaduct)		1970	Expressway	Italy	
Suramadu Bridge	5,438	17,841	434	1,424	2009	Road	Indonesia	
Dauphin Island Bridge	5,430	17,810	122	400	1982	Road	United States	
Littoral viaduct	5,409	17,746	120	390	2022	Road	Réunion	
Xinkai River Bridge of Beijing-Tianjin Intercity Railway	5,371	17,621	?		2007	High-speed rail	China	
Libertador General San Martín Bridge	5,366	17,605	220	720	1976	Road	Uruguay and Argentina	
Hanjiang Bridge of Haoji Railway	5,242	17,198	?		2019	Rail	China	
Yolo Causeway	5,200	17,100	(Viaduct)		1916; 1962	Highway	United States	
King Fahd Causeway Bridge I	5,194	17,041	150	490	1986	Road	Saudi Arabia and Bahrain	
Hell Gate Bridge	5,182	17,001	310	1,020	1917	Rail	United States	
Rupsha Rail Bridge	5,130	16,830	102	335 (x7)	2023	Rail	Bangladesh	
Second Severn Crossing	5,128	16,824	456	1,496	1996	Road	United Kingdom	
Zeeland Bridge	5,022	16,476	95	312 (x48)	1965	Road	Netherlands	
Kinmen Bridge	5,000	16,000	200	660 (x4)	2022	Road	Taiwan	
Bolte Bridge	5,000	16,000	173	568 (x2)	1999	Freeway	Australia	
Candaba Viaduct	5,000	16,000	(Viaduct)		1977	Highway	Philippines	
New Tappan Zee Bridge	4,989	16,368	370	1,210	2017	Highway	United States	
Jamuna Bridge	4,980	16,340	99	325 (x49)	1998	Road and rail	Bangladesh	
Buckman Bridge	4,968	16,299	76.2	250	1970	Highway	United States	
Bogibeel Bridge	4,940	16,210	125	410 (x39)	2018	Road and rail	India	
Hongjecheon Bridge	4,937	16,198	(Viaduct)		1996	Highway	South Korea	
Pensacola Bay Bridge	4,920	16,140	115	377	1931 (rebuilt 1960) (rebuilt 2021)	Highway	United States	
Howard Frankland Bridge (Southbound)	4,846	15,899	(Viaduct)		1990	Highway	United States	
Howard Frankland Bridge (Northbound)	4,838	15,873	(Viaduct)		1960	Highway	United States	
North–South Motorway	4,800	15,700	(Viaduct)		2014	Expressway	Australia	
Jamuna Railway Bridge	4,800	15,700	(Viaduct)		2025	Rail	Bangladesh	
Gran Manglar Viaduct	4,730	15,520	(Viaduct)		2018	Road	Colombia	
Ogooué Bridge	4,707	15,443	120	390	2019	Road	Gabon	
Moscow Monorail Viaduct	4,700	15,400	(Viaduct)		2004	Metro	Russia	closed, is under the conversion to the park
Tar Bridge on Washington Bypass	4,700	15,400	(Viaduct)		2010	Highway	United States	
Dingziwan Cross-Sea Bridge	4,700	15,400	376	1,234	2012	Highway	China	
Third Incheon Bridge	4,680	15,350	560	1,840	2026	Highway	South Korea	
Vembanad Rail Bridge	4,620	15,160	40	130 (x99)	2011	Rail	India	
Çanakkale 1915 Bridge	4,608	15,118	2,023	6,637	2022	Highway	Turkey	
Nkomi Laguna Bridge	4,577	15,016	120	390	2019	Road	Gabon	
Digha–Sonpur Bridge	4,556	14,948	123	404 (x36)	2016	Road and rail	India	
Wright Memorial Bridge (Westbound)	4,550	14,930	(Viaduct)		1930 (rebuilt 1995)	Road	United States	
Lindsay C. Warren Bridge	4,550	14,930	?		1960	Highway	United States	
Wright Memorial Bridge (Eastbound)	4,531.7	14,868	(Viaduct)		1966 (rebuilt 1997)	Road	United States	
Gandy Bridge (Eastbound)	4,529	14,859	(Viaduct)		1924 (rebuilt 1975)	Highway	United States	
Marc Basnight Bridge	4,506	14,783	(Viaduct)		2019	Road	United States	
Sault Ste. Marie International Bridge	4,480	14,700	132	433	1962	Highway	United States and Canada	
Podilsko-Voskresensky Bridge	4,432.2	14,541	344	1,129	2023 (partially)	Road (& future metro)	Ukraine	
Yeongjong Bridge	4,420	14,500	300	980	2000	Highway and rail	South Korea	
Sydney Metro Northwest Skytrain	4,413	14,478	270	890	2019	Metro	Australia	
Vikramshila Setu	4,400	14,400	142	466	2001	Road	India	
Jingzhou Yangtze River Bridge	4,398	14,429	500	1,600	2002	Expressway	China	
Aqua Bridge (Tokyo Bay Aqua-Line)	4,384	14,383	240	790	1997	Road	Japan	
Viadukt Kriváň-Mýtna	4,374	14,350	(Viaduct)		2025	Highway	Slovakia	
Amur Bay Bridge	4,364	14,318	(Viaduct)		2012	Highway	Russia	
Arrah–Chhapra Bridge	4,350	14,270	120	390 (x16)	2017	Road	India	
William B. Umstead Bridge	4,348	14,265	(Viaduct)		1955	Road	United States	
Horace Wilkinson Bridge	4,313	14,150	376	1,234	1968	Highway	United States	
Ponte Salgueiro Maia	4,308	14,134	246	807	2000	Highway	Portugal	
Bayside Bridge	4,270	14,010	(Viaduct)		1993	Highway	United States	
Hochstraße Elbmarsch	4,258	13,970	(Viaduct)		1974	Highway	Germany	
Bubiyan Island Railway Bridge	4,245	13,927	(Viaduct)		2011	Rail	Kuwait	
Commodore Barry Bridge	4,240	13,910	501	1,644	1974	Highway	United States	
Gandy Bridge (Westbound)	4,232	13,885	(Viaduct)		1956 (rebuilt 1996)	Highway	United States	
Viadotto Cannatello	4,220	13,850	(Viaduct)		1975	Expressway	Italy	
Robert F. Kennedy Bridge	4,212	13,819	420	1,380	1936	Expressway	United States	
Escambia Bay Bridge	4,210	13,810	75	246	1968 (rebuilt 2007)	Highway	United States	
Fred Hartman Bridge	4,185	13,730	381	1,250	1995	Highway	United States	
Verrazzano–Narrows Bridge	4,176	13,701	1,298	4,259	1964	Highway	United States	
Greenville Bridge	4,133	13,560	420	1,380	2007	Highway	United States	
Godavari Fourth Bridge	4,135	13,566	50	160 (x82)	2015	Road	India	
Yangsigang Yangtze River Bridge	4,130	13,550	1,700	5,600	2019	Highway	China	
Godavari Road-Cum-Rail Bridge	4,100	13,500	91.5	300 (x27)	1974	Road and rail	India	
Crescent City Connection	4,093	13,428	480	1,570	1958	Highway	United States	
Anghel Saligny Bridge	4,088	13,412	190	620	1895	Rail	Romania	In the 1960s, the original viaduct over Balta Ialomiței island was replaced with an embankment, that's why this bridge is now only 2,632 metres (8,635 ft) long
Arthur Ravenel, Jr. Bridge	4,023	13,199	471	1,545	2005	Highway	United States	
Kurushima-Kaikyō Bridge	4,015	13,173	1,030	3,380	1999	Highway	Japan	
Hưng Đức Bridge	4,015	13,173	120	390 (x3)	2024	Expressway	Vietnam	
John Gorrie Memorial Bridge	4,000	13,000	(Viaduct)		1935 (rebuilt 1988)	Road	United States	
Judge Clyde B. Wells Bridge (Northbound)	4,000	13,000	61	200	2017	Highway	United States	
Vicksburg Bridge	3,954	12,972	265	869	1973	Highway	United States	
Köhlbrandbrücke	3,940	12,930	520	1,710	1974	Road	Germany	
John James Audubon Bridge	3,927	12,884	482	1,581	2011	Highway	United States	
Akashi Kaikyō Bridge	3,911	12,831	1,991	6,532	1998	Highway	Japan	
Amizade Bridge	3,900	12,800	180	590	1994	Road	Macau	
Suez Canal Bridge	3,900	12,800	440	1,440	2001	Road	Egypt	
Lupu Bridge	3,900	12,800	550	1,800	2003	Road	China	
Rodanthe Bridge	3,900	12,800	(Viaduct)		2022	Road	United States	
Yuribey Bridge	3,892.9	12,772	110	360	2009	Rail	Russia	
Khabarovsk Bridge	3,890.5	12,764	127.4	418 (x18)	1999	Road	Russia	Road section with approaching overpasses. Rail section built in 1916 is shorter than 3 km
The First Kitakami River Bridge; Tōhoku Shinkansen	3,868	12,690	?		1982	High-speed rail	Japan	
Zacatal Bridge	3,861	12,667	(Viaduct)		1994	Road	Mexico	
Ponte della Libertà	3,850	12,630	?		1846; 1933	Road and rail	Italy	
Queen Isabella Causeway	3,810	12,500	95	312	1974	Road	United States	
Santhià Viaduct	3,782	12,408	(Viaduct)		2006	Rail	Italy	
Panguil Bay Bridge	3,770	12,370	150	490	2024	Road	Philippines	
Sky Gate Bridge R	3,750	12,300	150	490	1994	Road and rail	Japan	
Munger Ganga Bridge	3,750	12,300	124	407 (x29)	2016	Road and rail	India	
CNR Bonnet Carré Spillway-McComb Bridge	3,702	12,146	(Viaduct)		1935	Rail	United States	
Rollemberg–Vuolo Road–Railway Bridge	3,700	12,100	100	330 (x26)	1998	Road and rail	Brazil	
Nhật Tân Bridge	3,700	12,100	300	980 (x4)	2015	Highway	Vietnam	
Vinh Tuy Bridge	3,690	12,110	135	443	2008	Road	Vietnam	
Dona Ana Bridge	3,670	12,040	80	260 (x33)	1934	Rail	(Mozambique) Mozambique	
Walt Whitman Bridge	3,652	11,982	610	2,000	1957	Highway	United States	
Humen Pearl River Bridge	3,618	11,870	888	2,913	1997	Expressway	China	
Ayrton Senna Bridge	3,607	11,834	52	171 (x2)	1998	Road	Brazil	
Richard I. Bong Memorial Bridge	3,600	11,800	152	499	1984	Highway	United States	
Panipat Elevated Expressway	3,600	11,800	(Viaduct)		2008	Expressway	India	
Rio Negro Bridge	3,595	11,795	200	660 (x2)	2011	Road	Brazil	
Fadalto Viaduct (Southbound)	3,567	11,703	(Viaduct)		1995	Highway	Italy	
San Francisco–Oakland Bay Bridge (eastern span)	3,540	11,610	385	1,263	2013	Highway	United States	
Irabu Bridge R	3,540	11,610	180	590	2015	Road	Japan	
Thang Long Bridge	3,500	11,500	?		1978	Highway and rail	Vietnam	
Fadalto Viaduct (Northbound)	3,485	11,434	(Viaduct)		1995	Highway	Italy	
Samuel De-Champlain Bridge	3,480	11,420	240	790	2019	Highway and light rail	Canada	
El Hachef Viaduct	3,466	11,371	(Viaduct)		2018	High-speed rail	Morocco	
Throgs Neck Bridge	3,430	11,250	549	1,801	1961	Highway	United States	
Claiborne Pell Newport Bridge	3,428	11,247	490	1,610	1969	Highway	United States	
Jacques Cartier Bridge	3,425.6	11,239	334	1,096	1930	Highway	Canada	
San Diego–Coronado Bridge	3,407	11,178	200	660 (x2)	1969	Highway	United States	
Mozambique Island Bridge	3,390	11,120	(Viaduct)		1969	Road	(Mozambique) Mozambique	
Colne Valley Viaduct	3,380	11,090	(Viaduct)		2025	High speed rail	United Kingdom	
Lake Jesup Bridge	3,379	11,086	?		1993	Highway	United States	
Viadotto Imera II	3,370	11,060	(Viaduct)		1975 (rebuilt 2020)	Expressway	Italy	
Busan Harbor Bridge	3,368	11,050	540	1,770	2014	Highway	South Korea	
M12 Volga Bridge	3,362	11,030	156	512	2023	Highway	Russia	
Saint-Nazaire Bridge	3,356	11,010	404	1,325	1974	Road	France	
King Fahd Causeway Bridge II	3,334	10,938	(Viaduct)		1986	Road	Saudi Arabia and Bahrain	
Third Bridge	3,300	10,800	260	850	1989	Road	Brazil	
Harbor Bridge Project	3,298	10,820	506.4	1,661	2025	Highway	United States	
Delaware Memorial Bridge (Westbound)	3,291	10,797	655	2,149	1968	Highway	United States	
Delaware Memorial Bridge (Eastbound)	3,281	10,764	655	2,149	1951	Highway	United States	
La Unidad Bridge	3,277	10,751	(Viaduct)		1982 (rebuilt 2019)	Road	Mexico	
Tay Bridge	3,264	10,709	75	246 (x13)	1887	Rail	United Kingdom	
Hale Boggs Memorial Bridge	3,261	10,699	376	1,234	1983	Highway	United States	
Chahlari Ghat Bridge	3,260	10,700	?		2017	Road	India	
Dames Point Bridge	3,245	10,646	396	1,299	1989	Highway	United States	
Pumarejo bridge	3,237	10,620	380	1,250	2019	Highway	Colombia	
Great South Bay Bridge	3,206.3	10,519	180	590	1954 (SB); 1968 (NB)	Highway	United States	
Nurly Zhol Bridge R	3,200	10,500	252	827	2016	Road	Kazakhstan	
Macleay Valley Bridge	3,200	10,500	34	112 (x94)	2013	Freeway	Australia	
Sam Houston Ship Channel Bridge	3,200	10,500	230	750	1982	Highway	United States	
Storstrøm Bridge	3,199	10,495	136	446	1937	Road and rail	Denmark	
Third Mandovi Bridge	3,190	10,470	150	490 (x3)	2019	Highway	India	
25 de Abril Bridge	3,173	10,410	1,013	3,323	1966	Road and rail	Portugal	
Orinoquia Bridge	3,156	10,354	300	980	2006	Road and rail	Venezuela	
San Francisco–Oakland Bay Bridge (western span)	3,141	10,305	704	2,310 (x2)	1936	Highway	United States	
Bridge to Russky Island	3,100	10,200	1,104	3,622	2012	Highway	Russia	
La Pepa Bridge	3,092	10,144	540	1,770	2015	Road	Spain	
Thanh Tri Bridge	3,084	10,118	130	430 (x4)	2008	Expressway	Vietnam	
Heishipu Bridge	3,068	10,066	162	531	2004	Expressway	China	
Jawahar Setu	3,061	10,043	?		1965	Road	India	
Talmadge Memorial Bridge	3,060	10,040	335	1,099	1991	Highway	United States	
Mokpo Bridge	3,060	10,040	500	1,600	2012	Road	South Korea	
Nehru Setu	3,059	10,036	32.5	107 (x93)	1900	Rail	India	
Bạch Đằng Bridge	3,054	10,020	240	790 (x2)	2018	Expressway	Vietnam	
Maputo–Katembe bridge	3,041	9,977	680	2,230	2018	Road	(Mozambique) Mozambique	
Kolia Bhomora Setu (Northbound)	3,040	9,970	120	390 (x24)	2021	Road	India	
Oleron Viaduct	3,027	9,931	80	260 (x4)	1966	Road	France	
Kolia Bhomora Setu (Southbound)	3,015	9,892	120	390 (x24)	1987	Road	India	
Murrumbeena Skyrail Pakenham line	3,012	9,882	40	130 (x24)	2018	Metro	Australia	
Ponte Conde de Linhares	3,000	9,800	?		1634	Road	India	
Jiangyin Bridge	3,000	9,800	1,385	4,544	1999	Expressway	China	
Korthi-Kolhar Bridge	3,000	9,800	?		2006	Road	India	
C310 Viaduct	3,000	9,800	(Viaduct)		2007	High-speed rail	China	
Daudnagar Bridge	3,000	9,800	?		2019	Road	India	

== Under construction ==
Name	Length		Main span		Planned completion	Traffic	Country
Name	m	ft	m	ft	Planned completion	Traffic	Country
Mumbai–Ahmedabad high-speed rail corridor	353,100	1,158,500	(Viaduct)		2029	High-speed rail	India
Lion Ocean Link	35,089	115,121	2,180	7,150	2028	Expressway	China
Southeast Metro Manila Expressway	32,664	107,165	(Viaduct)		unknown (on hold)	Expressway	Philippines
Bataan–Cavite Interlink Bridge	32,150	105,480	900	3,000	2029	Road	Philippines
Kolkata Metro Orange Line	29,870	98,000	(Viaduct)		2026	Metro	India
Hangzhou Bay Railway Bridge; Nantong–Suzhou–Jiaxing–Ningbo high-speed railway	29,200	95,800	450	1,480 (x3)	2027	High-speed rail	China
Astana Light Metro	21,500	70,500	(Viaduct)		2026	Metro	Kazakhstan
Aroor–Thuravoor Elevated Highway	12,750	41,830	(Viaduct)		2028	Highway	India
Dhubri-Phulbari bridge	12,625	41,421	(Viaduct)		2028	Road	India
Phước Khánh Bridge+Bình Khánh Bridge; Ben Luc – Long Thanh Expressway	12,500	41,000	375	1,230	2026	Expressway	Vietnam
MRT Line 1 (Dhaka Metro)	11,360	37,270	(Viaduct)		2030	Metro	Bangladesh
Third Orinoco Crossing	11,100	36,400	360	1,180	unknown (on hold)	Road and rail	Venezuela
Versova–Bandra Sea Link	9,600	31,500	300	980	2027	Expressway	India
MRT Line 5 (Northern Route)	6,500	21,300	(Viaduct)		2028	Metro	Bangladesh
Sahibganj–Manihari Bridge	6,250	20,510	?		2027	Road	India
Gashuunsukhait-Gantsmod Railway Bridge	5,758	18,891	(Viaduct)		2027	Railway Bridge	Mongolia
Bakhtiyarpur–Tajpur Bridge	5,575	18,291	125	410 (x43)	2026	Road	India
Nansha Wanlong Bridge	5,146	16,883	608	1,995	2026	Highway	China
Lena Bridge	4,610	15,120	840	2,760 (x2)	2028	Road	Russia
Davao–Samal Bridge	3,980	13,060	275	902	2027	Road	Philippines
Phaphamau–Prayagraj Bridge	3,840	12,600	200	660 (x3)	2026	Highway	India
Queen Margrethe II's Bridge	3,832	12,572	160	520 (x2)	2026	Road and high-speed rail	Denmark
Thilamalé Bridge	3,630	11,910	(Viaduct)		2027	Road	Maldives
Sam Houston Ship Channel Bridge Replacement	3,500	11,500	402.4	1,320	2027 (SB); 2030 (NB)	Highway	United States
Persian Gulf Bridge	3,400	11,200	(Viaduct)		?	Road and rail	Iran
Francis Scott Key Bridge replacement	3,357	11,014	507.5	1,665	2030	Highway	United States
Sultanganj-Aguani Ghat bridge	3,160	10,370	270	890	unknown (on hold)	Road	India
Rathoa Haryam Bridge	3,055	10,023	160	520	2027	Road	Pakistan

== See also ==
- List of spans
- List of longest arch bridge spans
- List of longest masonry arch bridge spans
- List of longest cantilever bridge spans
- List of longest cable-stayed bridge spans
- List of longest continuous truss bridge spans
- List of longest suspension bridge spans
- List of longest tunnels
- List of bridges
