= Jingzhou railway station =

Jingzhou railway station may refer to:

- Jingzhou railway station (Hebei) (景州站)
- Jingzhou railway station (Hubei) (荆州站)
- Jingzhou railway station (Hunan) (靖州站)
