= Cangzhou West railway station =

Railway station in Cangzhou, China

Cangzhou West 沧州西
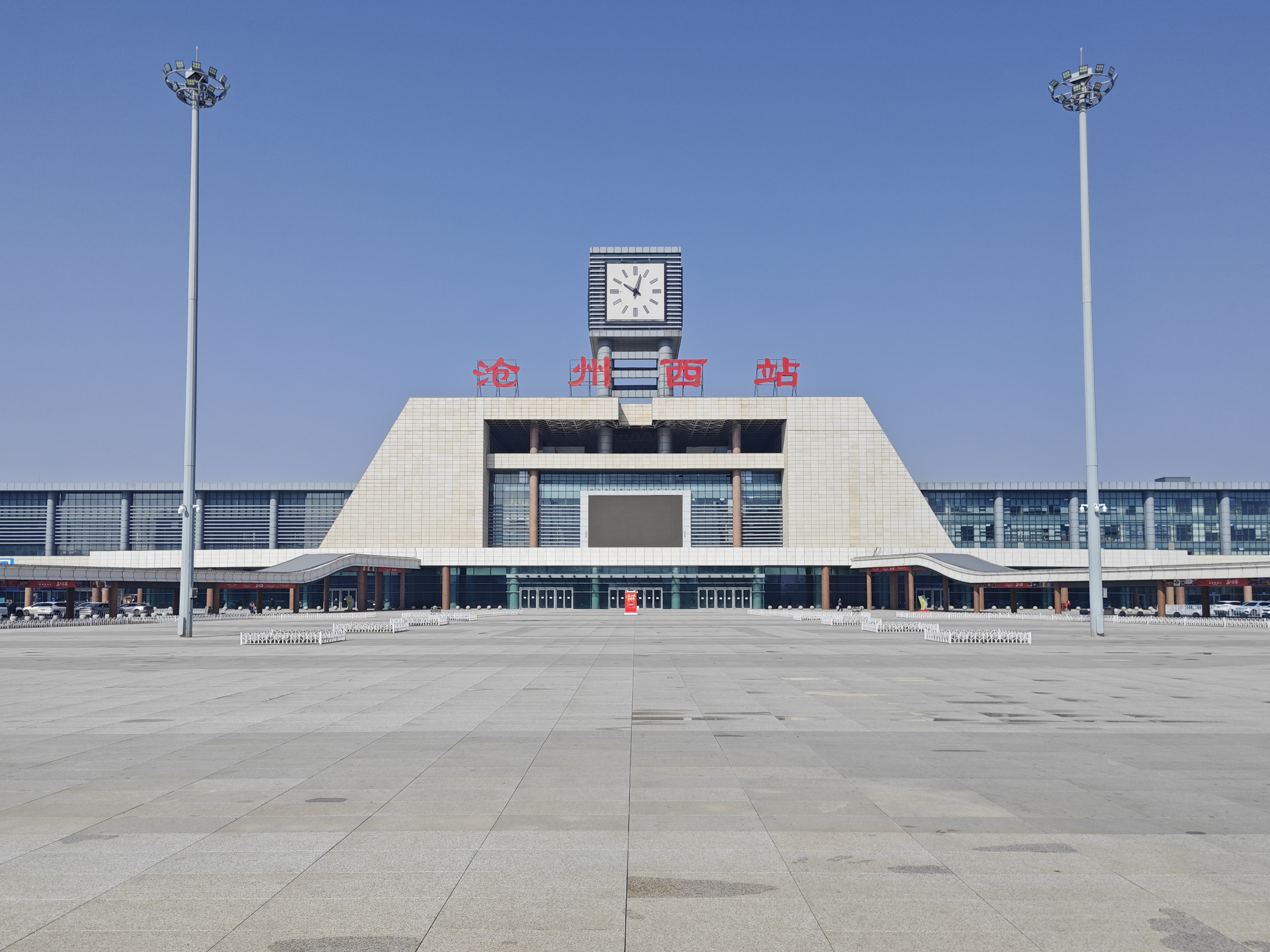
- Station Building

General information
- Other names: Cangzhou West
- Location: Yunhe District, Cangzhou, Hebei; China
- Coordinates: 38.306313°N 116.761247°E
- Operated by: Beijing Railway Bureau; China Railway Corporation
- Line: Beijing–Shanghai high-speed railway
- Platforms: 2

Other information
- Station code: TMIS code: 66806; Telegraph code: CBP; Pinyin code: CZX

History
- Opened: June 30, 2011
Location

Cangzhou West railway station (simplified Chinese: 沧州西站; traditional Chinese: 滄州西站; pinyin: Cāngzhōuxī Zhàn) is a high-speed railway station in Cangzhou, Hebei. It is served by some trains on the Beijing–Shanghai high-speed railway.

Cangzhou West railway station is a station under the jurisdiction of China Railway Beijing Group. It is one of the intermediate stations on the Beijing-Shanghai High-Speed Railway.

== Station information ==
As of September 2017, Cangzhou West Station covers an area of nearly 160,000 square meters, with a building area of 120,000 square meters.

The station features 2 platforms and 6 lines, with a maximum capacity of 1,200 people. The construction of the main building and the square in front of the station started in September 2010.

Cangzhou West Station was officially put into operation on June 30, 2011.

Cangzhou West Station is also set to become a station for the Shijiazhuang-Hengshui-Cangzhou-Huanghua Port Intercity Railway and construction is currently underway.

Preceding station	China Railway High-speed	Following station
Tianjin South towards Beijing South or Tianjin West	Beijing–Shanghai high-speed railway Part of the Beijing–Taipei High-Speed Rail Corridor	Dezhou East towards Shanghai Hongqiao
