= Pingyuan East railway station =

Railway station in Wangfenglou, Shandong, China

Coordinates: 37.2173°N 116.5763°E

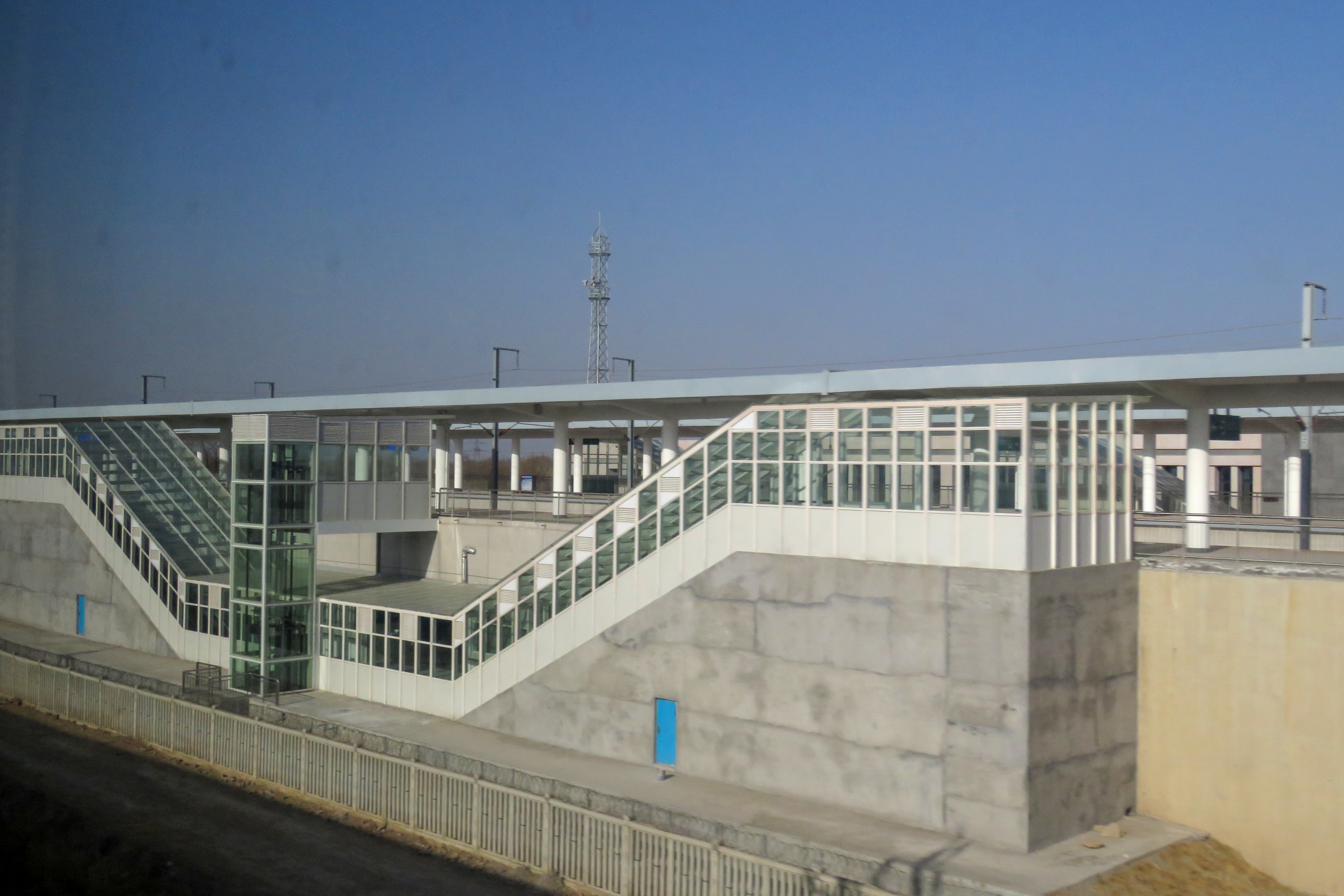

General information
- Location: Wangfenglou, Pingyuan County, Dezhou, Shandong, China
- Transit authority: China Railway Jinan Group
- Line: Shijiazhuang–Jinan high-speed railway
- Platforms: 2
- Tracks: 4
Location

Pingyuan East railway station is a station in Wangfenglou, Pingyuan County, Shandong, China. It is managed by the China Railway Jinan Group.

== Station information ==
The station sits on the Shijiazhuang-Jinan High-Speed Railway and is located approximately 16 km west of the center of Pingyuan County. The station was opened in 2017.

The station building consists of 2 platforms and 4 tracks, with an effective length of 650 meters for the arrival and departure tracks.

There are one side platform and one basic platform, along with one newly constructed passenger tunnel. The total building area is 3,088 square meters, divided into one underground level and two floors above.

WIth the completion of the high speed railway, the travel time from Pingyuan to major cities like Shijiazhuang and Jinan is about one hour.

Preceding station	China Railway High-speed	Following station
Dezhou East towards Shijiazhuang	Shijiazhuang–Jinan high-speed railway	Yucheng East towards Jinan East
