= Chahlari Ghat Bridge =

Chahlari Ghat Bridge (Bahraich - Sitapur)
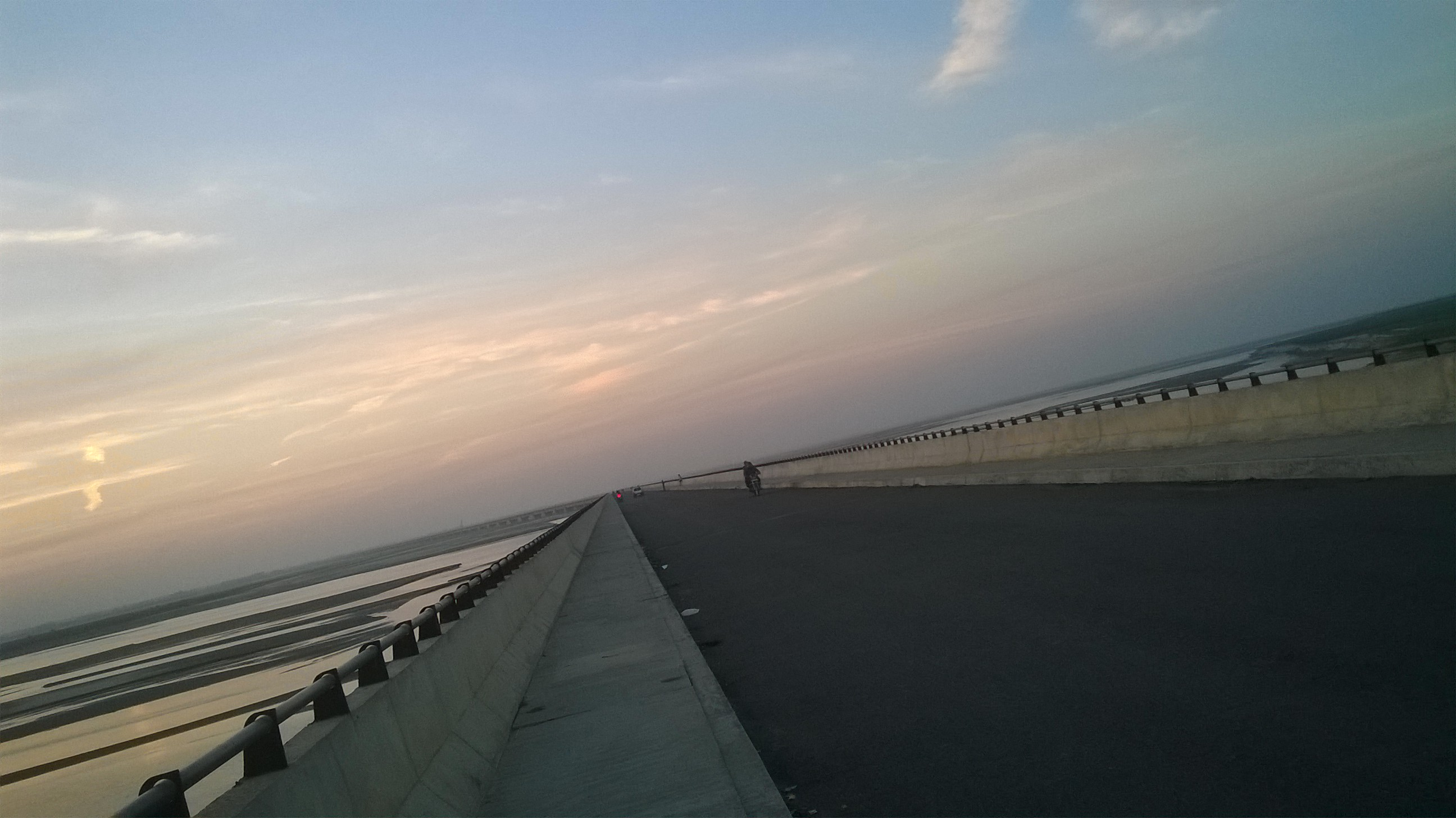
- A View of Chahlari Ghat Setu
- Coordinates: 27°33′11″N 81°19′49″E
- Carries: 2 lanes of roadway and pedestrian pathways each side
- Crosses: Ghaghra River
- Locale: Bahraich - Sitapur
- Official name: Chahlari Ghat Bridge
- Maintained by: U.P. State Bridge Corporation Ltd.

Characteristics
- Material: Concrete and steel
- Total length: 3.26 km (2.03 mi)
- Width: 10 m (33 ft)
- Clearance below: 265

History
- Construction start: 2006
- Construction end: 2017
- Opened: Feb 2017

Statistics
- Toll: No (revoked)

Location
- Interactive map of Chahlari Ghat Bridge (Bahraich - Sitapur)

Chahlari Ghat Bridge (also called Chahlari Ghat Setu चहलारी घाट in Hindi) is a bridge over the Ghaghara River, connecting Bahraich in the east to Sitapur in the west of Uttar Pradesh. Its length is 3,260 metres (10,700 ft). and it is the 13th longest river bridge in India and longest road bridge over river in Uttar Pradesh.

It is result of the efforts of Prominent socialist leader Mukhtar Anis who known as "Ganjer Ke Gandhi".

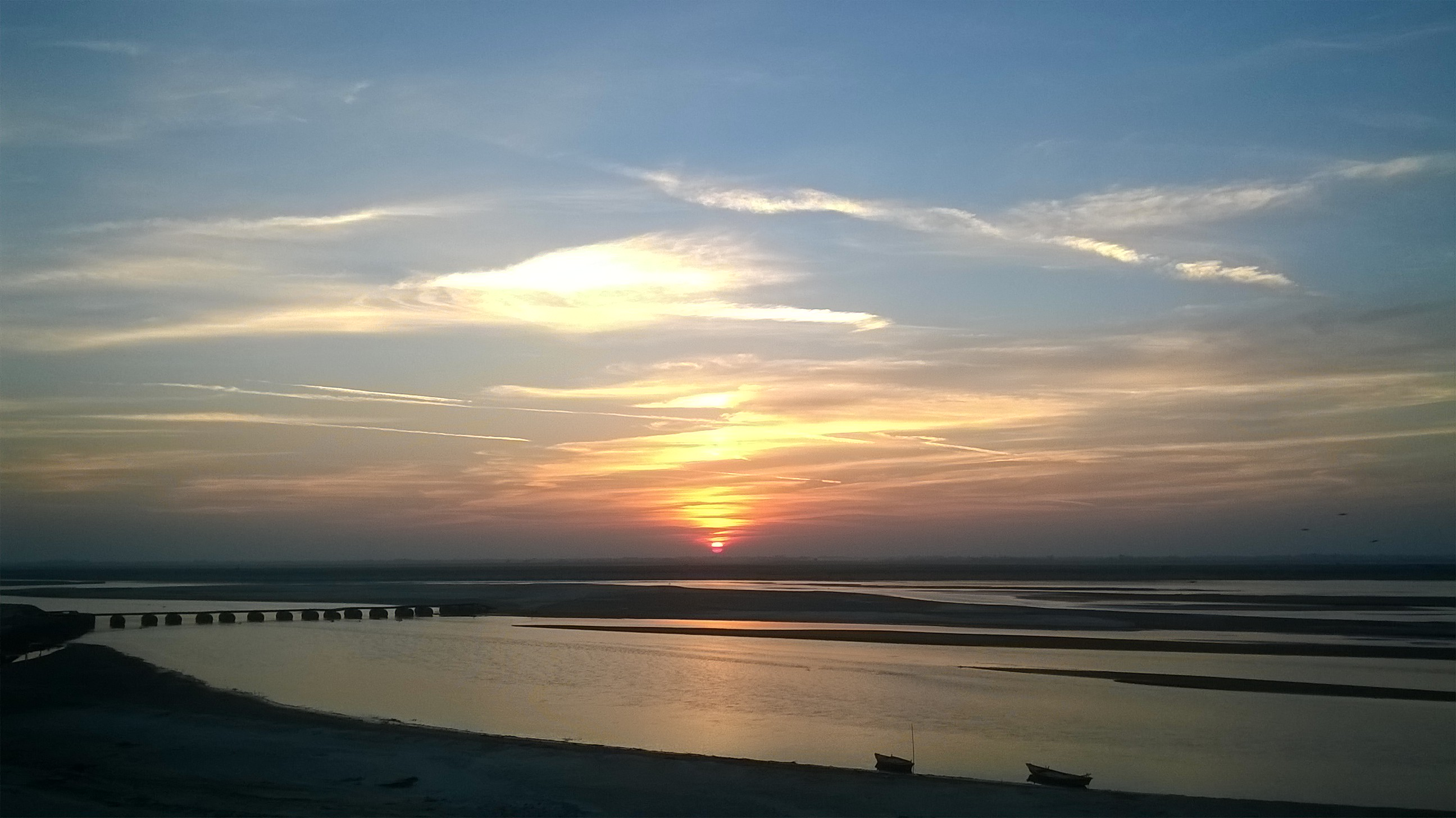
Ghaghara River Bahraich

== See also ==
- List of longest bridges in the world
- List of longest bridges above water in India
- List of bridges in India
- Kacchi Dargah-Bidupur Bridge
