= Cangde Grand Bridge =

Bridge in People's Republic of China

Coordinates: 37.828°N 116.5659°E

Cangde Grand Bridge (沧德特大桥) is the world's fourth longest bridge. Finished in 2010, the bridge is a part of the Beijing–Shanghai High-Speed Railway and is the third longest bridge on the railway. The bridge has been designed with a view to withstanding earthquakes. The total length of the Cangde super-large bridge is 105.81 km (65.75 mi) and it has a total of 3092 piers.

== See also ==
- List of longest bridges in the world
