= Gaocheng South railway station =

Railway station in Shijiazhuang, China

Gaochengnan 藁城南

General information
- Location: Gaocheng District, Shijiazhuang, Hebei; China
- Coordinates: 37.985289°N 114.849182°E
- Line: Shijiazhuang–Jinan High-Speed Railway

Other information
- Station code: Telegraph code: GUP; Pinyin code: GCN
Location

Gaocheng South railway station (藁城南站) is a railway station of Shiji Passenger Railway that is located in Gaocheng District, Shijiazhuang, Hebei, China. The station started operations on 28 December 2017.

Preceding station	China Railway High-speed	Following station
Shijiazhuang East towards Shijiazhuang	Shijiazhuang–Jinan high-speed railway	Xinji South towards Jinan East
