= Yangcun Bridge =

- Coordinates: 39°36′57″N 116°49′44″E
- Locale: China

Characteristics
- Total length: 35.812 kilometres (22.253 mi)

History
- Construction end: 2007
- Opened: 2008

Location
- Interactive map of Yangcun Bridge

The Yangcun Bridge is a railway bridge located in China. It is 35.812 kilometres (22.253 mi) long, or roughly 117,500 feet, making it one of the 10 longest bridges in China, ranging from the 7th–9th longest according to different sources. The construction of the bridge was completed in 2007.

== See also ==
- List of longest bridges in the world
