= Hengshui North railway station =

Railway station in Hengshui, Hebei

Hengshui North 衡水北
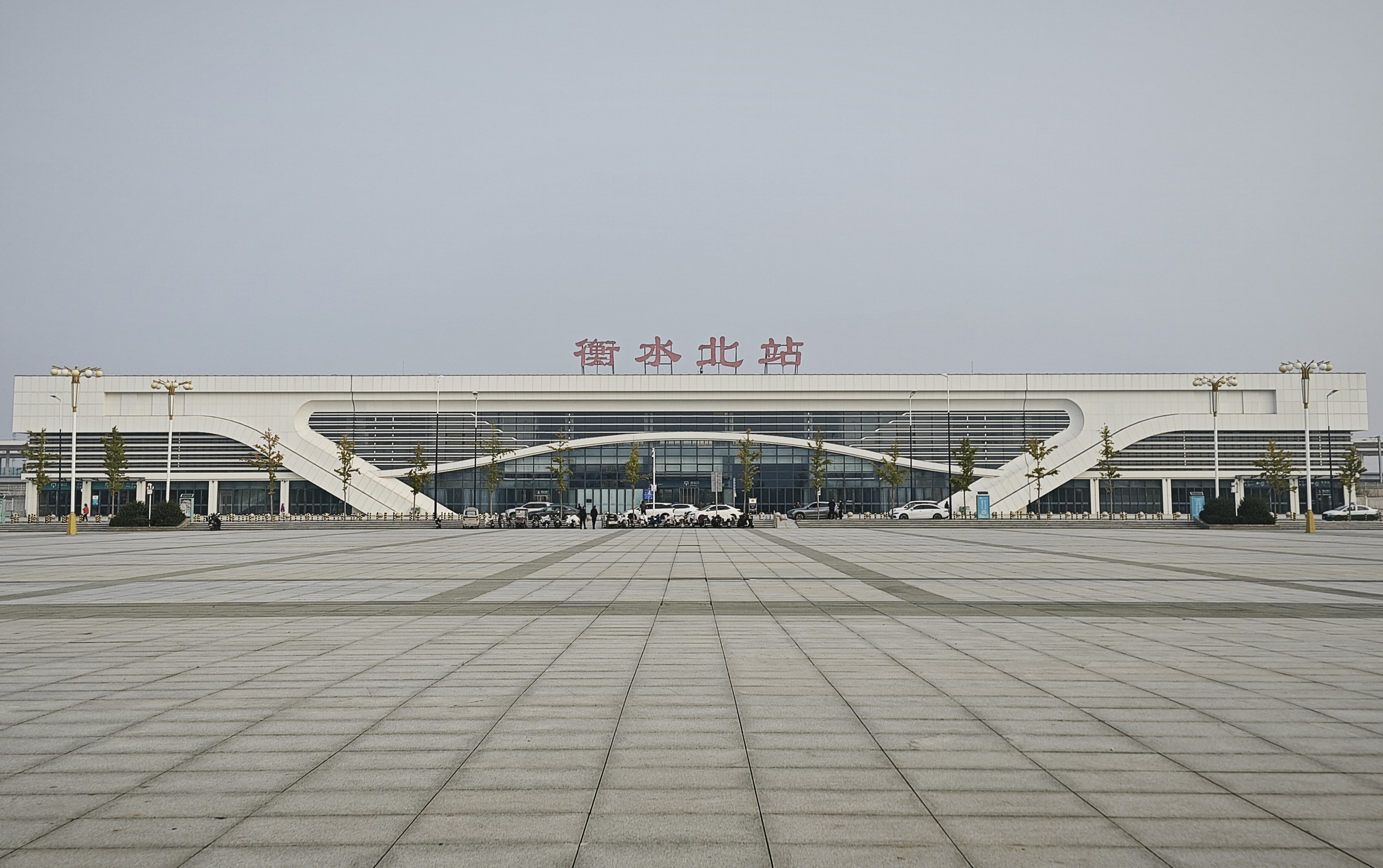
- Hengshuibei Railway Station

General information
- Location: Taocheng District, Hengshui, Hebei; China
- Coordinates: 37°46′21.62″N 115°40′9.14″E
- Line: Shijiazhuang–Jinan passenger railway

History
- Opened: 28 December 2017
Location

Hengshui North railway station (Chinese: 衡水北站) is a railway station in Taocheng District, Hengshui, Hebei, China. It opened with the on 28 December 2017.

Preceding station	China Railway High-speed	Following station
Xinji South towards Shijiazhuang	Shijiazhuang–Jinan high-speed railway	Jingzhou towards Jinan East
