= Beijing Grand Bridge =

Beijing Grand Bridge 北京特大桥
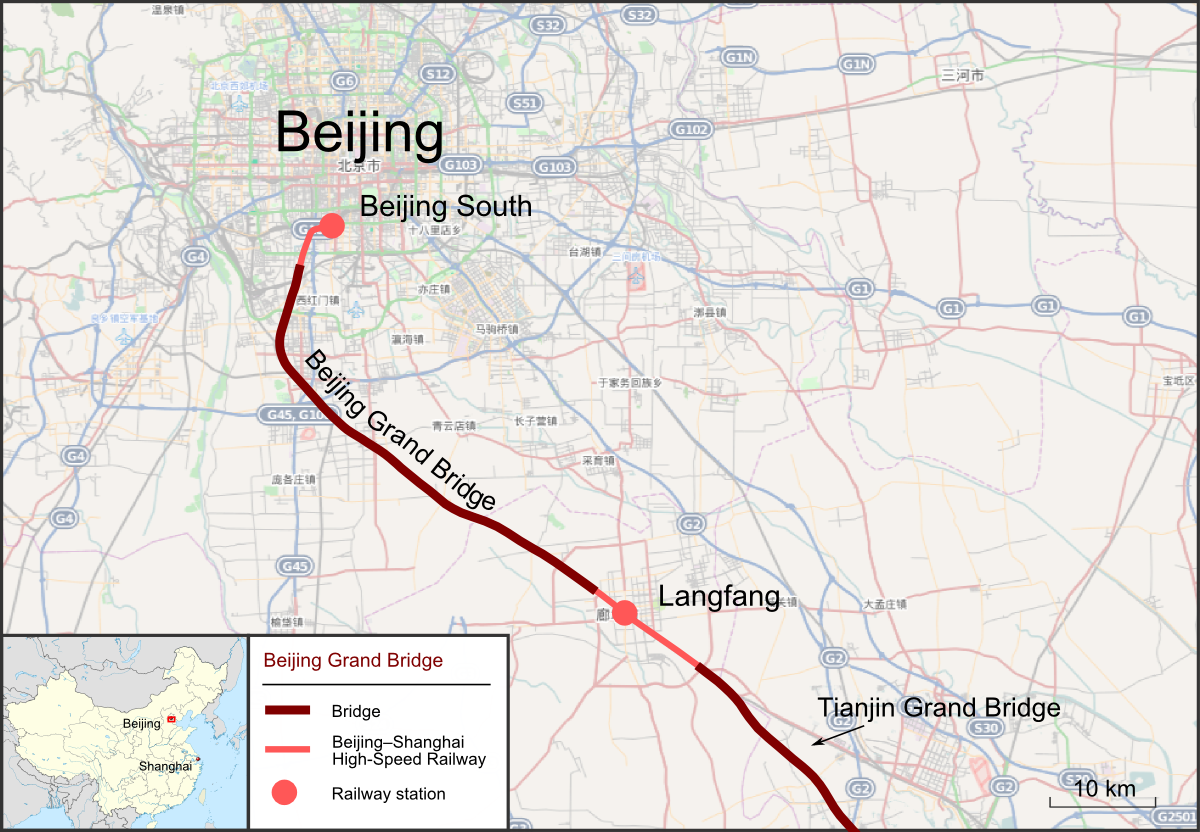
- Coordinates: 39°50′15″N 116°19′53″E
- Carries: Rail
- Locale: Beijing

Characteristics
- Total length: 48.153 km (29.921 mi)
- Longest span: 44 m (144 ft)

History
- Construction end: 2010
- Opened: 2011

Beijing Grand Bridge (Chinese: 北京特大桥) is a 48.15-kilometer (29.92 mi)-long railway viaduct on the Beijing–Shanghai High-Speed Railway, located in Beijing. It is one of the longest bridges in the world.
