= Danyang–Kunshan Grand Bridge =

Viaduct

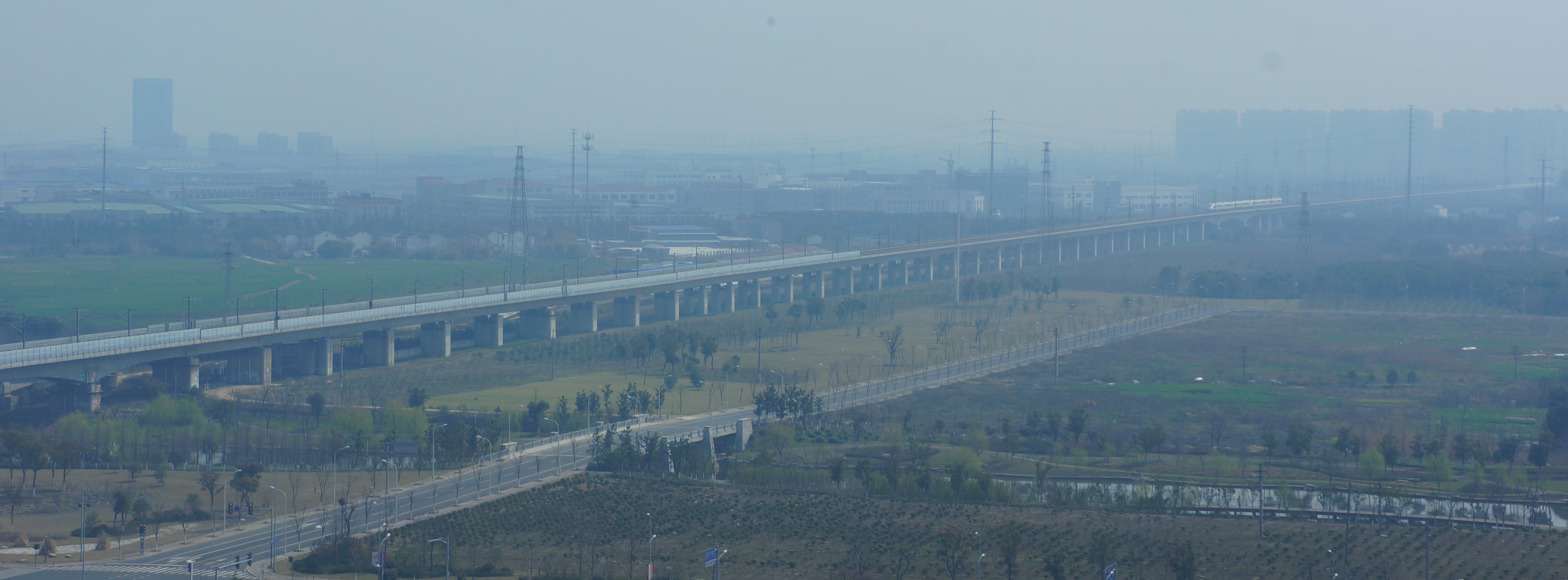
- Danyang-Kunshan bridge
- Coordinates: 31.597837°N 120.456848°E
- Carries: Rail
- Locale: Jiangsu

Characteristics
- Material: RCC (Reinforced Cement Concrete)
- Total length: 164.8 kilometres (102.4 mi)
- Width: 79 metres (260 feet) (avg.)
- Height: 30 metres (100 feet) (avg.)
- No. of spans: 2000

History
- Designer: China Road and Bridge Corporation (CRBC)
- Construction start: c. 2006
- Construction end: 2010
- Construction cost: US$8.5 billion
- Opened: 30 June 2011

Location
- Interactive map of Danyang–Kunshan Grand Bridge

The Danyang–Kunshan Grand Bridge (simplified Chinese: 丹昆特大桥; traditional Chinese: 丹昆特大橋; pinyin: Dān-Kūn tèdà qiáo) is a 164.8-kilometre-long (102.4 mi) viaduct on the Beijing–Shanghai High-Speed Railway. It is the longest bridge in the world since its designation by Guinness World Record in 2011.

== Bridge facts ==
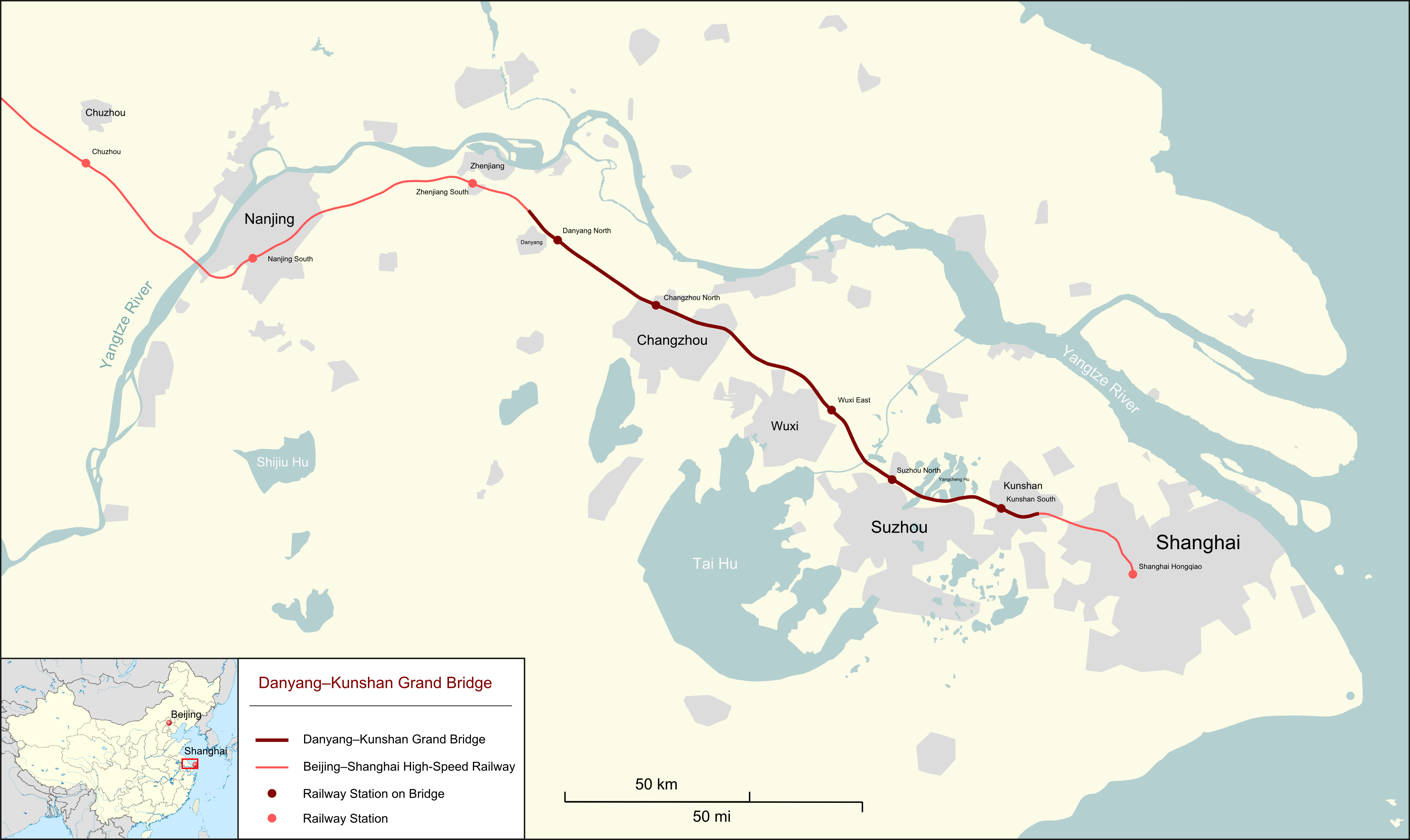
Map of the bridge

The bridge is located on the rail line between Shanghai and Nanjing in Jiangsu province. It is in the Yangtze River Delta, where the geography is characterized by lowland rice paddies, canals, rivers, and lakes. The bridge runs roughly parallel to the Yangtze River, about 8 to 80 km (5 to 50 mi) south of the river. It passes through the northern edges of population centers (from west to east) beginning in Danyang, Changzhou, Wuxi, Suzhou, and ending in Kunshan. There is a 9-kilometre-long (5.6 mi) section over open water across Yangcheng Lake in Suzhou.

Construction was completed in 2010 and the bridge opened in 2011. Employing 10,000 people, the project took four years and cost about $8.5 billion. The bridge currently holds the Guinness World Record for the longest bridge in the world in any category as of June 2011.

== Designer ==
The China Road and Bridge Corporation (CRBC), a subsidiary of China Communications Construction Company designed and built the bridge. It is a Chinese government-funded company which was originally part of the Foreign Aid Office of the Ministry of Communications of China. This company leads major civil engineering projects in China like highways, railways, bridges, ports, and tunnels.

== See also ==
- Qingdao Jiaozhou Bay Bridge, also known as Qingdao Haiwan Bridge.
- Hong Kong–Zhuhai–Macau Bridge
- List of longest bridges

Records
Preceded by Changhua–Kaohsiung Viaduct	World's longest bridge 2010–present	Succeeded by Incumbent
Preceded by Changhua–Kaohsiung Viaduct	World's longest railway bridge 2010–present	Succeeded by Incumbent
