= Chacahoula Swamp Bridge =

Bridge in Louisiana, United States

- Coordinates: 29.695251°N 90.872111°W
- Carries: US 90
- Crosses: Chacahoula Swamp
- Locale: Terrebonne Parish
- Maintained by: LA DOTD

Characteristics
- Total length: 29,544 ft (9,005 m)

History
- Opened: 1995

The Chacahoula Swamp Bridge is a twin concrete trestle bridge in the U.S. state of Louisiana. With a total length of 29,544 ft (9,005 m), it is one of the longest bridges in the world. The bridge carries US 90 over the Chacahoula Swamp in Louisiana The bridge was opened in 1995.

== See also ==
- List of bridges in the United States
- List of longest bridges in the world
