= Shijiazhuang-Hengshui-Cangzhou-Huanghua Port Intercity Railway =

Railway network in China

Shijiazhuang-Hengshui-Cangzhou-Huanghua Port Intercity Railway under construction

The Shijiazhuang-Hengshui-Cangzhou-Huanghua Port Intercity Railway is a railway network in the Beijing-Tianjin-Hebei urban area. The project is currently under construction.

== Information on the railway ==
The railway is expected to serve as a connector between the Beijing-Guangzhou High-Speed Railway, Beijing-Hong Kong High-Speed Railway, Beijing-Shanghai High-Speed Railway, and the Coastal Corridor.

The railway stretches 333.8 kilometers from Shijiazhuang Station in the west to Bohai New Area Station in the east, with 224 kilometers being newly built. It is designed for a speed of 250 kilometers per hour, utilizing the existing Shijiazhuang-Jinan High Speed Railway for the section from Shijiazhuang to Hengshui. The line will have a total of 16 stations, including 11 new stations and one reserved station.

== History ==
In September 2015, the China Railway Design Corporation published the "Environmental Impact Report on the Planning and Revision of the Beijing-Tianjin-Hebei Intercity Railway Network," which included "The Shijiazhuang-Hengshui-Cangzhou-Huanghua Port Intercity Railway" as part of the framework of the "Four Verticals, Four Horizontals, and One Ring" intercity railway network in the Beijing-Tianjin-Hebei region.

On August 5, 2020, the railway officially entered the construction phase.
