= Dezhou East railway station =

Railway station in Dezhou, Shandong, China

Dezhoudong 德州东
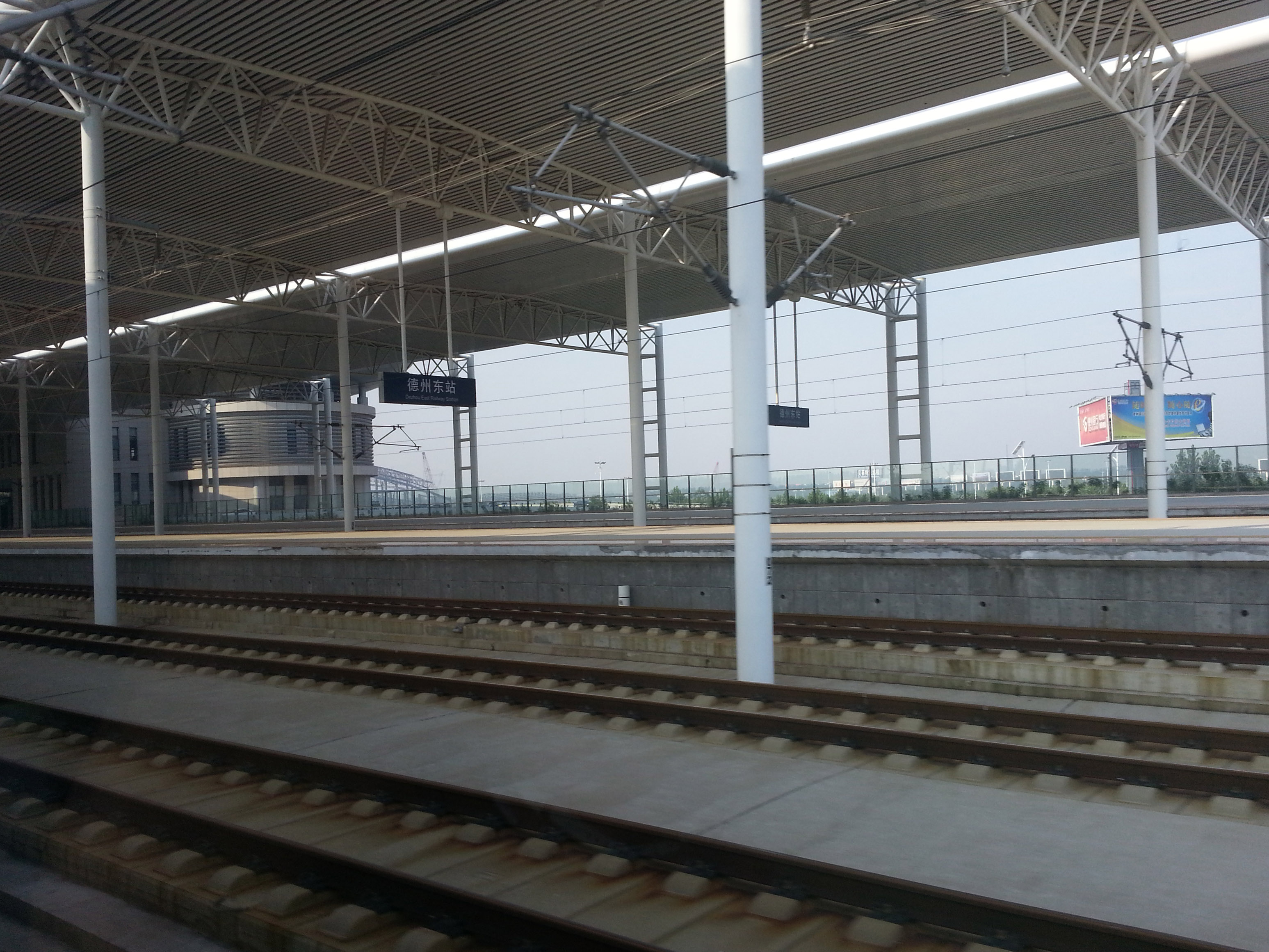

General information
- Location: Decheng District, Dezhou, Shandong; China
- Coordinates: 37.408442°N 116.456075°E
- Operated by: China Railway Beijing Group
- Lines: Beijing–Shanghai high-speed railway; Shijiazhuang–Jinan passenger railway
- Platforms: 5

Other information
- Station code: TMIS code: 66809; Telegraph code: DIP; Pinyin code: DZD

History
- Opened: June 30, 2011
Location

Dezhou East railway station (simplified Chinese: 德州东站; traditional Chinese: 德州東站; pinyin: Dézhōudōng Zhàn) is a high-speed railway station in Dezhou, Shandong, China. It is served by the Beijing–Shanghai high-speed railway and the Shijiazhuang–Jinan passenger railway.

== Station information ==
Dezhou East Station is located near the Economic Development Zone in Dezhou City.

The station has 5 platforms and a total of 13 tracks. The design of Dezhou East Station symbolizes the "Rising Sun", with the railway representing the horizon and the curved shape of the station building resembling a rising sun. The main building covers an area of nearly 20,000 square meters.

Preceding station	China Railway High-speed	Following station
Cangzhou West towards Beijing South or Tianjin West	Beijing–Shanghai high-speed railway	Jinan West towards Shanghai Hongqiao
Jingzhou towards Shijiazhuang	Shijiazhuang–Jinan high-speed railway	Pingyuan East towards Jinan East
