= Xinji South railway station =

Railway station in Hebei, China

Xinji South 辛集南

General information
- Location: Xinji, Shijiazhuang, Hebei; China
- Coordinates: 37.881970°N 115.204726°E
- Line: Shijiazhuang–Jinan High-Speed Railway

Other information
- Station code: Telegraph code: IJP; Pinyin code: XJN
Location

Xinji South railway station is a railway station of Shiji Passenger Railway located in Xinji, Shijiazhuang, Hebei People's Republic of China.

Preceding station	China Railway High-speed	Following station
Gaocheng South towards Shijiazhuang	Shijiazhuang–Jinan high-speed railway	Hengshui North towards Jinan East
