= Beijing–Shanghai high-speed railway =

Railway line in China

Coordinates: 35.5291°N 118.8045°E

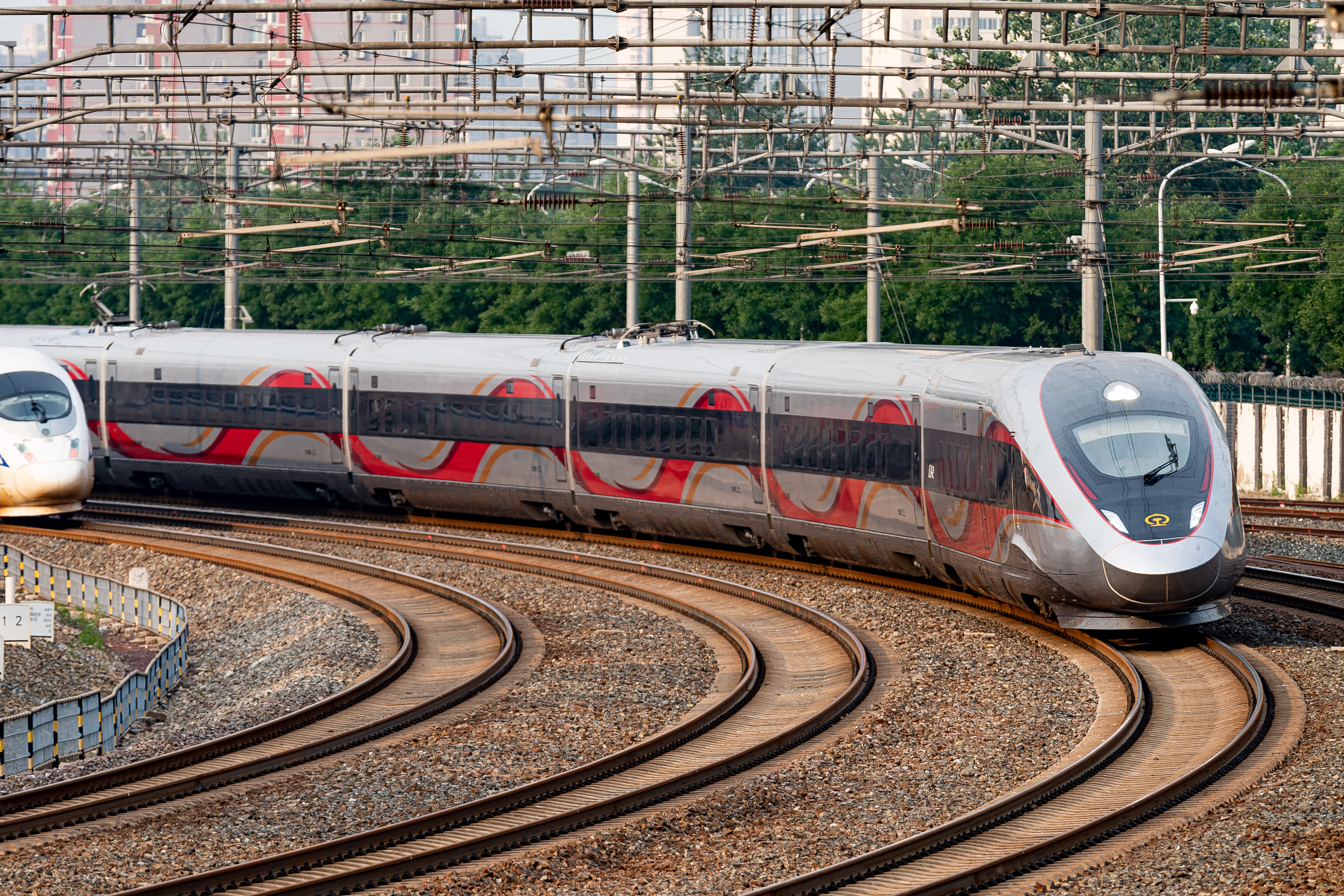

Overview
- Other name: Jinghu high-speed railway
- Native name: 京沪高速铁路 京沪高铁 京沪客运专线
- Status: Operational
- Owner: Beijing–Shanghai high-speed railway Co., Ltd.
- Locale: North and East China
- Termini: Beijing South; Shanghai Hongqiao/Shanghai
- Stations: 24
- Website: www.cr-jh.cn

Service
- Type: High-speed rail
- System: China Railway High-speed
- Operators: CR Beijing; CR Jinan; CR Shanghai
- Rolling stock: CRH380A, CRH380AL, CRH380B, CRH380BL, CRH380CL, CRH380D; CR400AF, CR400BF, CR400AF-A, CR400BF-A, CR400AF-B, CR400BF-B, CR400BF-BZ, CR400BF-Z, CR400AF-B, CR400AF-Z, CR400AF-BZ
- Ridership: 798,000 (daily record); 210 million per year (2019); 180 million per year (2017); 1.35 billion first 10 years

History
- Work began: 18 April 2008; 18 years ago
- Opened: 30 June 2011; 15 years ago

Technical
- Line length: 1,318 km (819 mi); 1,302 km (809 mi) (main line)
- Character: Elevated
- Track gauge: 1,435 mm (4 ft 8 1/2 in) standard gauge
- Minimum radius: mostly 7,000 m (4.3 mi) or 400 m (0.25 mi) near Beijing South
- Electrification: 25 kV 50 Hz AC (Overhead line)
- Operating speed: 350 km/h (220 mph)
- Maximum incline: 2%

Chinese name
- Simplified Chinese: 京沪高速铁路
- Traditional Chinese: 京滬高速鐵路
Transcriptions
Standard Mandarin
- Hanyu Pinyin: Jīnghù Gāosù Tiělù
Wu
- Romanization: Cin^{1}wu^{2} Kau^{1}soh^{4} Thih^{4}lu^{3}
Route map
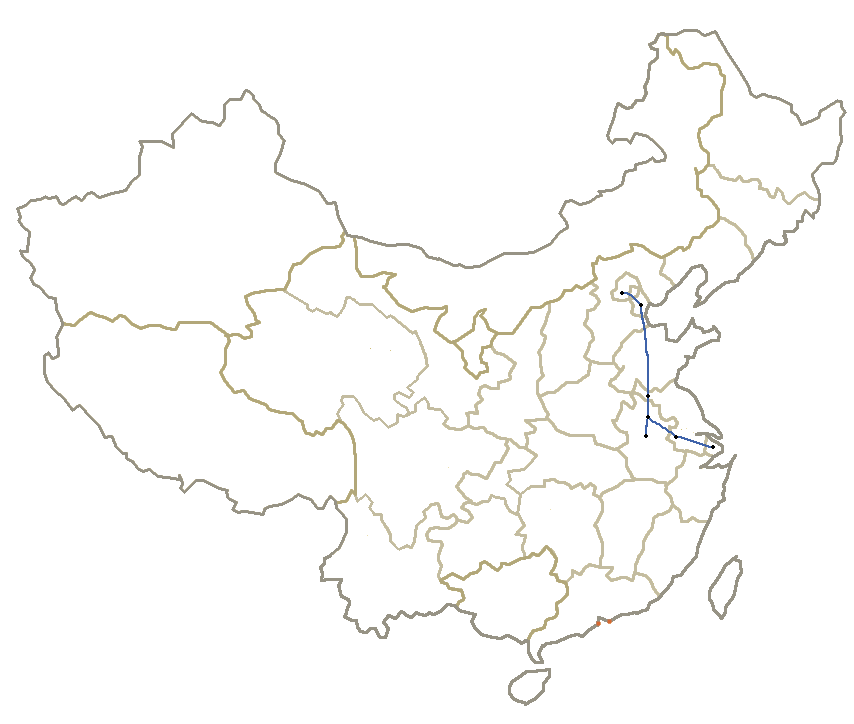

Beijing–Shanghai high-speed railway Co., Ltd.
- Type: Public
- Traded as: SSE: 601816; SSE 50 component; FTSE A50 component; CSI A50 component
- Industry: Transportation
- Revenue: CN¥25,238,431,430 (2020)
- Website: http://www.cr-jh.cn/index

The Beijing–Shanghai high-speed railway (or Jinghu high-speed railway) is a high-speed railway that connects two major economic zones in the People's Republic of China: the Bohai Economic Rim and the Yangtze River Delta. Construction began on April 18, 2008, with the line opened to the public for commercial service on June 30, 2011. The 1,318-kilometer (819 mi) long high-speed line is the world's longest high-speed line ever constructed in a single phase.

The line is one of the busiest high speed railways in the world, transporting over 210 million passengers in 2019, more than the annual ridership of the entire TGV or Intercity Express network. It is also China's most profitable high speed rail line, reporting a ¥11.9 billion Yuan ($1.86 billion USD) net profit in 2019.

The non-stop train from Beijing South station to Shanghai Hongqiao station was expected to take 3 hours and 58 minutes, making it the fastest scheduled train in the world, compared to 9 hours and 49 minutes on the fastest trains running on the parallel conventional railway. At first trains were limited to a maximum speed of 300 km/h (186 mph), with the fastest train taking 4 hours and 48 minutes to travel from Beijing South to Shanghai Hongqiao, with one stop at Nanjing South. On September 21, 2017, 350 km/h (217 mph) operation was restored with the introduction of China Standardized EMU. This reduced travel times between Beijing and Shanghai to about 4 hours 28 minutes on the fastest scheduled trains, attaining an average speed of 291.9 km/h (181.4 mph) over a journey of 1,302 km (809 mi) making those services the fastest in the world.

The Beijing–Shanghai high-speed railway went public on Shanghai Stock Exchange (SSE: 601816) in 2020.

== Specifications ==
The Beijing–Shanghai High-Speed Railway Co., Ltd. was in charge of construction. The project was expected to cost 220 billion yuan (about $32 billion). An estimated 220,000 passengers are expected to use the trains each day, which is double the current capacity. During peak hours, trains should run every five minutes. 1,140 km (708 mi), or 87% of the railway, is elevated. There are 244 bridges along the line. The 164 km (102 mi) long Danyang–Kunshan Grand Bridge is the longest bridge in the world, the 114 km (71 mi) long viaduct bridge between Langfang and Qingxian is the second longest in the world, and the Cangde Grand Bridge between Beijing's 4th Ring Road and Langfang is the fifth longest. The line also includes 22 tunnels, totaling 16.1 km (10.0 mi). A total of 1,268 km (788 mi) of the length is ballastless.

According to Zhang Shuguang, then deputy chief designer of China's high-speed railway network, the designed continuous operating speed is 350 km/h (217 mph), with a maximum speed of up to 380 km/h (236 mph). The average commercial speed from Beijing to Shanghai was planned to be 330 km/h (205 mph), which would have cut the train travel time from 10 hours to 4 hours. The rolling stock used on this line consists mainly of CRH380 trains. The CTCS-3 based train control system is used on the line, to allow for a maximum speed of 380 km/h (236 mph) of running and a minimum train interval of 3 minutes. With power consumption of 20 MW (27,000 hp) and capacity of about 1,050 passengers, the energy consumption per passenger from Beijing to Shanghai should be less than 80 kWh.

== History ==
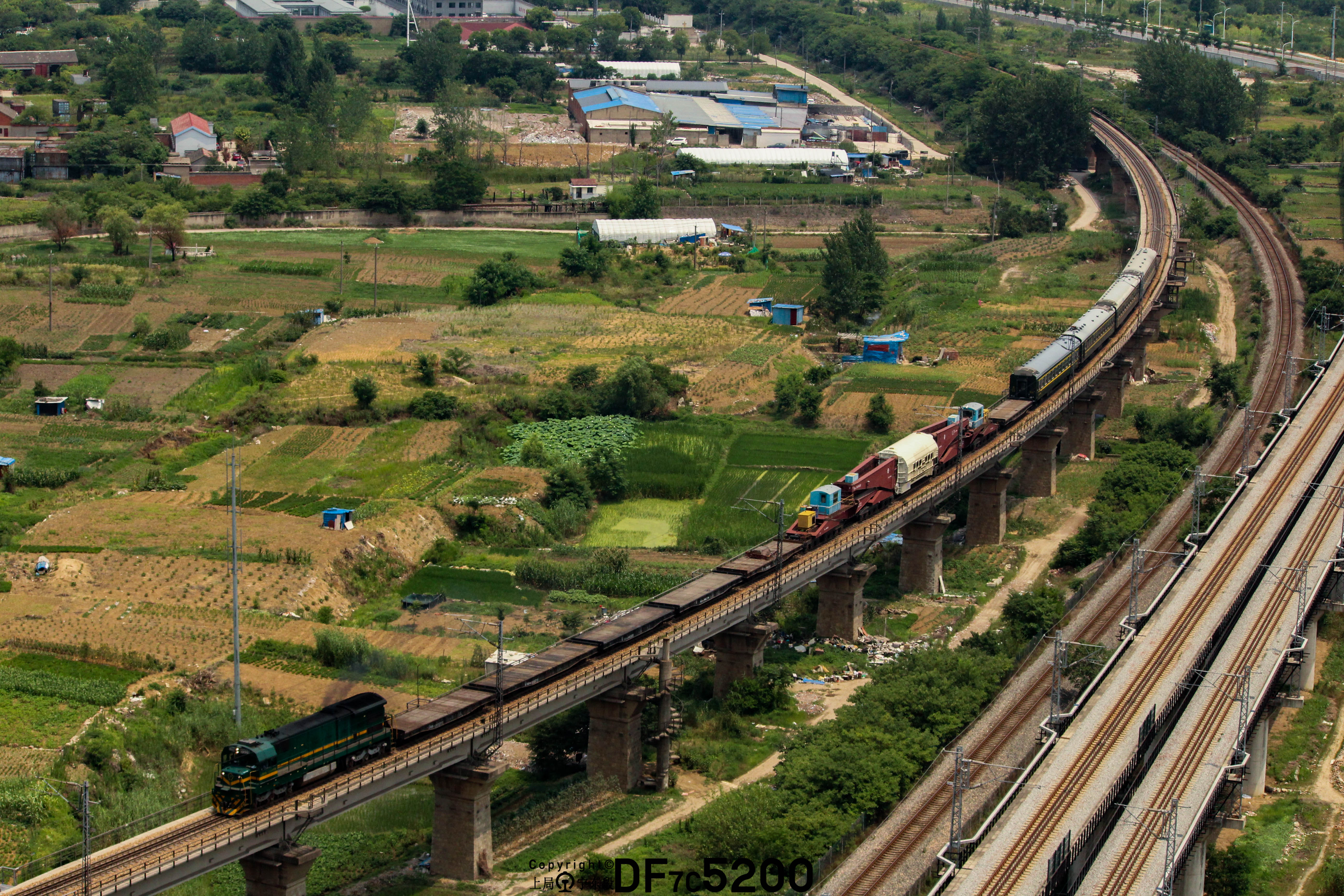
The Beijing–Shanghai high-speed railway (far right) paralleled by the older Beijing–Shanghai Railway (on the left).

Beijing and Shanghai were not linked by rail until 1912, when the Jinpu railway was completed between Tianjin and Pukou. With the existing railway between Beijing and Tianjin, which was completed in 1900, the Huning railway between Nanjing and Shanghai opened in 1908, interrupted by a ferry between Pukou and Nanjing across the Yangtze River. A weekly Beijing–Shanghai direct train was first introduced in 1913.

In 1933, a train ride from Beijing to Shanghai took around 44 hours, at an average speed of 33 km/h (21 mph). Passengers had to get off in Pukou with their luggage, board a ferry named "Kuaijie" across the Yangtze, and get on another connecting train in Xiaguan on the other side of the river.

In 1933, the Nanjing Train Ferry was opened for service. The new train ferry, "Changjiang" (Yangtze), built by a British company, was 113.3 m (371 ft 9 in) long, 17.86 m (58 ft 7 in) wide, was able to carry 21 freight cars or 12 passenger cars. Passengers could remain on the train when crossing the river, and the travel time was thus cut to around 36 hours. The train service was suspended during the Japanese invasion.

In 1949, from Shanghai's North railway station toward Beijing (then Beiping) it took 36 hours, 50 minutes, at an average speed of 40 km/h (24.9 mph). In 1956 the trip time was cut to 28 hours, 17 minutes. In the early 1960s, the travel time was further cut down to 23 hours, 39 minutes.

In October 1968, the Nanjing Yangtze River Bridge was opened. The travel time was cut to 21 hours, 34 minutes. As new diesel locomotives were introduced in the 1970s, the speed was increased further. In 1986, the travel time was 16 hours, 59 minutes.

China introduced six line schedule reductions from 1997 to 2007. In October 2001, train T13/T14 took about 14 hours from Beijing to Shanghai. On April 18, 2004, Z-series trains were introduced. The trip time was cut to 11 hours, 58 minutes. There were five trains departing around 7 pm every day, each 7 minutes apart, arriving at their destination the next morning.

The railway was completely electrified in 2006. On April 18, 2007, the new CRH bullet train was introduced on the upgraded railway as part of the Sixth Railway Speed-Up Campaign. A day-time train D31 served the route, departing from Beijing at 10:50 every morning, and arriving at Shanghai at 20:49 in the evening, travelling mostly at 160–200 km/h (99–124 mph) (up to 250 km/h (155 mph) in a very short section between Anting and Shanghai West). In 2008 overnight sleeper CRH trains were introduced, replacing the locomotive-hauled Z sleeper trains. With a new high-speed intercity line opening between Nanjing and Shanghai in the summer of 2010, the sleeper trains made use of the high-speed line in the Shanghai–Nanjing section, travelling at 250 km/h (155 mph) for a longer distance. The fastest sleeper trains took 9 hours, 49 minutes, with four intermediate stops, at an average speed of 149 km/h (93 mph).

As the Nanjing Yangtze Bridge connected the two sections of the railway into a continuous line, the entire railway between Beijing and Shanghai was renamed the Jinghu Railway, with Jing (京) being the standard Chinese abbreviation for Beijing, and Hu (沪), short for Shanghai. The Jinghu Railway has served as China's busiest railway for nearly a century. Due to rapid growth in passenger and freight traffic in the last 20 years, this line has reached and surpassed capacity.

=== Dedicated high-speed rail proposal ===
The Jinghu high-speed railway was proposed in the early 1990s, because one quarter of the country's population lived along the existing Beijing-Shanghai rail line In December 1990, the Ministry of Railways submitted to the National People's Congress a proposal to build the Beijing–Shanghai high speed railway parallel to the existing Beijing–Shanghai railway line. In 1995, Premier Li Peng announced that work on the Beijing–Shanghai high-speed railway would begin in the 9th Five Year Plan (1996–2000). The Ministry's initial design for the high-speed rail line was completed, and a report was submitted for state approval in June 1998. The construction plan was set in 2004, after a five-year debate on whether to use steel-on-steel rail track, or maglev technology. Maglev was not chosen due to its incompatibility with China's existing rail-and-track technology and its high price, which is two times higher than that of conventional rail technology.

==== Technology debate ====
Although engineers originally said construction could take until 2015, the China's Ministry of Railways initially promised a 2010 opening date for the new line. However, the Ministry did not anticipate an ensuing debate over the possible use of maglev technology. Although more traditional steel-on-steel rail technology was chosen for the railway, the technology debate resulted in a substantial delay of the railway's feasibility studies, completed in March 2006. The current rolling stock is the CRH380AL, which is a Chinese electric high-speed train that was developed by China South Locomotive & Rolling Stock Corporation Limited (CSR). CRH380A is one of the four Chinese train series which have been designed for the new standard operating speed of 380 km/h (236 mph) on newly constructed Chinese high-speed main lines. The other three are CRH380B, CRH380C and CRH380D.

==== Engineering challenges ====
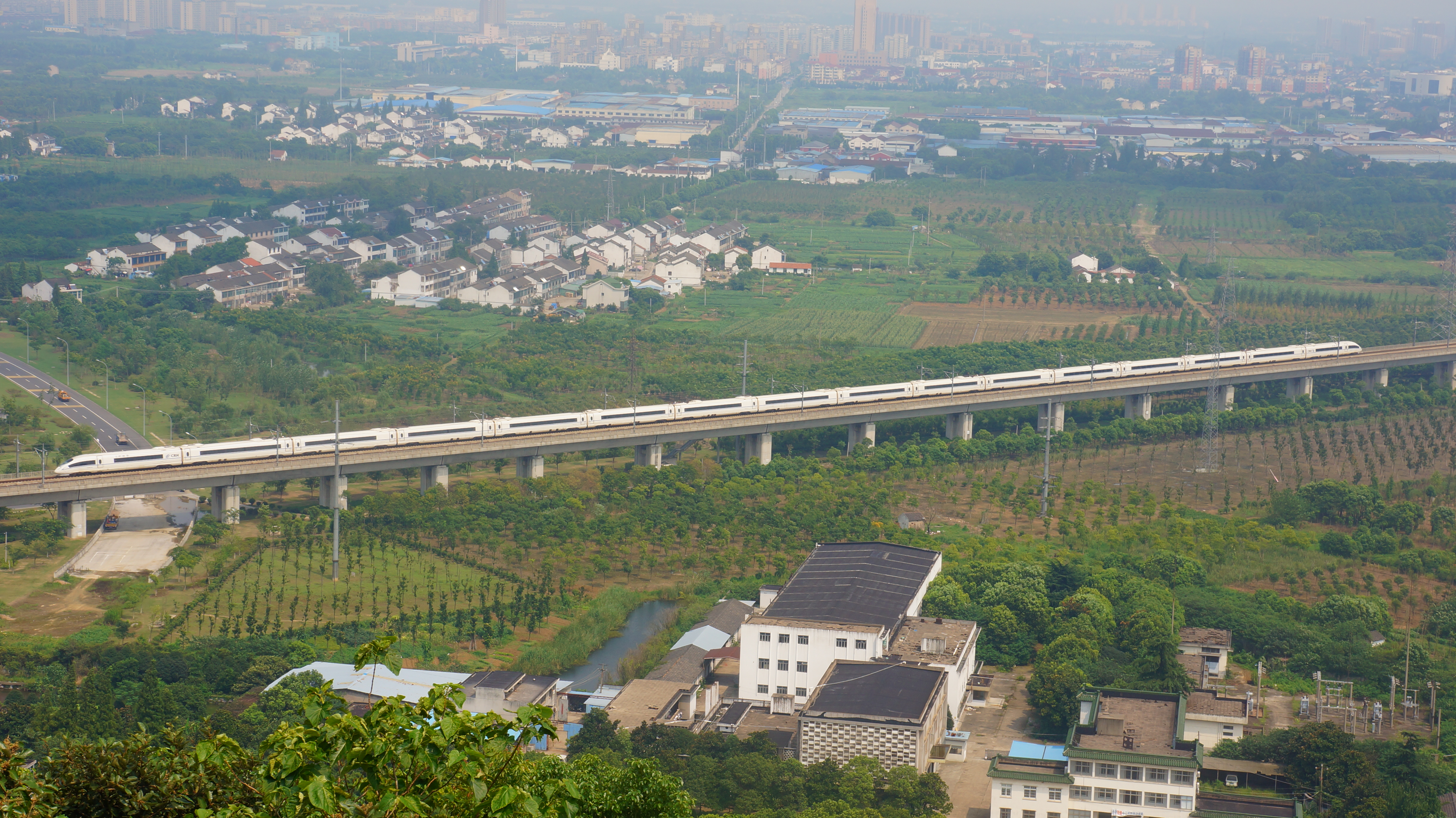
A segment of the railway near Wuxi, between Shanghai and Nanjing

Testing began shortly thereafter on the main line section between Shanghai and Nanjing. This section of the line sits on the soft soil of the Yangtze Delta, providing engineers an example of the more difficult challenges they would face in later construction. In addition to these challenges, high speed trains use extensive amounts of aluminium alloy, with specially designed windscreen glass capable of withstanding avian impacts.

=== Construction ===
Construction work began on April 18, 2008. Track-laying was started on July 19, 2010, and completed on November 15, 2010. On December 3, 2010, a 16-car CRH380AL trainset set a speed record of 486.1 km/h (302.0 mph) on the Zaozhuang West to Bengbu section of the line during a test run. On January 10, 2011, another 16-car modified CRH380BL train set a speed record of 487.3 km/h (302.8 mph) during a test run. The overhead catenary work was completed on February 4, 2011 for the entire line. According to CCTV, more than 130,000 construction workers and engineers were at work at the peak of the construction phase.

According to the Ministry of Railways, construction has used twice as much concrete as the Three Gorges Dam, and 120 times the amount of steel in the Beijing National Stadium. There are 244 bridges and 22 tunnels built to standardized designs, and the route is monitored by 321 seismic, 167 windspeed and 50 rainfall sensors.

=== Start of service ===
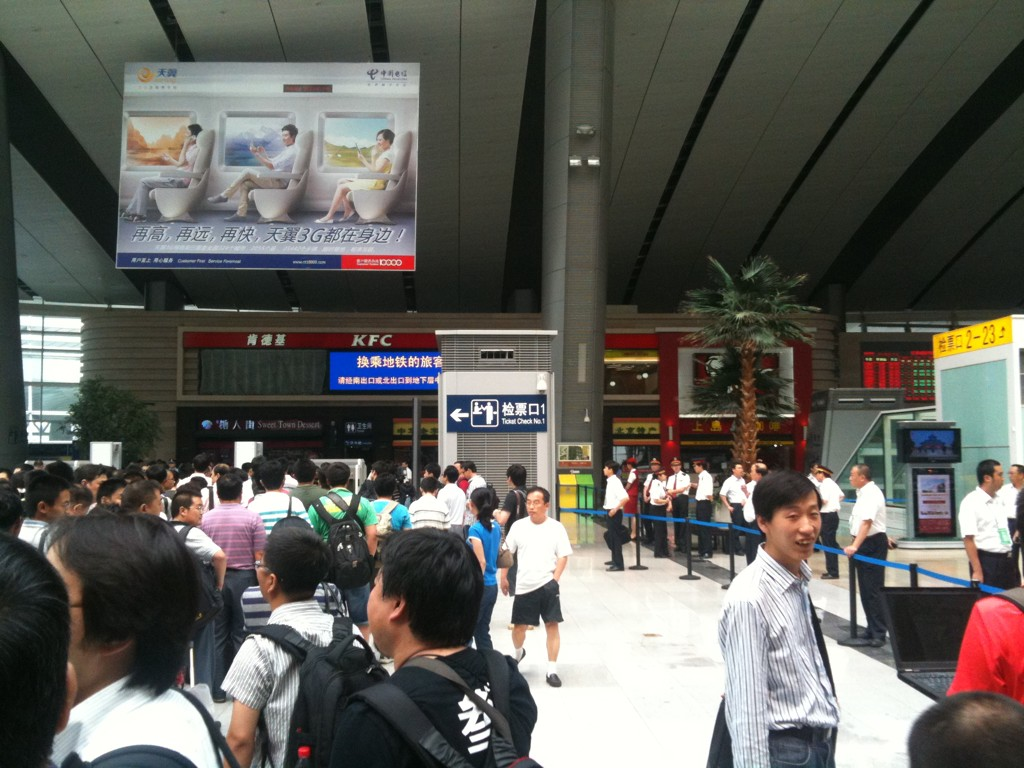
Security check line at Beijing South Station at opening of the Beijing–Shanghai high-speed railway

Tickets were put on sale at 09:00 on June 24, 2011, and sold out within an hour. To compete with the new train service, airlines slashed the cost of flights between Beijing and Shanghai by up to 65%. Economy air fares between Beijing and Shanghai fell by 52%.

Sleeper bullet trains on the upgraded railway were cancelled at the beginning, but later resumed. The new line will increase the freight capacity of the old line by 50 million tons per year between Beijing and Shanghai.

In its second week in service, the system experienced three malfunctions in four days. On July 10, 2011, trains were delayed after heavy winds and a thunderstorm caused power supply problems in Shandong. On July 12, 2011, trains were delayed again when another power failure occurred in Suzhou. On July 13, 2011, a transformer malfunction in Changzhou forced a train to halve its top speed, forcing passengers to take a backup train. Within two weeks after opening, airline prices had rebounded due to frequent malfunctions on the line. Airline ticket sales were only down 5% in July 2011 compared to June 2011, after the opening of the line. On August 12, 2011, after several delays caused by equipment problems, 54 CRH380BL trains running on this line were recalled by their manufacturer. They returned to regular service on November 16, 2011. A spokesman for the Ministry of Railways apologized for the glitches and delays, stating that in the two weeks since service had begun only 85.6% of trains had arrived on time.

== Finances ==
In 2006, it was estimated that the line would cost between CN¥130 billion (US$16.25 billion) and ¥170 billion ($21.25 billion). The following year, the estimated cost had revised to ¥200 billion ($25 billion), or ¥150 million per kilometer. Due to rapid rises in the costs of labor, construction materials and land acquisitions over the previous years, by July 2008, the estimated cost was increased to ¥220 billion ($32 billion). By then, the state-owned company Beijing–Shanghai high-speed railway, established to raise funds for the project, had raised ¥110 billion, with the remaining to be sourced from local governments, share offerings, bank loans and, for the first time for a railway project, foreign investment. In the end, investment in the project totaled ¥217.6 billion ($34.7 billion).

In 2016 it was revealed, that last year the Beijing–Shanghai High-Speed Railway Company (BSHSRC) has total assets of ¥181.54 billion ($28 billion), revenue ¥23.42 billion ($3.6 billion) and a net profit ¥6.58 billion (US$1 billion), thus being labeled as the most profitable railway line in the world. In 2019, Jinghu Express Railway Company submitted an application for an IPO. The company announced that the Jinghu HSR recorded a net profit of ¥9.5 billion (US$1.35 billion) in the first nine months of 2019.

In 2020, BSHSRC went public, as the first high-speed rail operator in China. The proceeds of the IPO will be used to purchase a 65% stake in the Beijing Fuzhou Railway Passenger Dedicated Line Anhui Company, which operates the Hefei–Bengbu high-speed railway, Hefei–Fuzhou high-speed railway (Anhui section), Shangqiu–Hangzhou high-speed railway (Anhui section, still under construction) and Zhengzhou–Fuyang high-speed railway (Anhui section).

== Rolling stock ==
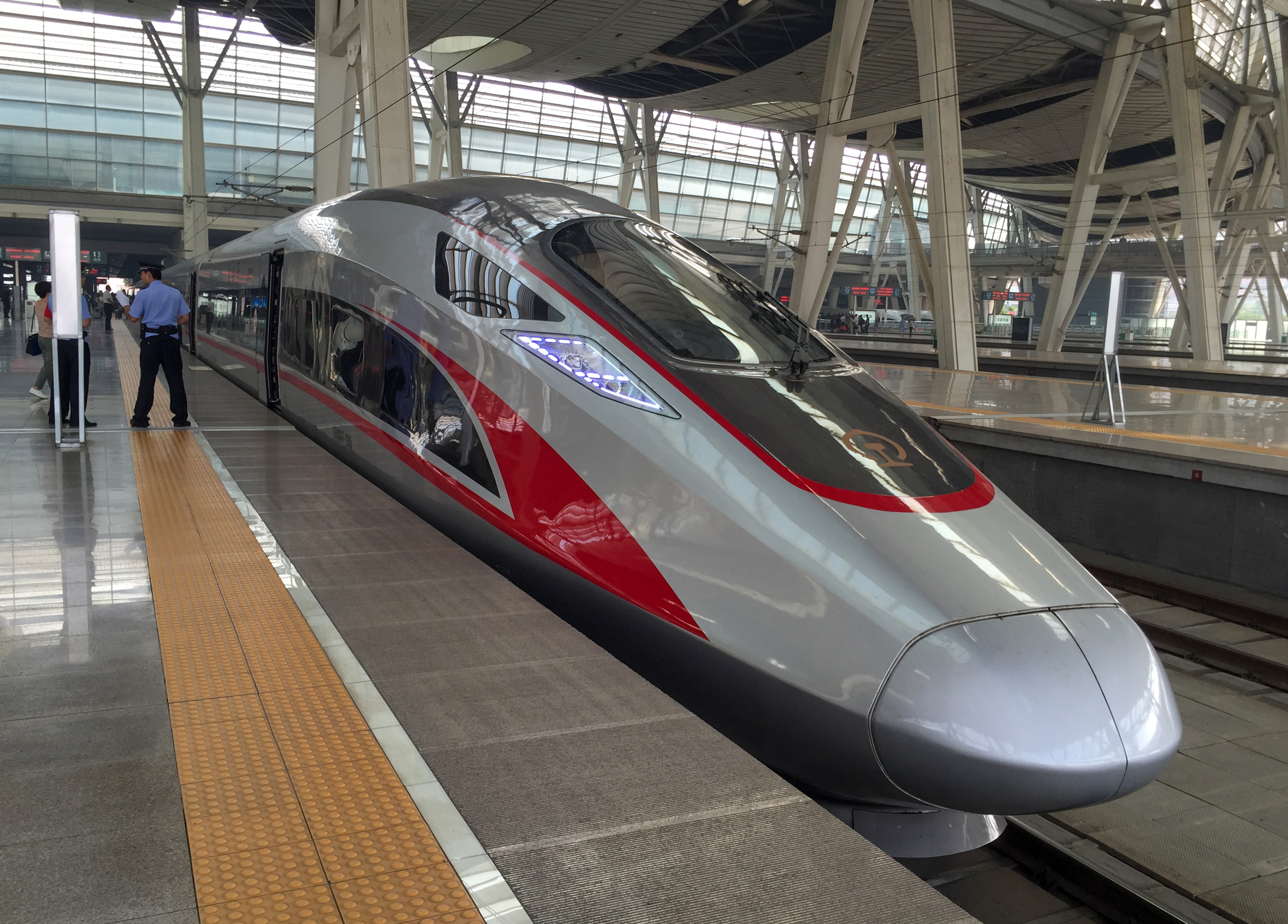
A CR400AF trainset waiting for departure at Beijing South railway station as G1 in September 2017; From September 21, 2017, 7 pairs of Beijing-Shanghai high-speed trains will run at 350 km/h, using CR400AF or CR400BF

350 km/h (217 mph) services use the CR400AF, CR400BF, CRH380A, CRH380B, and CRH380C trainsets, prior to 2014 slower 250 km/h (155 mph) services use CRH2 and CRH5 trainsets. First and Second Class coaches are available on all trains. On the shorter trains, a six-person Premier Class compartment is available. Available on the longer trains are up to 28 Business Class seats and a full-length dining car.

== Operation and ridership ==
More than 90 trains a day run between Beijing South and Shanghai Hongqiao from 07:00 until 18:00.

The line's average ridership in its initial two weeks of operation was 165,000 passengers daily, while 80,000 passengers every day continued to ride on the slower and less expensive old railway. The figure of 165,000 daily riders was three-quarters of the forecast of 220,000 daily riders. After the opening passengers numbers continued to grow, with 230,000 passengers using the line each day by 2013. By March 2013, the line had carried 100 million passengers. By 2015, ridership grew to 489,000 passengers per day. By 2017, average ridership reached over 500,000 passengers per day.

This line is gradually gaining popularity through the years and it is reaching its capacity at weekends and holidays. With the introduction of the China Standardized EMU, the highest operation speed of the line is raised to 350 km/h (217 mph) on September 21, 2017. The fastest train will complete the journey in 4 hours 18 minutes (G7), while making two stops along the trip at Jinan and Nanjing.

In 2019, in response to high passenger demand 17-car-long Fuxing trains started operating on the line.

== Fares ==
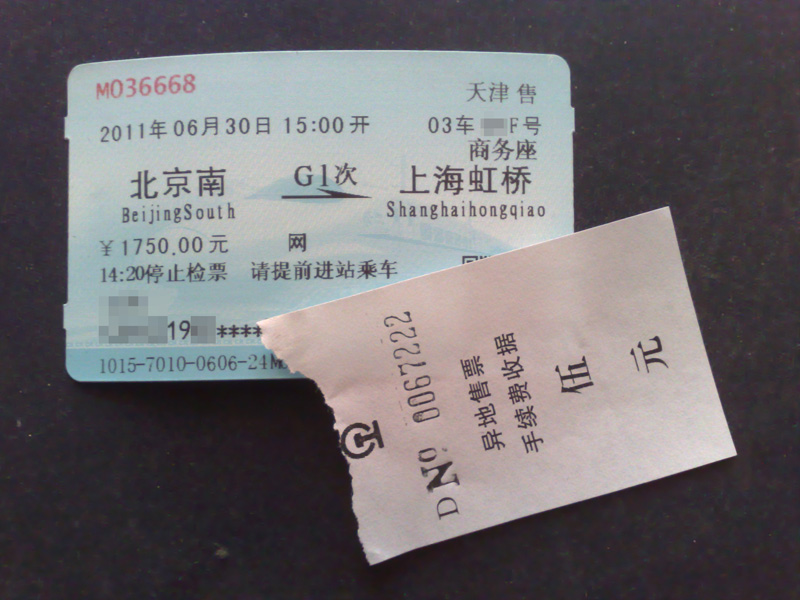
First-class train ticket from Beijing South to Shanghai Hongqiao.

On June 13, 2011, the list of fares was announced at a Ministry of Railways press conference. The fares from Beijing South to Shanghai Hongqiao in RMB Yuan are listed below:

Speed	2nd-class seat	1st-class seat	VIP Seat (Sightseeing Seat)	Quickest Journey Time	Daily services
G(350 km/h)	555	935	1748	4h24m	94

Note: ^{*}Only available on services using the CRH380AL, CRH380BL and CRH380CL trains

== Online ticketing service ==
Passengers can buy tickets online. If the passenger uses a 2nd-generation PRC ID Card or an International Passport, they can use this card or document directly as the ticket to enter the station and pass the ticketing gates.

== Components ==
Section	Description	Designed speed (km/h)	Length (km)	Construction start date	Open date
Beijing–Shanghai high-speed railway	HSR Corridor of East China	350	1433	8 January 2008	16 October 2012
Beijing–Shanghai Section (Beijing–Shanghai high-speed railway)	HSR from Beijing to Shanghai via Tianjin, Jinan, Xuzhou, Bengbu and Nanjing	350	1302	18 April 2008	30 June 2011
Hefei–Bengbu section (Hefei–Bengbu high-speed railway)	Spur off Jinghu HSR from Bengbu to Hefei	350	131	8 January 2008	16 October 2012

== Stations and service ==
There are 24 stations on the line. Cruise speeds are 300 and 350 km/h (186 and 217 mph) depending on services. Fare are calculated based on distance traveled regardless of speed and travel time. More than 40 pairs of daily scheduled train services travel end-to-end along this route, and hundreds more that only use a segment of it.

Station Name	Chinese	Total distance (km)	Travel Time		High-speed rail transfers*	Metro transfers*	Platforms	Tracks served by platform	Location	
Station Name	Chinese	Total distance (km)	350 km/h	300 km/h	High-speed rail transfers*	Metro transfers*	Platforms	Tracks served by platform	Location	
Beijing South	北京南	0	0:00	0:00	Beijing–Tianjin intercity railway	4 14	13	24	Beijing	
Langfang	廊坊	59		0:20			2	2	Langfang	Hebei
Tianjin West	天津西	Not on main line			Beijing–Tianjin intercity railway Tianjin–Qinhuangdao high-speed railway (through connection line with Tianjin railway station); Tianjin–Baoding intercity railway	Tianjin Metro (Tianjin Metro Group Co., Ltd.) Tianjin Metro Line 1 Tianjin Metro Line 6	13	24	Tianjin	
Tianjin South	天津南	131	0:31	0:31		Tianjin Metro (Tianjin Metro Group Co., Ltd.) Tianjin Metro Line 3	2	4	Tianjin	
Cangzhou West	沧州西	219	0:48	0:48			2	4	Cangzhou	Hebei
Dezhou East	德州东	327	1:13	1:13	Shijiazhuang–Jinan high-speed railway (part of the Qingdao–Taiyuan high-speed railway)		3	5	Dezhou	Shandong
Jinan West	济南西	419	1:22	1:30	Zhengzhou–Jinan high-speed railway	1	8	15	Jinan	Shandong
Tai'an	泰安	462		1:34			2	4	Tai'an	Shandong
Qufu East	曲阜东	533	2:04	2:10	Rizhao–Lankao high-speed railway Jinan–Zaozhuang high-speed railway		2	4	Qufu	Shandong
Tengzhou East	滕州东	589		2:19	Jinan–Zaozhuang high-speed railway		2	4	Tengzhou	Shandong
Zaozhuang	枣庄	625	2:02	2:29			2	4	Zaozhuang	Shandong
Xuzhou East	徐州东	688	2:21	2:48	Zhengzhou–Xuzhou high-speed railway (part of the Xuzhou–Lanzhou high-speed railway)	1	7	13	Xuzhou	Jiangsu
Suzhou East	宿州东	767		3:10			2	4	Suzhou	Anhui
Bengbu South	蚌埠南	844	2:57	3:23	Hefei–Bengbu high-speed railway		5	9	Bengbu	Anhui
Dingyuan	定远	897		3:46			2	4	Dingyuan	Anhui
Chuzhou	滁州	959		3:52			2	4	Chuzhou	Anhui
Nanjing South	南京南	1018	3:14	3:24	Hefei–Nanjing Passenger Railway (part of the Shanghai–Wuhan–Chengdu passenger-dedicated railway); Nanjing–Hangzhou Passenger Railway; Shanghai–Nanjing intercity railway (part of the Shanghai–Wuhan–Chengdu passenger-dedicated railway); Shanghai–Nanjing Riverside high-speed railway Nanjing–Anqing intercity railway	1 3 S1 S3	15	28	Nanjing	Jiangsu
Zhenjiang South	镇江南	1087	3:44	4:16			2	4	Zhenjiang	Jiangsu
Danyang North	丹阳北	1112		4:45			2	4	Danyang	Jiangsu
Changzhou North	常州北	1144	3:56	4:44		1	2	4	Changzhou	Jiangsu
Wuxi East	无锡东	1201	3:55	5:02		2	2	4	Wuxi	Jiangsu
Suzhou North	苏州北	1227	4:08	5:23	Suzhou–Jiaxing intercity railway	2	2	4	Suzhou	Jiangsu
Kunshan South	昆山南	1259		5:26	Shanghai–Nanjing intercity railway (part of the Shanghai–Wuhan–Chengdu passenger-dedicated railway)		2	4	Kunshan	Jiangsu
Shanghai Hongqiao	上海虹桥	1302	4:18	5:34	Shanghai–Hangzhou high-speed railway (part of the Shanghai–Kunming high-speed railway); Shanghai–Nanjing intercity railway (part of the Shanghai–Wuhan–Chengdu passenger-dedicated railway); Shanghai–Suzhou–Huzhou high-speed railway	2 10 17; Airport Link; SHA	16	30	Shanghai	

Note:

* – Lines in italic text are under construction or planned

The travel time column in the following table only list shortest time possible to get to a certain station from Beijing. Different services make different stops along the way and there are no services that stop at every station.

== Bridges ==
The railway line has some of the longest bridges in the world. They include:

- Danyang–Kunshan Grand Bridge – longest bridge in the world.
- Tianjin Grand Bridge – fourth longest bridge in the world.
- Beijing Grand Bridge
- Cangzhou–Dezhou Grand Bridge
- Nanjing Qinhuai River Bridge
- Zhenjiang Beijing–Hangzhou Canal Bridge

== Notes ==
From its native Mandarin name.
