= Shijiazhuang–Jinan high-speed railway =

Railway line in China

Qingdao–Taiyuan high-speed railway Shijiazhuang–Jinan Section
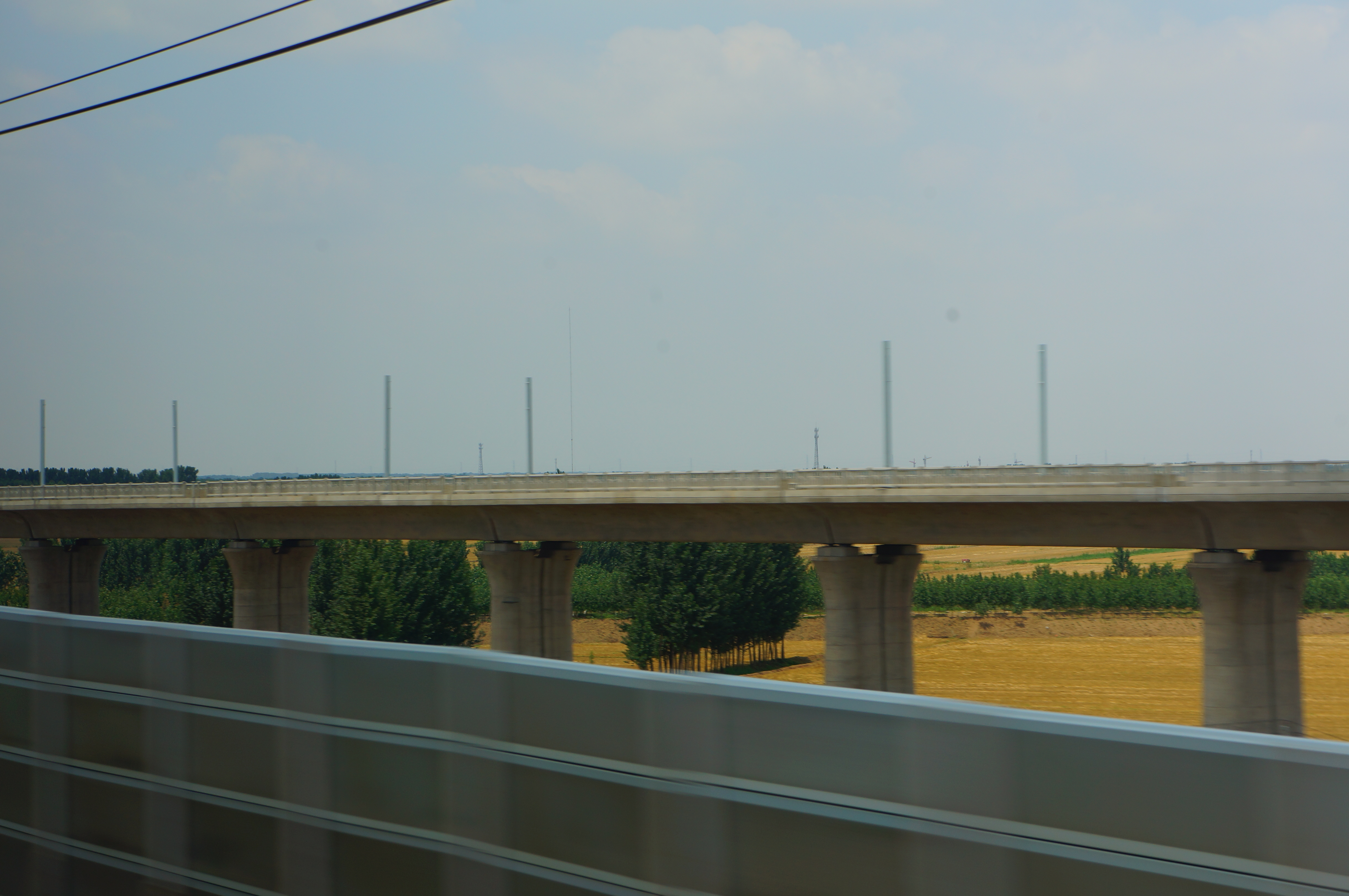

Overview
- Native name: 青太高速铁路石济段 石济客运专线
- Status: Operational
- Owner: CR Guangzhou; CR Jinan
- Locale: Hebei province; Shandong province
- Stations: 11

Service
- Type: High-speed rail
- System: China Railway High-speed
- Operator(s): CR Guangzhou; CR Jinan

History
- Opened: December 28, 2017; 7 years ago

Technical
- Number of tracks: 2 (Double-track)
- Track gauge: 1,435 mm (4 ft 8 1/2 in) standard gauge
- Electrification: 25 kV 50 Hz AC (Overhead line)
- Operating speed: 250 km/h (160 mph)

The Shijiazhuang–Jinan high-speed railway, abbreviated Shiji passenger railway (simplified Chinese: 石济客运专线; traditional Chinese: 石濟客運專線; pinyin: Shíjǐ Kèyùn Zhuān Xiàn) is a high-speed railway operated by China Railway High-speed, running between Shijiazhuang and Jinan, the provincial capitals of Hebei and Shandong, respectively. The line will additionally pass through and serve cities of Hengshui, Cangzhou and Dezhou. Traditionally, passengers travelling east from Shijiazhuang towards Shandong would need to detour towards Beijing or Tianjin. Its completion allowed trains to run directly between Shijiazhuang and Jinan at 250 km/h (160 mph), shortening travel times between the two cities from the previous 4 hours to 1 hour and 20 minutes.

== History ==
In late January 2013, it was announced that construction work on the Shijiazhuang–Jinan passenger railway would begin. The line started operation on December 28, 2017, though it terminated at Jinan West as Jinan East was yet to be completed. Jinan East was opened on 26 December 2018.

The Shijiazhuang-Hengshui-Cangzhou-Huanghua Port Intercity Railway, which is under construction, will use the tracks of Shijiazhuang–Jinan passenger railway as part of its route.

== Stations ==
Station Name	Chinese	Metro transfers/connections	China Railway transfers/connections
Shijiazhuang		2 3	
Shijiazhuang East		1	
Gaocheng South
Xinji South
Hengshui North
Jingzhou
Dezhou East			Beijing–Shanghai high-speed railway
Pingyuan East
Yucheng East
Qihe
Jinan East		3	Jinan–Qingdao high-speed railway
