= Wangfenglou =

Wangfenglou 王凤楼镇
- Town
- Location in Shandong Wangfenglou (China)
- Coordinates: 37°11′51″N 116°33′55″E
- Country: People's Republic of China
- Province: Shandong
- Prefecture-level city: Dezhou
- County: Pingyuan County
- Time zone: UTC+8 (China Standard)

Wangfenglou (Chinese: 王凤楼镇) is a town in Pingyuan County, Dezhou, in northwestern Shandong province, China.
