= Jingzhou railway station (Hebei) =

Railway station in Hebei, China

Jingzhou 景州

General information
- Location: Jingxian County, Hengshui, Hebei; China
- Coordinates: 37°38′42.07″N 116°7′57.22″E
- Operated by: China Railway High-speed
- Line: Shijiazhuang–Jinan passenger railway

History
- Opened: 28 December 2017
Location

Jingzhou railway station is a railway station in Jing County, Hengshui, Hebei, China. It opened with the Shijiazhuang–Jinan passenger railway on 28 December 2017.

Preceding station	China Railway High-speed	Following station
Hengshui North towards Shijiazhuang	Shijiazhuang–Jinan high-speed railway	Dezhou East towards Jinan East
