= CRH380 =

CRH380 refers to a series of high-speed EMUs currently operating in the high-speed rail system of China:

- CRH380A, introduced in 2010 by CRRC Qingdao Sifang.
- CRH380B, produced by CRRC Tangshan and CRRC Changchun Railway Vehicles.
- CRH380CL, evolution of CRH380B.
- CRH380D, produced by a joint-venture between Bombardier and CRRC Qingdao Sifang, the 380km/h variant of Bombardier Zefiro.
