= Tianjin Grand Bridge =

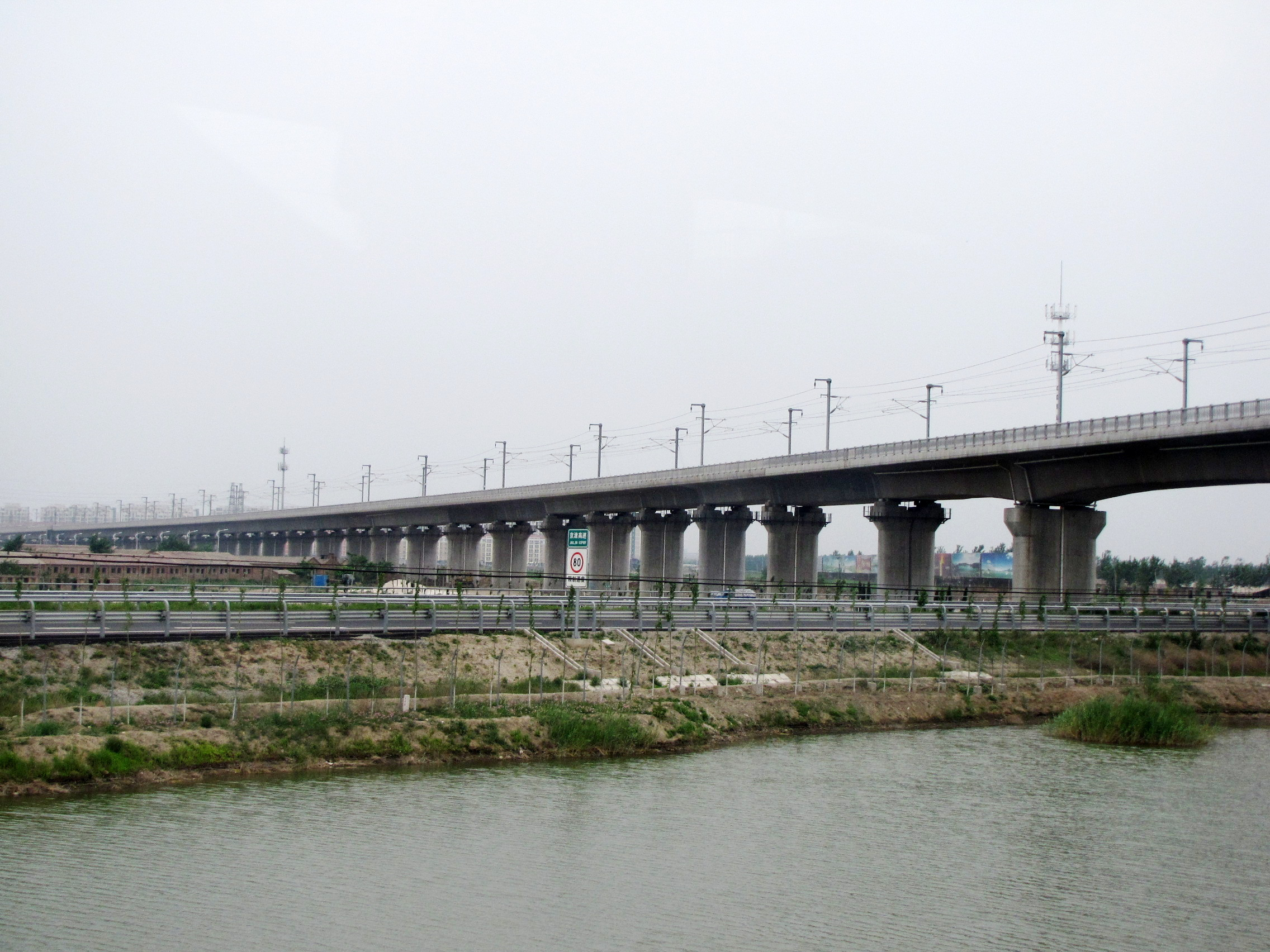
- Coordinates: 39.056084°N 117.054949°E
- Carries: Beijing–Shanghai High-Speed Railway
- Locale: Hebei, Tianjin

Characteristics
- Design: viaduct
- Total length: 113.7 km (70.6 mi)

History
- Construction start: about 2006
- Construction end: 2010
- Opened: June 30, 2011

Location
- Interactive map of Tianjin Grand Bridge

Tianjin Grand Bridge (Langfang–Qingxian viaduct) (Chinese: 天津特大桥) is a railway viaduct bridge that runs between Langfang and Qingxian, part of the Beijing–Shanghai High-Speed Railway. It is one of the longest bridges in the world with a total length of about 113.7 kilometers (70.6 mi). It was completed in 2010 and opened in 2011. At the time Guinness World Records recorded it as the second longest bridge in the world.

The design of the elevated track was chosen on the one hand to avoid numerous individual structures for crossing roads and railways, and on the other to shorten the construction period. In addition, the railway line requires less land area in this design: a railway embankment requires 28.4 hectares per routed kilometer, the bridge but only 10.9 ha, less than half the area.

The bridge consists of 32 m long box girders weighing 860 tons each. These girders were created in two workplaces along the bridge, brought to the installation site on the bridge section already installed, and then placed on the piers by a special crane.

== See also ==
- List of longest bridges
