= Rollemberg–Vuolo Road–Railway Bridge =

Bridge between Mato Grosso do Sul and São Paulo State

Rollemberg–Vuolo Road–Railway Bridge Ponte Rodoferroviária Rollemberg–Vuolo
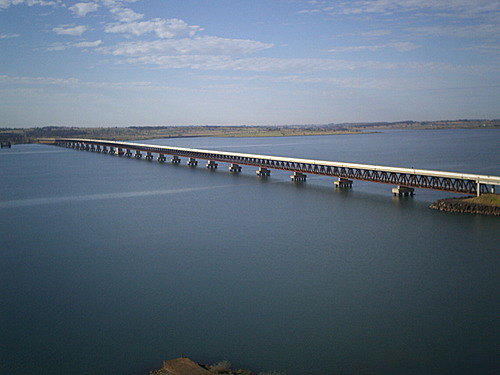
- Coordinates: 20°06′19″S 51°0′30″W
- Carries: all land vehicles (including trains)
- Crosses: Paraná River
- Locale: Mato Grosso do Sul-São Paulo State line

Characteristics
- Design: double-decker
- Total length: 3.7 kilometres (2.3 mi)

History
- Inaugurated: 1998

Rodoferroviária Rollemberg-Vuolo Bridge

The Rollemberg–Vuolo Road–Railway Bridge (in Portuguese, Ponte Rodoferroviária Rollemberg-Vuolo) is a double-decker bridge (road on the upper level and railway track at the lower level) over the Parana River, between the states of Mato Grosso do Sul and São Paulo in Brazil.

The bridge was inaugurated in 1998 and connects the roads SP-320 and MS-316. It has 3.7 kilometres (2.3 mi) of length. Its name pays homage to Brazilian deputy Roberto Rollemberg and to senator Vicente Emílio Vuolo, for their strong support to the construction of the bridge.

== See also ==
- List of road-rail bridges
