= Reserve Logistics Support Brigade of Hebei =

Chinese military unit

Reserve Division of Langfang (1984–1985); Reserve Infantry Division of Langfang (1985–1998); Reserve Logistics Support Brigade of Hebei (1998–present)
- Active: October 1984 – present
- Country: China
- Branch: People's Liberation Army
- Role: Infantry
- Size: Division
- Part of: Hebei Provincial Military District
- Garrison/HQ: Langfang, Hebei

The Reserve Logistics Support Brigade of Hebei (Chinese: 河北陆军预备役后勤保障旅), originally activated as the Reserve Division of Langfang (Chinese: 廊坊陆军预备役师) in October 1984, at Langfang, Hebei is a reserve infantry formation of the People's Liberation Army.

The division was composed of three infantry regiments and one artillery regiment. In November 1985, the division was redesignated as the Reserve Infantry Division of Langfang (Chinese: 廊坊陆军预备役步兵师).

The division was then composed of:

- 1st Infantry Regiment - Gu'an
- 2nd Infantry Regiment - Yongqing
- 3rd Infantry Regiment - Ba County
- Artillery Regiment

In December 1998, the division was reorganized as the Reserve Logistics Support Brigade of Hebei.
