= Ba Prefecture =

Ba Prefecture may refer to:

- Bā Prefecture (巴州), a prefecture between the 6th and 20th centuries in modern Sichuan, China
- Bà Prefecture (霸州), a prefecture between the 10th and 20th centuries in modern Hebei, China

== See also ==
- Bayingolin Mongol Autonomous Prefecture, a prefecture in Xinjiang, China, sometimes abbreviated as Ba Prefecture
- Bazhou (disambiguation)
- Ba (disambiguation)
