= Bà Prefecture =

Historical administrative division in Hebei, China

Bazhou or Ba Prefecture (霸州) was a zhou (prefecture) in imperial China in modern Bazhou City, Hebei, China. It existed (intermittently) from 959 to 1913.

The modern city of Bazhou, created in 1990, retains its name.

== Geography ==
The administrative region of Ba Prefecture in Later Zhou is in modern Langfang, Hebei on its western border with Tianjin. It probably includes parts of modern:

- Bazhou City
- Wen'an County
- Dacheng County
