= Pingshu, Hebei =

Pingshu 平舒镇
- Town
- Location in Hebei
- Coordinates: 38°41′36″N 116°38′5″E
- Country: People's Republic of China
- Province: Hebei
- Prefecture-level city: Langfang
- County: Dacheng County
- Time zone: UTC+8 (China Standard)

Pingshu (Chinese: 平舒; pinyin: Píngshū) is a town in Dacheng County, in Hebei province, China. As of 2020, it has 12 residential neighborhoods and 46 villages under its administration.

Residential neighborhoods

- Dongsheng (东盛)
- Chengsheng (程盛)
- Gongjiaoli (公交里)
- Chenxingli (晨星里)
- Chaoyangli (朝阳里)
- Donghuan (东环)
- Hepingli (和平里)
- Xiangheli (祥和里)
- Nanhuan (南环)
- Yijing (怡景)
- Jinbaodong Road (津保东路)
- Jinyuyuan (金玉源)

Villages

- Dongguan Village (东关村)
- Beiguan Village (北关村)
- Xiguan Village (西关村)
- Nanguan Village (南关村)
- Dongwangxiang Village (东王祥村)
- Xiwangxiang Village (西王祥村)
- Jiaozhuang Village (缴庄村)
- Wangzhuang Village (王庄村)
- Tianzhuang Village (田庄村)
- Xichenzhuang Village (西陈庄村)
- Renchang Village (任场村)
- Songzhuang Village (宋庄村)
- Bianzhuang Village (卞庄村)
- Erguyuan Village (二姑院村)
- Dongchenzhuang Village (东陈庄村)
- Dongcuizhuang Village (东崔庄村)
- Jiazhuang Village (贾庄村)
- Wangpeizhuang Village (王裴庄村)
- Zhengpeizhuang Village (郑裴庄村)
- Zhangpeizhuang Village (张裴庄村)
- Daipeizhuang Village (戴裴庄村)
- Hanpeizhuang Village (韩裴庄村)
- Bafang Village (八方村)
- Dalibei Village (大里北村)
- Sunlibei Village (孙里北村)
- Liulibei Village (刘里北村)
- Libeidian Village (里北店村)
- Weilibei Village (魏里北村)
- Beilizhuang Village (北李庄村)
- Datongzi Village (大童子村)
- Xiaotongzi Village (小童子村)
- Liangdouzhuang Village (亮斗庄村)
- Wufang Village (五方村)
- Caiyuan Village (菜园村)
- Dongjinbei Village (东近北村)
- Xijinbei Village (西近北村)
- Youfang Village (油房村)
- Beiwangxiang Village (北王祥村)
- Yazhuang Village (牙庄村)
- Daxianglian Village (大祥连村)
- Xiaoxianglian Village (小祥连村)
- Xingzhuang Village (兴庄村)
- Dawangdu Village (大王都村)
- Xiaowangdu Village (小王都村)
- Wen Village (温村)
- Xingyuan Village (杏园村)
