= Bieguzhuang =

Bieguzhuang 别古庄镇
- Town
- Biégǔzhuāng Zhèn
- Location in Hebei Location in China
- Coordinates: 39°18′52″N 116°39′53″E
- Country: People's Republic of China
- Province: Hebei
- Prefecture-level city: Langfang
- County: Yongqing

Area
  - Total: 79.77 km^{2} (30.80 sq mi)

Population (2010)
  - Total: 24,591
  - Density: 308.3/km^{2} (798/sq mi)
- Time zone: UTC+8 (China Standard)

Bieguzhuang (Chinese: 别古庄镇; pinyin: Biégǔzhuāng Zhèn) is a town located in Yongqing County, Langfang, Hebei, China. According to the 2010 census, Bieguzhuang had a population of 24,591, including 12,532 males and 12,059 females. The population was distributed as follows: 3,257 people aged under 14, 18,948 people aged between 15 and 64, and 2,386 people aged over 65.

== See also ==
- List of township-level divisions of Hebei
