= Yongqing County =

Yongqing County 永清县 Yungtsing
- County
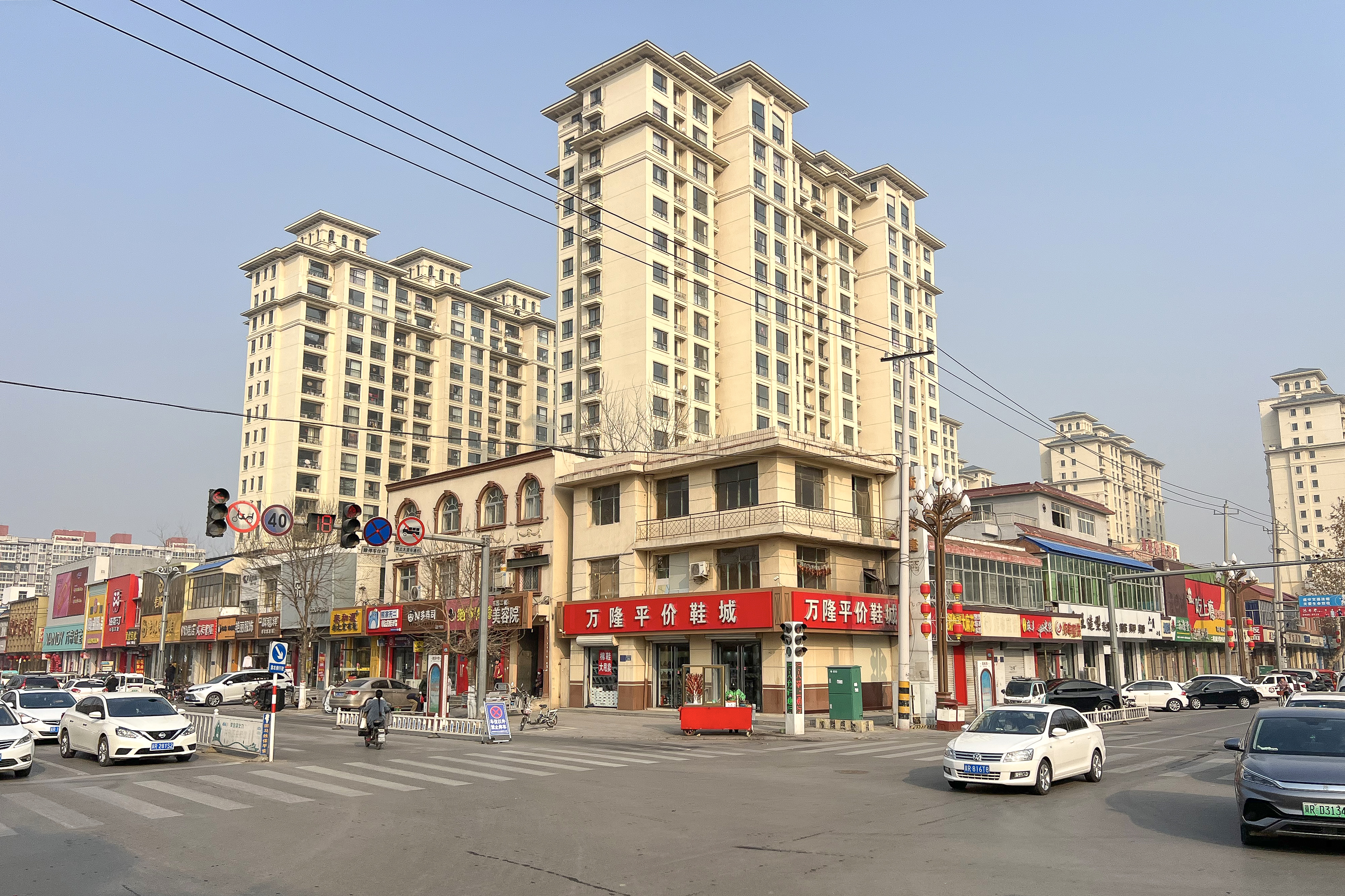

- Location in Hebei
- Coordinates (County seat): 39°19′N 116°30′E
- Country: People's Republic of China
- Province: Hebei
- Prefecture-level city: Langfang
- Seat: Yongqingxian Subdistrict (永清县街道)

Area
  - Total: 774 km^{2} (299 sq mi)
- Elevation: 15 m (49 ft)

Population
  - Total: 382,000
  - Density: 494/km^{2} (1,280/sq mi)
- Time zone: UTC+8 (China Standard)
- Postal code: 065600
- Website: https://web.archive.org/web/20090521093205/http://www.yongqing.gov.cn/

Yongqing (Chinese: 永清; pinyin: Yǒngqīng; lit. 'forever clear') is a county in Hebei province, China. It is under the administration of the prefecture-level city of Langfang. It borders Guangyang District to the north, Anci District to the east, Bazhou to the south, and Gu'an County to the west. The county covers an area of 774 km^{2} (299 sq mi) and has a population of 382,000.

== History ==
=== Administrative divisions ===
The county administers 1 subdistrict, 5 towns and 5 townships.

The only subdistrict Yongqingxian Subdistrict (永清县街道)

Towns:

- Yongqing (永清镇), Hancun (韩村镇), Houyi (后奕镇), Bieguzhuang (别古庄镇), Lilancheng (里澜城镇)

Townships:

- Caojiawu Township (曹家务乡), Longhuzhuang Township (龙虎庄乡), Liujie Township (刘街乡), Sanshengkou Township (三圣口乡), Guanjiawu Hui Ethnic Township (管家务回族乡)

== Climate ==
Climate data for Yongqing, elevation 12 m (39 ft), (1991–2020 normals, extremes 1981–2010)
Month	Jan	Feb	Mar	Apr	May	Jun	Jul	Aug	Sep	Oct	Nov	Dec	Year
Record high °C (°F)	15.3 (59.5)	20.6 (69.1)	30.6 (87.1)	33.0 (91.4)	39.3 (102.7)	40.2 (104.4)	40.9 (105.6)	37.4 (99.3)	35.2 (95.4)	30.3 (86.5)	21.8 (71.2)	15.0 (59.0)	40.9 (105.6)
Mean daily maximum °C (°F)	2.2 (36.0)	6.3 (43.3)	13.5 (56.3)	21.4 (70.5)	27.5 (81.5)	31.2 (88.2)	32.0 (89.6)	30.7 (87.3)	26.7 (80.1)	19.7 (67.5)	10.4 (50.7)	3.5 (38.3)	18.8 (65.8)
Daily mean °C (°F)	−4.3 (24.3)	−0.4 (31.3)	6.8 (44.2)	14.6 (58.3)	20.7 (69.3)	24.9 (76.8)	26.8 (80.2)	25.3 (77.5)	20.1 (68.2)	12.7 (54.9)	4.1 (39.4)	−2.5 (27.5)	12.4 (54.3)
Mean daily minimum °C (°F)	−9.4 (15.1)	−5.7 (21.7)	0.8 (33.4)	8.1 (46.6)	14.0 (57.2)	19.2 (66.6)	22.3 (72.1)	21.0 (69.8)	14.8 (58.6)	7.1 (44.8)	−0.8 (30.6)	−7.1 (19.2)	7.0 (44.6)
Record low °C (°F)	−24.4 (−11.9)	−18.7 (−1.7)	−9.8 (14.4)	−3.6 (25.5)	2.3 (36.1)	8.2 (46.8)	15.2 (59.4)	12.6 (54.7)	2.5 (36.5)	−5.7 (21.7)	−12.0 (10.4)	−21.8 (−7.2)	−24.4 (−11.9)
Average precipitation mm (inches)	2.3 (0.09)	5.6 (0.22)	6.5 (0.26)	23.6 (0.93)	31.2 (1.23)	71.9 (2.83)	160.7 (6.33)	98.8 (3.89)	52.7 (2.07)	28.6 (1.13)	13.1 (0.52)	2.2 (0.09)	497.2 (19.59)
Average precipitation days (≥ 0.1 mm)	1.5	2.0	2.8	4.6	5.9	8.4	11.2	10.0	6.6	4.9	3.1	1.2	62.2
Average snowy days	2.1	2.0	0.8	0	0	0	0	0	0	0	1.4	2.0	8.3
Average relative humidity (%)	54	50	47	50	55	63	76	80	75	69	64	59	62
Mean monthly sunshine hours	147.4	156.6	201.6	217.3	241.5	197.4	182.2	191.2	186.5	177.7	145.0	143.1	2,187.5
Percentage possible sunshine	49	51	54	55	54	44	40	46	51	52	49	49	50
Source: China Meteorological Administration
