= Degui =

Degui 德归镇
- Town
- Déguī Zhèn
- Location in Hebei Location in China
- Coordinates: 38°53′50″N 116°41′07″E
- Country: People's Republic of China
- Province: Hebei
- Prefecture-level city: Langfang
- County: Wen'an

Area
  - Total: 108.6 km^{2} (41.9 sq mi)

Population (2010)
  - Total: 20,513
  - Density: 189/km^{2} (490/sq mi)
- Time zone: UTC+8 (China Standard)

Degui (Chinese: 德归镇; pinyin: Déguī Zhèn) is a town located in Wen'an County, Langfang, Hebei, China. According to the 2010 census, Degui had a population of 20,513, including 10,520 males and 9,993 females. The population was distributed as follows: 3,439 people aged under 14, 15,384 people aged between 15 and 64, and 1,690 people aged over 65.

== See also ==
- List of township-level divisions of Hebei
