= Chaheji Township =

Chaheji Township 岔河集乡
- Rural Township
- Chàhéjí Xiāng
- Location in Hebei Location in China
- Coordinates: 39°06′14″N 116°18′05″E
- Country: People's Republic of China
- Province: Hebei
- Prefecture-level city: Langfang
- County-level city: Bazhou

Area
  - Total: 79.10 km^{2} (30.54 sq mi)

Population (2010)
  - Total: 48,767
  - Density: 616.5/km^{2} (1,597/sq mi)
- Time zone: UTC+8 (China Standard)

Chaheji Township (Chinese: 岔河集乡; pinyin: Chàhéjí Xiāng) is a rural township located in Bazhou, Langfang, Hebei, China. According to the 2010 census, Chaheji Township had a population of 48,767, including 24,663 males and 24,104 females. The population was distributed as follows: 8,102 people aged under 14, 36,563 people aged between 15 and 64, and 4,102 people aged over 65.

== See also ==
- List of township-level divisions of Hebei
