= Oriental University City =

Chinese university campus

Oriental University City (“OUC”; Chinese: 东方大学城, Dōngfāng dàxuéchéng), founded in 2000, is a university town located in the Langfang Development Zone in Langfang City, Hebei, China. The campus covers a land area of 3.31 million sq. meters and houses 14 leading universities and colleges with a population of over 36,000 students. Notable education institutions include Peking University Founder Technology College, Beijing University of Traditional Chinese Medicine Oriental Institute, and Beijing City College.

OUC is located between the cities of Beijing and Tianjin, about 50 km and 60 km away from Beijing and Tianjin respectively.
