= Niutuo =

Niutuo 牛驼镇
- Town

Chinese transcription(s)
  - Pinyin: Niútuó Zhèn
- Location of Niutuo in Hebei
- Coordinates: 39°15′42″N 116°20′31″E
- Country: China
- Province: Hebei
- Prefecture: Langfang
- County: Gu'an County

Area
  - Total: 69.88 km^{2} (26.98 sq mi)

Population (2018)
  - Total: 43,996
  - Density: 629.6/km^{2} (1,631/sq mi)
- Time zone: UTC+8 (China Standard Time)

Niutuo (simplified Chinese: 牛驼镇; traditional Chinese: 牛駝鎮; pinyin: Niútuó Zhèn) is a town situated in Gu'an County, Langfang, Hebei, China. Niutuo spans an area of 69.88 square kilometres (26.98 mi^{2}), and has a population of 43,996 as of 2018. The town administers 50 village-level divisions.

== See also ==
- List of township-level divisions of Hebei
