= Caojiawu Township =

Caojiawu Township 曹家务乡
- Rural Township
- Cáojiāwù Xiāng
- Location in Hebei Location in China
- Coordinates: 39°24′10″N 116°30′52″E
- Country: People's Republic of China
- Province: Hebei
- Prefecture-level city: Langfang
- County: Yongqing

Area
  - Total: 79.15 km^{2} (30.56 sq mi)

Population (2010)
  - Total: 24,173
  - Density: 305.4/km^{2} (791/sq mi)
- Time zone: UTC+8 (China Standard)

Caojiawu Township (Chinese: 曹家务乡; pinyin: Cáojiāwù Xiāng) is a rural township located in Yongqing County, Langfang, Hebei, China. According to the 2010 census, Caojiawu Township had a population of 24,173, including 12,339 males and 11,834 females. The population was distributed as follows: 4,038 people aged under 14, 17,903 people aged between 15 and 64, and 2,232 people aged over 65.

== See also ==
- List of township-level divisions of Hebei
