= YQG =

YQG may refer to:

- Windsor International Airport (IATA: YQG), an airport in Ontario, Canada
- Yongqing County (Division code: YQG), a county in Hebei province, China
