= Gu'an Town =

Gu'an Town 固安镇
- Town
- Location in Hebei
- Coordinates: 39°26′30″N 116°18′14″E
- Country: People's Republic of China
- Province: Hebei
- Prefecture-level city: Langfang
- County: Gu'an
- Village-level divisions: 8 residential communities 103 villages

Area
  - Total: 26 km^{2} (10 sq mi)
- Elevation: 28 m (92 ft)

Population
  - Total: 10,678
  - Density: 410/km^{2} (1,100/sq mi)
- Time zone: UTC+8 (China Standard)
- Postal code: 065500
- Area code: 0316

Gu'an Town (simplified Chinese: 固安镇; traditional Chinese: 固安鎮; pinyin: Gù'ān Zhèn) is the seat of Gu'an County in central Hebei province, located just south of the border with Beijing. As of 2011, it has 8 residential communities (居委会) and 103 villages under its administration. Access to central parts of Beijing is provided by G45 Daqing–Guangzhou Expressway and China National Highway 106.

== See also ==
- List of township-level divisions of Hebei
