= Dashangtun =

Dashangtun 大尚屯镇
- Town
- Dàshàngtún Zhèn
- Location in Hebei Location in China
- Coordinates: 38°41′05″N 116°29′28″E
- Country: People's Republic of China
- Province: Hebei
- Prefecture-level city: Langfang
- County: Dacheng

Area
  - Total: 114.9 km^{2} (44.4 sq mi)

Population (2010)
  - Total: 64,671
  - Density: 562.9/km^{2} (1,458/sq mi)
- Time zone: UTC+8 (China Standard)

Dashangtun (Chinese: 大尚屯镇; pinyin: Dàshàngtún Zhèn) is a town located in Dacheng County, Langfang, Hebei, China. According to the 2010 census, Dashangtun had a population of 64,671, including 33,306 males and 31,365 females. The population was distributed as follows: 13,460 people aged under 14, 45,858 people aged between 15 and 64, and 5,353 people aged over 65.

== See also ==
- List of township-level divisions of Hebei
