= Beiwei =

Beiwei (北魏) may refer to:

- Northern Wei (386–535), a dynasty in North China during the Northern and Southern Dynasties period
- Beiwei Township, a township in Dacheng County, Hebei, China
