= Houyi (disambiguation) =

Houyi or Hou Yi is a mythological Chinese archer.

Houyi may also refer to:

- Hyperolius houyi, frog in the family Hyperoliidae
- Bicyclus angulosa or Mycalesis houyi, butterfly in the family Nymphalidae
- Houyi, Hebei, town in Yongqing County, Hebei, China
- Houyi (後驛里), West District, Chiayi, Taiwan
- Houyi metro station, Kaohsiung Metro, Taiwan
