= Meihua Group =

Chinese company

Meihua Group (Chinese: 梅花集团) is a premier global supplier of amino acid nutrition and wellness solutions.

== History ==
Established in 2002 and headquartered in Lhasa, Tibet Autonomous Region, Meihua Group finalized its shareholding reform in 2009, by securing listing qualifications via the proposed shell acquisition of Tibet Wuzhou Mingzhu. It was listed on the Shanghai Stock Exchange at the end of 2010, with its office situated in Langfang, Hebei Province. In March 2011, the stock abbreviation was altered from Wuzhou Mingzhu to Meihua Group. It is among the firms with the most extensive range of amino acids and the highest manufacturing capacity in China.

In 2015, Meihua Group generated a business income of 13 billion yuan, employing a total of 15,000 individuals, and the company has a diversified presence across Hebei, Inner Mongolia, Xinjiang, Shanxi, and other regions. In 2022, Animal Nutrition Amino Acids constituted 53% of Meihua Group's total revenue and emerged as the company's most rapidly expanding business area, exhibiting a growth rate of 26.2%.
