= Guan County =

Guan County or Guanxian may refer to the following places in China:

- Guan County, Shandong (冠县)
- Gu'an County (固安县), Hebei
- Dujiangyan City, formerly Guan County (灌县), Sichuan
