= Gu'an railway station =

Railway station in Langfang, China

Gu'an 固安
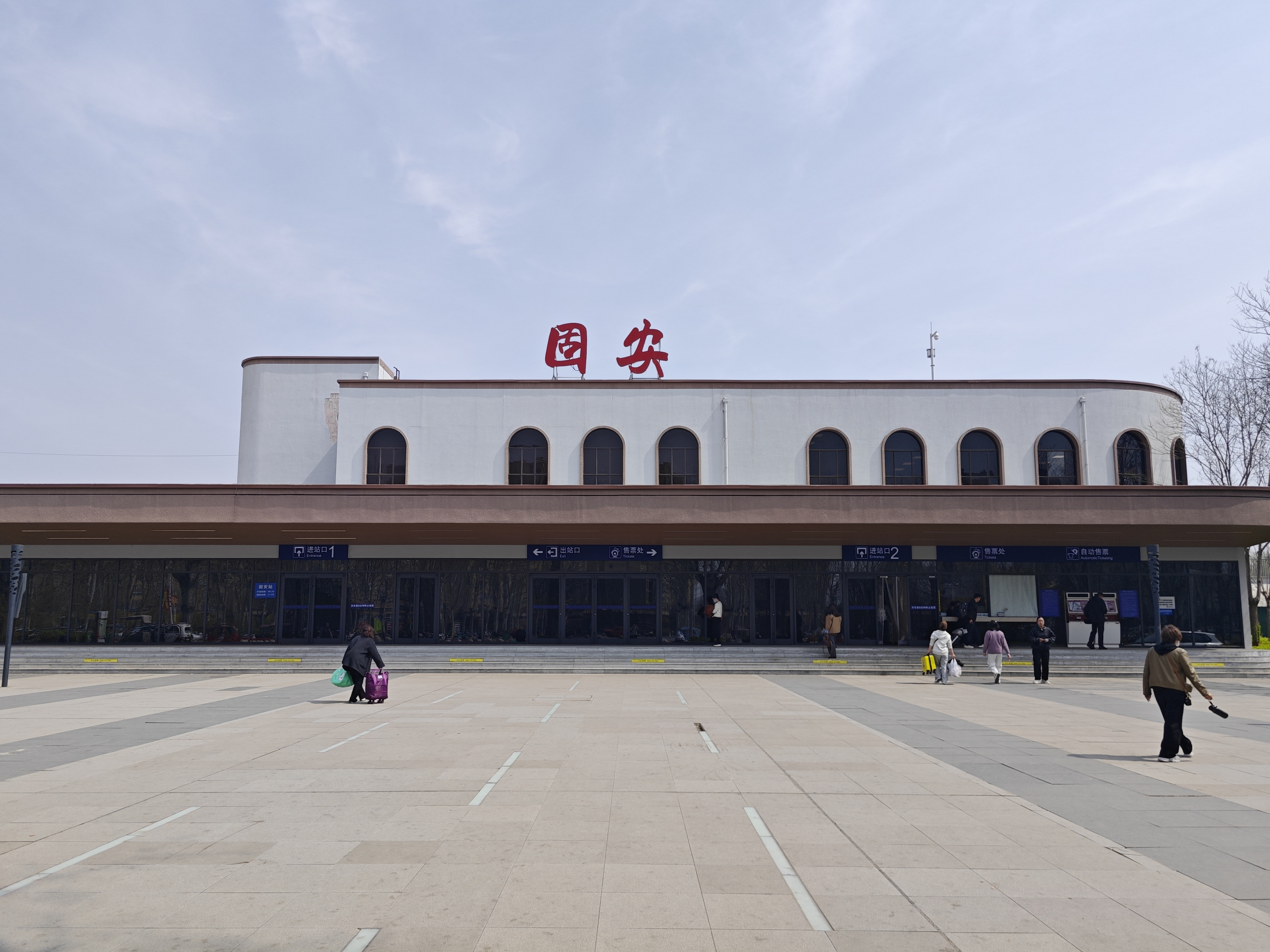

General information
- Location: Gu'an County, Langfang, Hebei; China
- Coordinates: 39°25′26.5″N 116°19′05″E
- Line: Beijing–Kowloon railway
Location

Gu'an railway station (Chinese: 固安站; pinyin: Gù'ān zhàn) is a railway station in Gu'an County, Langfang, Hebei, China. It is an intermediate stop on the Beijing–Kowloon railway.

On 28 May 2023, the station was reopened to passengers as two daily trains were introduced between Gu'an and Beijing Fengtai railway station.

== See also ==
- Gu'an East railway station

Preceding station	China Railway	Following station
Huangcun towards Beijing West	Beijing–Kowloon railway	Bazhou towards Hung Hom
