= Daliuhe =

Daliuhe 大柳河镇
- Town
- Dàliŭhé Zhèn
- Location in Hebei Location in China
- Coordinates: 38°57′40″N 116°32′29″E
- Country: People's Republic of China
- Province: Hebei
- Prefecture-level city: Langfang
- County: Wen'an

Area
  - Total: 92.88 km^{2} (35.86 sq mi)

Population (2010)
  - Total: 38,760
  - Density: 417.3/km^{2} (1,081/sq mi)
- Time zone: UTC+8 (China Standard)

Daliuhe (Chinese: 大柳河镇; pinyin: Dàliŭhé Zhèn) is a town located in Wen'an County, Langfang, Hebei, China. According to the 2010 census, Daliuhe had a population of 38,760, including 20,301 males and 18,459 females. The population was distributed as follows: 6,375 people aged under 14, 29,814 people aged between 15 and 64, and 2,571 people aged over 65.

== See also ==
- List of township-level divisions of Hebei
