= LJP =

LJP may refer to:

- Langfang railway station, China Railway telegraph code LJP
- Lok Janshakti Party, an Indian political party
- Liam James Payne (born 1993), an English singer
- Lijo Jose Pellissery (born 1978), an Indian filmmaker
