= Laofa railway station =

Railway station in Langfang, China

Laofa 落垡
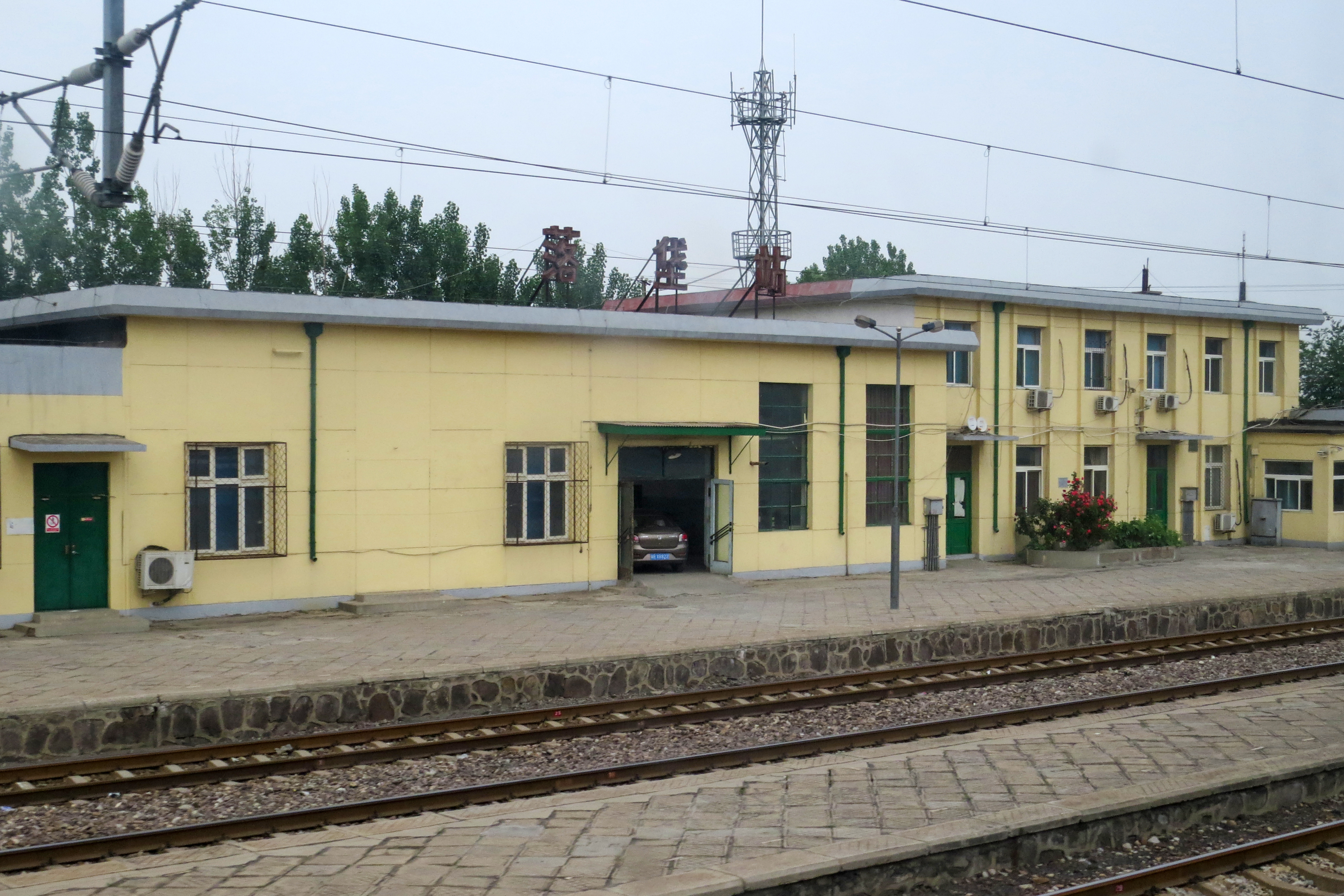
- Station building in 2016

General information
- Location: Laofa, Anci District, Langfang, Hebei
- Coordinates: 39.439121°N 116.838035°E
- Operated by: China Railway
- Line(s): Beijing–Shanghai railway

Other information
- Station code: 10076 (TMIS); LOP (telegram); LFA (pinyin code)

Services
Preceding station	China Railway	Following station
Guangyang towards Beijing	Beijing–Shanghai railway	Douzhangzhuang towards Shanghai

Laofa railway station (落垡站) is a fourth-class station at 87 km on Beijing–Shanghai railway. The station was built in 1895. It is located in Laofa, Anci District, Langfang city, Hebei province, China.
