= Daliuzhen =

Daliuzhen 大留镇镇
- Town
- Dàliúzhèn Zhèn
- Location in Hebei Location in China
- Coordinates: 38°50′58″N 116°19′39″E
- Country: People's Republic of China
- Province: Hebei
- Prefecture-level city: Langfang
- County: Wen'an

Area
  - Total: 72.04 km^{2} (27.81 sq mi)

Population (2010)
  - Total: 39,839
  - Density: 553/km^{2} (1,430/sq mi)
- Time zone: UTC+8 (China Standard)

Daliuzhen (Chinese: 大留镇镇; pinyin: Dàliúzhèn Zhèn) is a town located in Wen'an County, Langfang, Hebei, China. According to the 2010 census, Daliuzhen had a population of 39,839, including 20,499 males and 19,340 females. The population was distributed as follows: 6,633 people aged under 14, 30,104 people aged between 15 and 64, and 3,102 people aged over 65.

== See also ==
- List of township-level divisions of Hebei
