= Liugezhuang =

Liúgézhuāng (留格庄) may refer to:

- Liugezhuang, Dacheng County, town in Dacheng County, Hebei, China
- Liugezhuang, Haiyang, town in Haiyang, Shandong, China
