= Lilancheng =

Lilancheng 里澜城镇
- Town
- Location in Hebei
- Coordinates: 39°12′04″N 116°43′01″E
- Country: People's Republic of China
- Province: Hebei
- Prefecture-level city: Langfang
- County: Yongqing
- Village-level divisions: 30 villages
- Elevation: 11 m (36 ft)
- Time zone: UTC+8 (China Standard)
- Area code: 0316

Lilancheng (simplified Chinese: 里澜城; traditional Chinese: 里瀾城; pinyin: Lǐlánchéng) is a town of Yongqing County in central Hebei province, China, located 23 kilometres (14 mi) southeast of the county seat. As of 2011, it has 30 villages under its administration.

== See also ==
- List of township-level divisions of Hebei
