= Bazhou =

Bazhou may refer to:

- Bazhou, Hebei (霸州市), subdivision of Langfang, China named after the historical prefecture
- Bazhou District (巴州区) in Bazhong, Sichuan, China named after the historical prefecture

== Towns ==
- Bazhou Town, Hebei (霸州镇; zh), subdivision of Bazhou, Hebei, China
- Bazhou Town, Sichuan (巴州镇; zh), subdivision of Bazhou District, China
- Bazhou, Qinghai (巴州镇; zh), a town in Minhe Hui and Tu Autonomous County, Qinghai, China

== Prefectures ==
- Ba Prefecture (Sichuan), a prefecture between the 6th and 20th centuries in modern Sichuan, China
- Ba Prefecture (Hebei), a prefecture between the 10th and 20th centuries in modern Hebei, China
- Bayingolin Mongol Autonomous Prefecture, Xinjiang, China sometimes abbreviated as Bazhou (巴州) in Chinese

== See also ==
- Ba (disambiguation)
