= Houyi, Hebei =

Houyi 后奕镇
- Town
- Location in Hebei
- Coordinates: 39°13′25″N 116°33′32″E
- Country: People's Republic of China
- Province: Hebei
- Prefecture-level city: Langfang
- County: Yongqing County
- Time zone: UTC+8 (China Standard)

Houyi (Chinese: 后奕; pinyin: Hòuyì) is a town under the administration of Yongqing County, Hebei, China. As of 2023, it administers the following nineteen villages:

- Houyi Village
- Nanmen Village (南门村)
- Baiyankou Village (白雁口村)
- Jianguzhuang Village (坚固庄村)
- Shigezhuang Village (石各庄村)
- Lifengxian Village (李奉先村)
- Xiaoliuzhuang Village (小刘庄村)
- Zhengjiayao Village (郑家窑村)
- Yaoke Village (姚窠村)
- Dengjiawu Village (邓家务村)
- Xiaohuang Village (小黄村)
- Hangezhuang Village (韩各庄村)
- Dongpanggezhuang Village (东庞各庄村)
- Xipanggezhuang Village (西庞各庄村)
- Dongxiangzhuang Village (董相庄村)
- Dongyihe Village (东义和村)
- Tuanjuzhuang Village (团聚庄村)
- Xinlizhangchang Village (辛立张场村)
- Nanxinlizhuang Village (南辛立庄村)
