= Yangcun railway station =

Railway station in Wuqing, Tianjin, China

Coordinates: 39.3545°N 117.0650°E

Yangcun 杨村
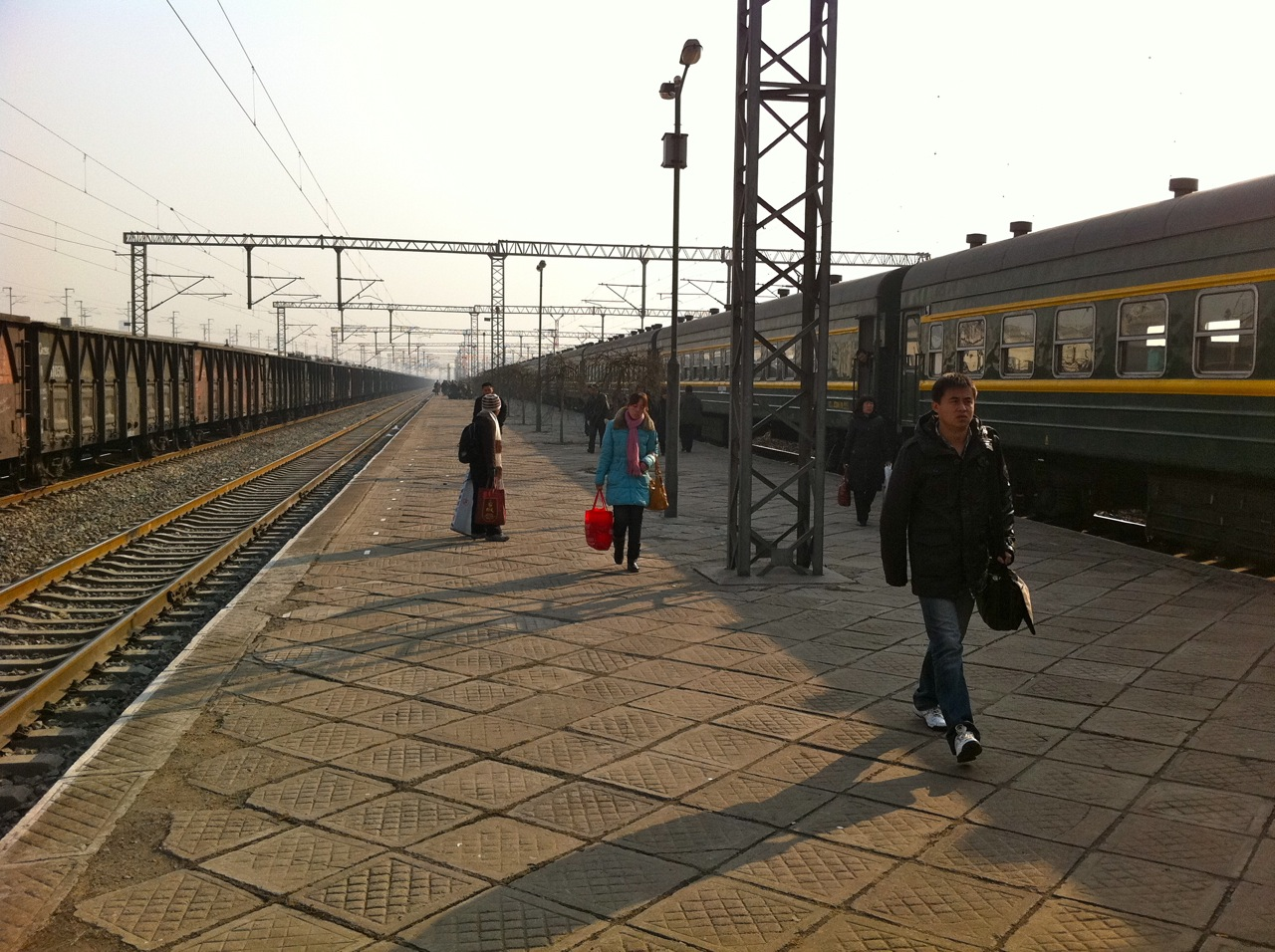
- Yangcun railway station platform

General information
- Location: Wuqing District, Tianjin; China
- Operator: Beijing Railway Bureau; China Railway Corporation
- Line: Beijing–Shanghai Railway

Other information
- Station code: TMIS: 10082; Telegraph: YBP; Pinyin: YCU

History
- Closed: 18 April 2025 (passenger service)

Services
Preceding station	China Railway	Following station
Douzhangzhuang towards Beijing	Beijing–Shanghai railway	Hangouzhen towards Shanghai
Location

Yangcun railway station was a railway station on the Beijing-Shanghai Railway in Wuqing District, Tianjin, China.

The station building was to the north of the platforms. The passenger service is closed on 18 April 2025, and still serve freight transport.

== See also ==
Yangcun Railway Station is 5 km away from Wuqing railway station on the Beijing-Tianjin Intercity Railway.
