= Anci, Langfang =

Anci 安次区 Antze
- District
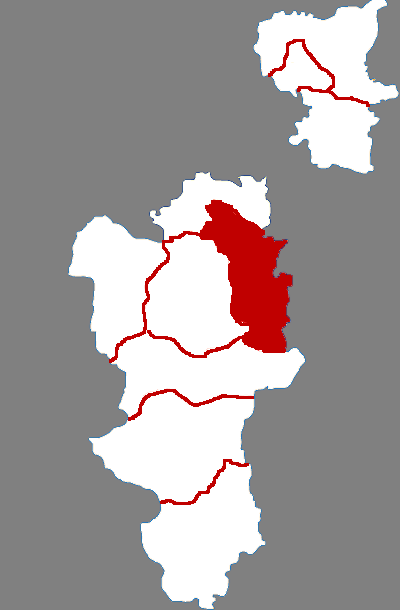
- Anci in Langfang

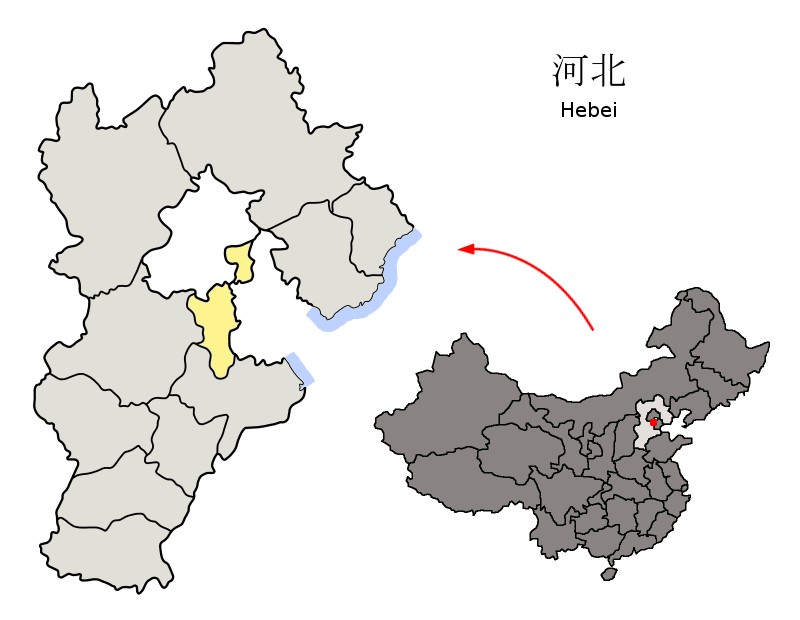
- Langfang in Hebei
- Coordinates: 39°31′14″N 116°42′11″E
- Country: China
- Province: Hebei
- Prefecture-level city: Langfang
- District seat: North Yinhe Road Subdistrict, Guangyang District

Area
  - Total: 595 km^{2} (230 sq mi)
- Elevation: 17 m (56 ft)

Population (2020 census)
  - Total: 479,826
  - Density: 806/km^{2} (2,090/sq mi)
- Time zone: UTC+8 (China Standard)
- Postal code: 065000
- Area code: 0316
- Website: anci.lf.gov.cn

Anci District (Chinese: 安次区; pinyin: Āncì Qū) is a district of Langfang, Hebei, China.

== Administrative divisions ==
The district comprises 3 subdistricts and 8 towns.

Subdistricts

- South Yinhe Road Subdistrict (银河南路街道), West Guangming Street Subdistrict (光明西道街道), Yonghua Street Subdistrict (永华道街道)

Towns

- Laofa (落垡镇), Matou (码头镇), Geyucheng (葛渔城镇), Donggugang (东沽港镇), Diaohetou (调河头镇), Beishijiawu (北史家务镇), Yangshuiwu (杨税务镇), Qiuzhuang (仇庄镇).

== Transport ==
- Langfang railway station
- Laofa railway station
- Anci railway station

== Culture ==
Geyucheng Zhonggehui (葛渔城重阁会) Folk dance. Usually there are two layers of actors. The lower level is composed of strong men who are good at dancing. The higher level is composed of children, acting as 'female horn'.

Others like, Folk Music, Dishili Kite (第什里风筝), Zhongfan (中幡).
