= Douzhangzhuang railway station =

Railway station in Tianjin, China

Coordinates: 39°23′47″N 116°56′37″E

Douzhangzhuang 豆张庄
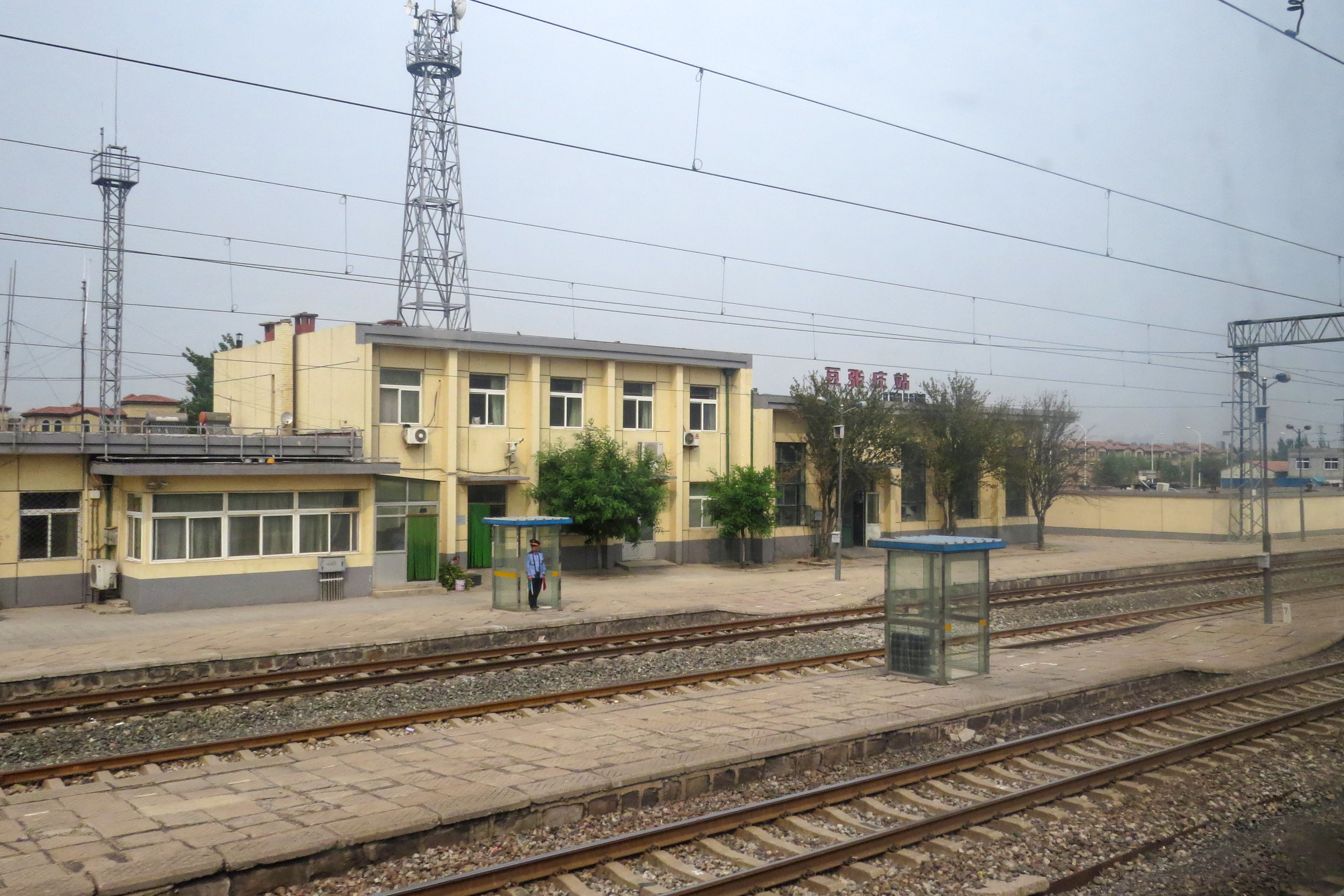
- Station building in May 2016

General information
- Location: Wuqing District, Tianjin
- Operator: China Railway
- Line: Beijing–Shanghai railway

Services
Preceding station	China Railway	Following station
Laofa towards Beijing	Beijing–Shanghai railway	Yangcun towards Shanghai
Location

Douzhangzhuang railway station (豆张庄站) is a fourth-class station at 97 km on Jingshan railway.

The station was built in 1907. It is located in Wuqing District, Tianjin.

The station was renamed 414 railway station in 1969 during the 10th anniversary of Mao Zedong's visit of Douzhangzhuang on April 14, 1959. It was renamed back on October 1, 1980.
