= Guangyang railway station =

Railway station in Guangyang District, Langfang, China

Guangyang 广阳
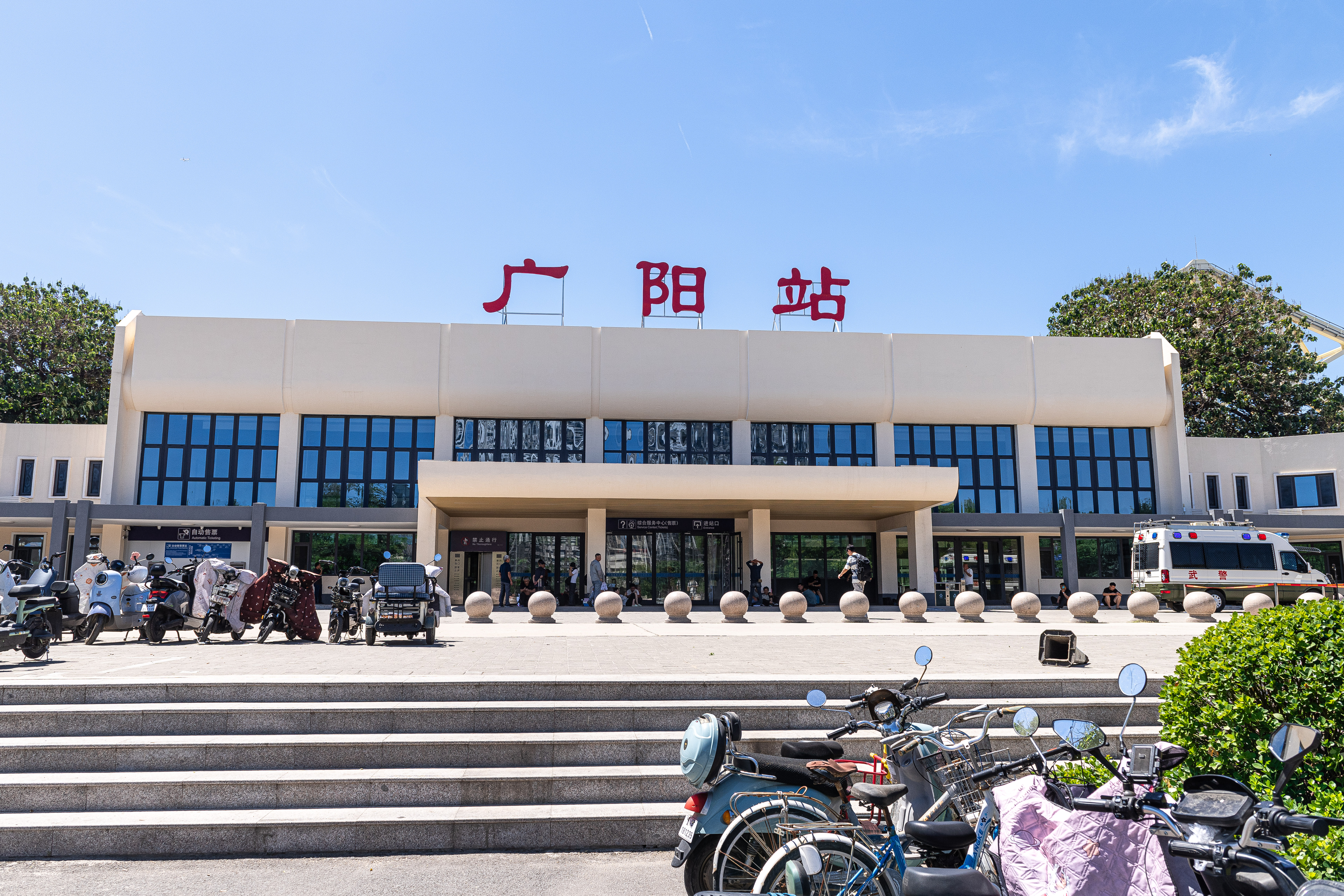

General information
- Location: Guangyang District, Langfang, Hebei; China
- Coordinates: 39°30′48″N 116°42′21″E
- Operator: China Railway Beijing Group; China Railway Corporation
- Line: Beijing–Shanghai railway

Other information
- Station code: 10073

History
- Opened: 1895; 1989 (Moved to current location)
- Former names: Langfang North

Services
Preceding station	China Railway	Following station
Wanzhuang towards Beijing	Beijing–Shanghai railway	Laofa towards Shanghai
Location
- Location within Hebei

Guangyang railway station (Chinese: 广阳站; pinyin: Guǎngyáng zhàn) is a railway station in Guangyang District, Langfang, Hebei. It is served by the conventional Beijing–Shanghai railway and is situated adjacent to Langfang railway station, which is served by high-speed trains. An underground passage links the two.

== Name ==
The station renamed from Langfang railway station to Langfang North railway station on June 1, 2011. It renamed from Langfang North railway station to Guangyang railway station on December 30, 2023.
