= Langfang railway station =

High-speed railway station in Anci District, Langfang, China

Langfang 廊坊
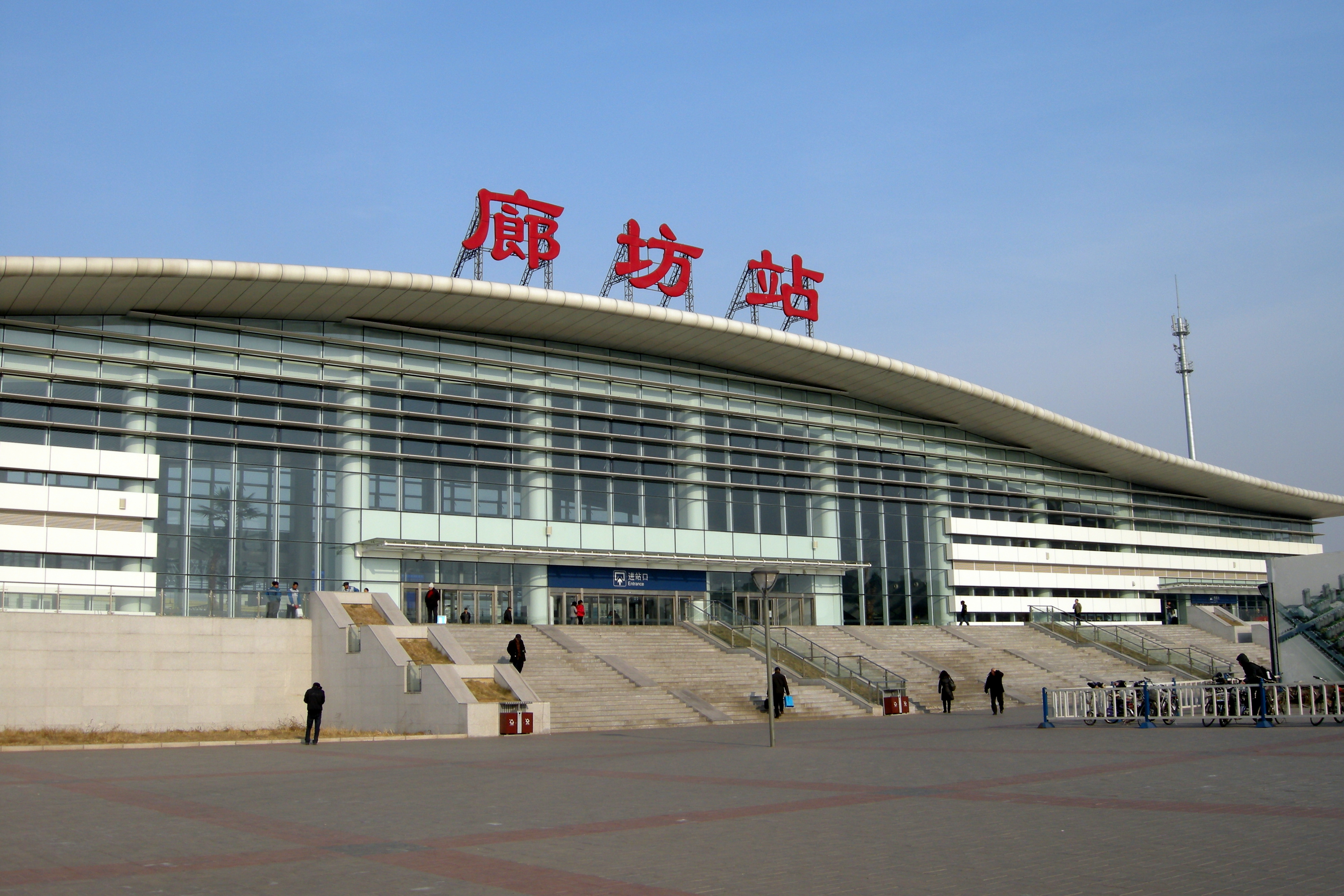

General information
- Location: Anci District, Langfang, Hebei; China
- Coordinates: 39°30′33″N 116°42′33″E
- Operator: China Railway Beijing Group; China Railway Corporation
- Line: Beijing–Shanghai High-Speed Railway

Other information
- Station code: TMIS code: 66800; Telegraph code: LJP; Pinyin code: LFA
- Classification: 2nd class station

History
- Opened: July 1, 2011
Location
- Location within Hebei

The Langfang railway station (Chinese: 廊坊站; pinyin: Lángfáng Zhàn) is a high-speed railway station in Anci District, Langfang, Hebei, situated between Beijing and Tianjin. It is served by the Beijing–Shanghai high-speed railway.

The railway is situated adjacent to Guangyang railway station which is served by conventional trains. An underground passage links the two.

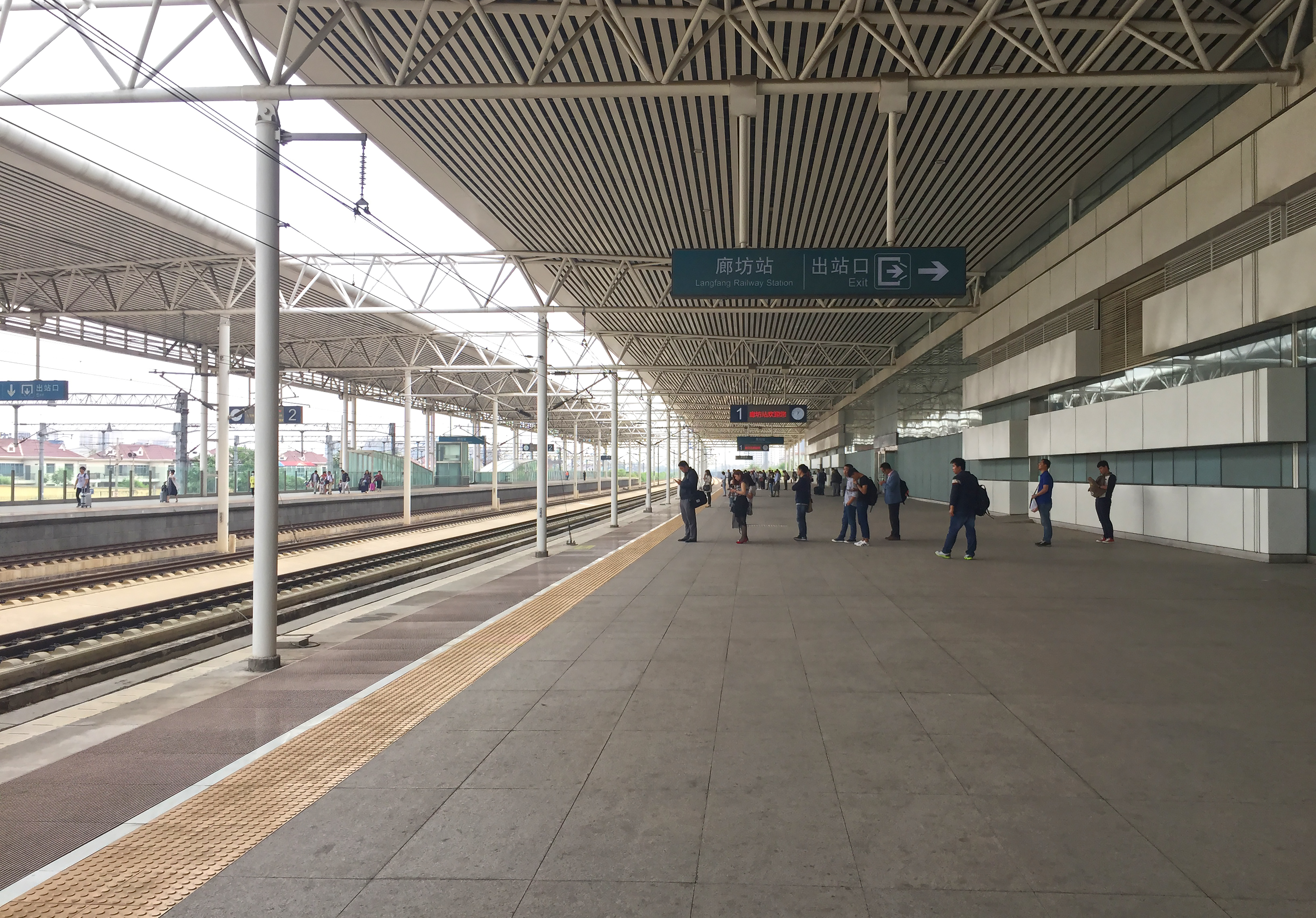
Platform 1 of Langfang railway station

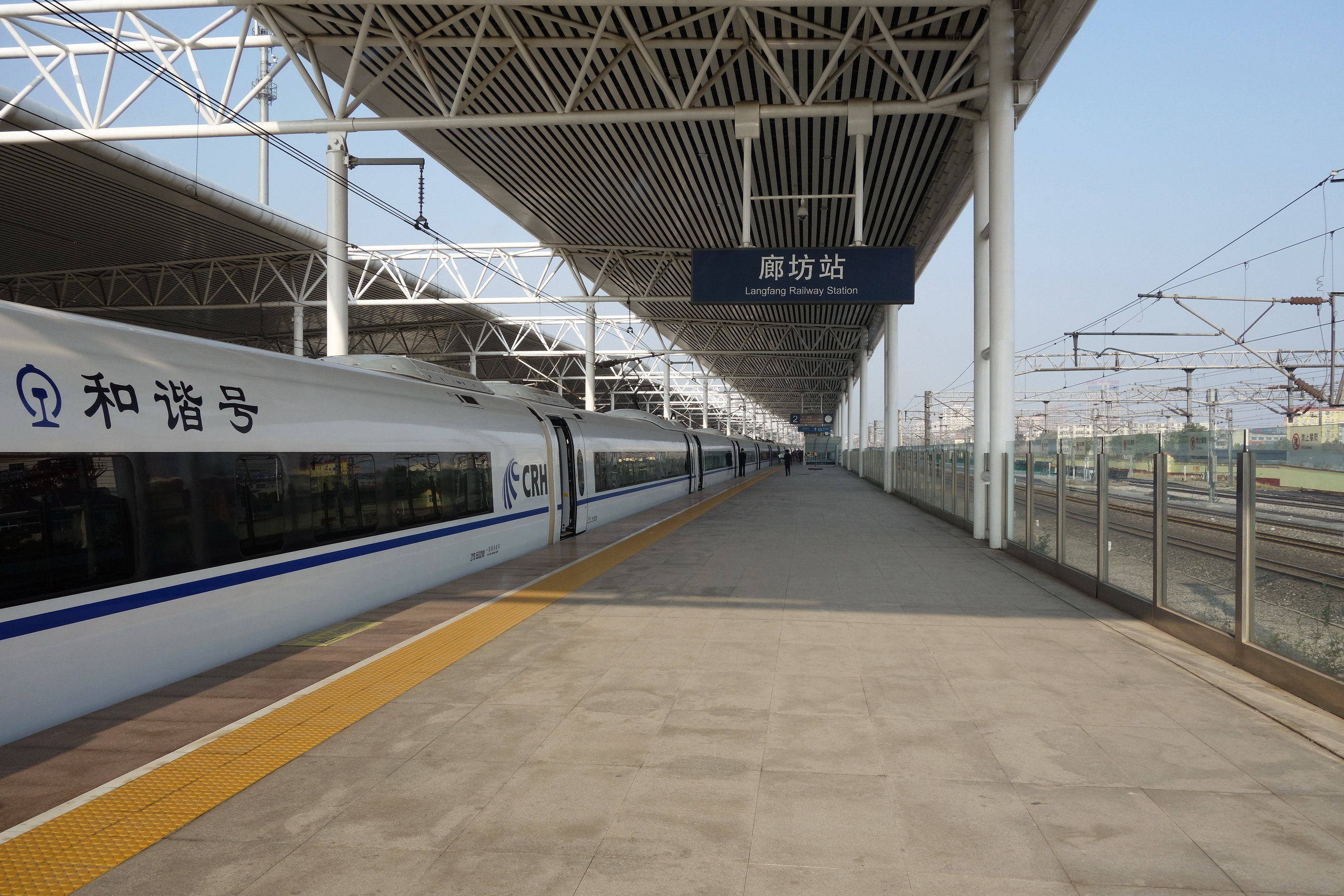
Langfang railway station platform

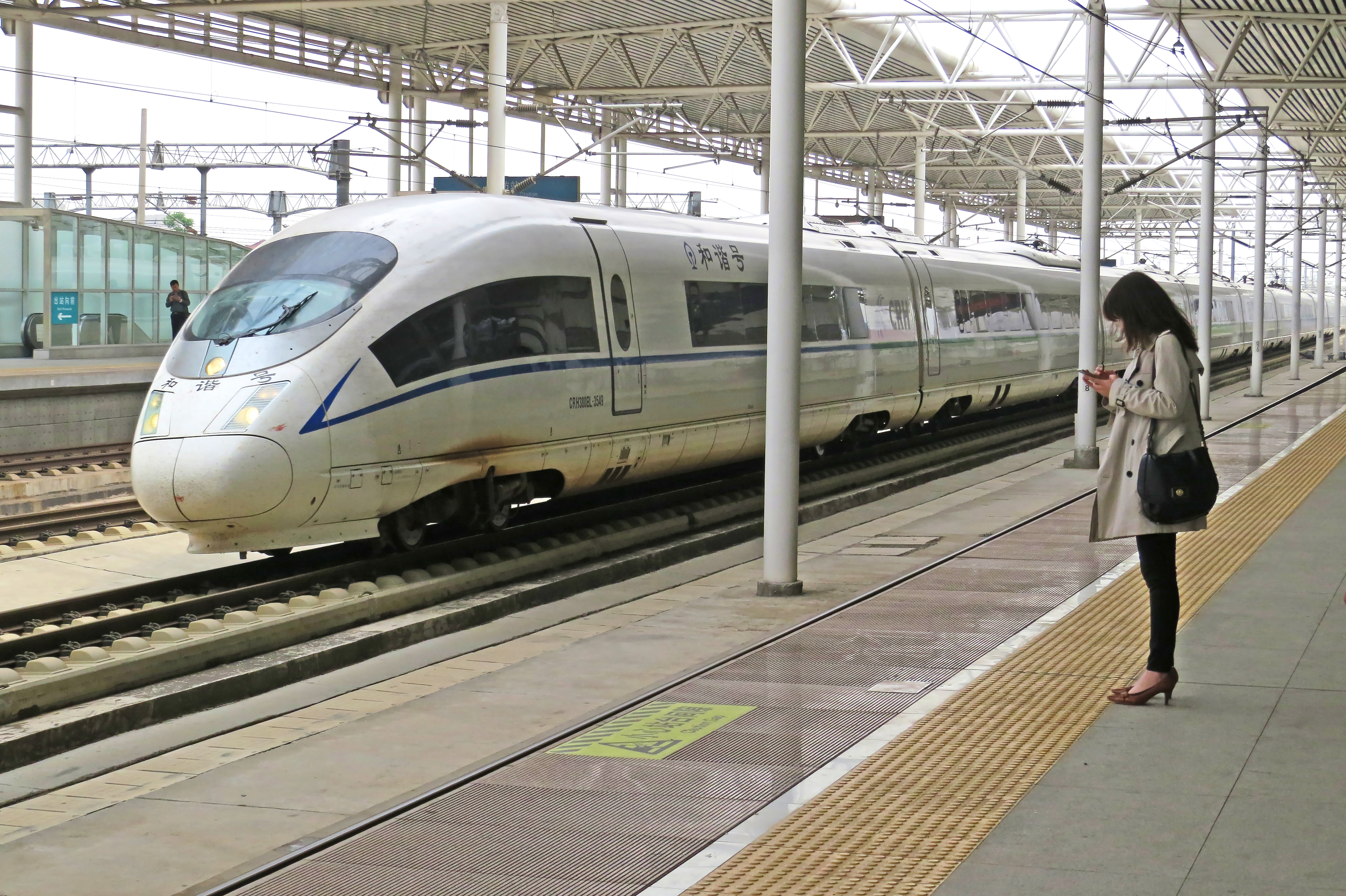
G102 Shanghai-Beijing train passing Langfang Station

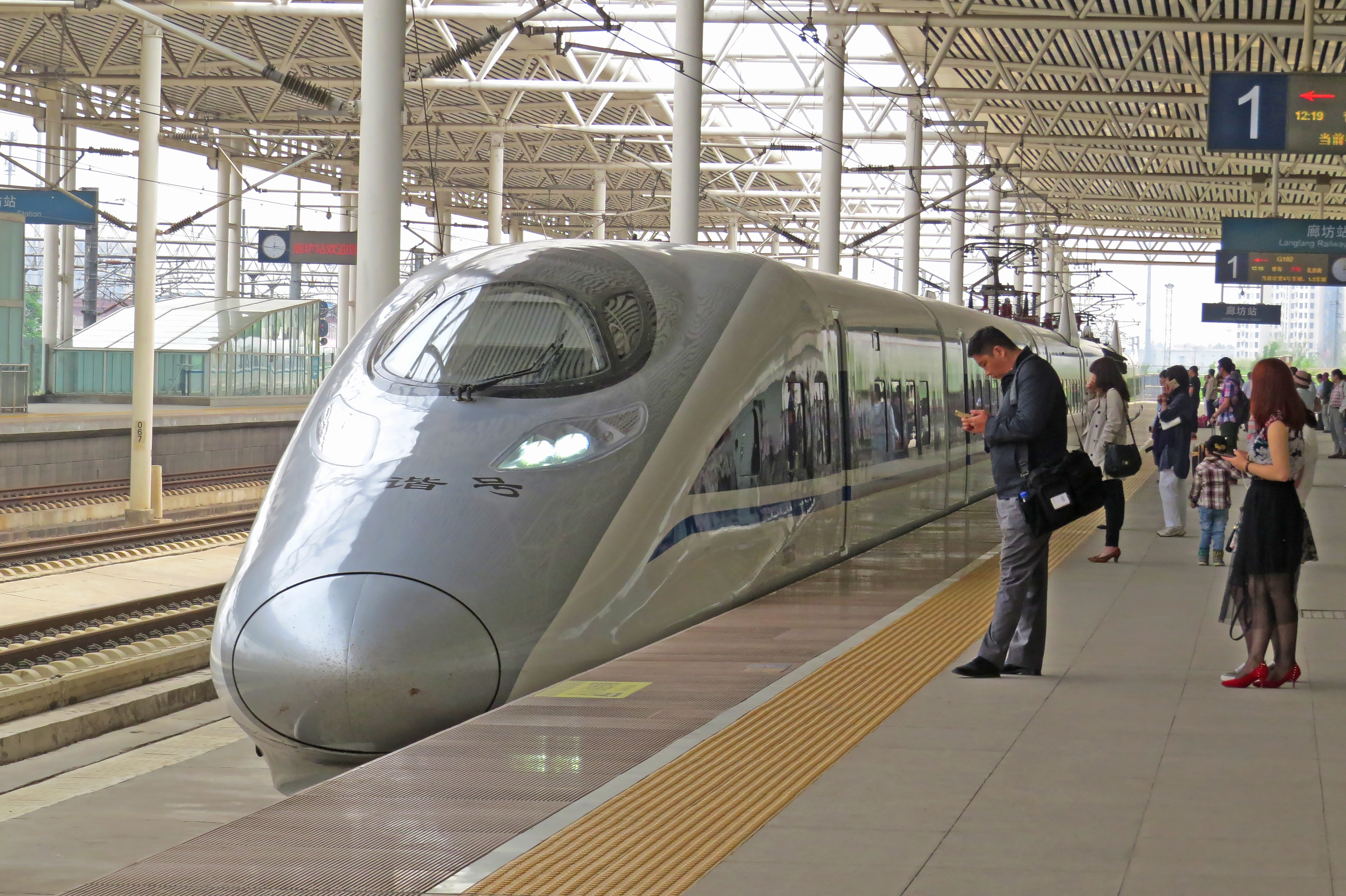
G182 Qingdao-Beijing train entering Langfang Station

Preceding station	China Railway High-speed	Following station
Beijing South Terminus	Beijing–Shanghai high-speed railway Part of the Beijing–Fuzhou high-speed railway	Tianjin South towards Shanghai Hongqiao
