= Peking University Founder Technology College =

- 北大方正软件职业技术学院
- Type: provincial
- Established: 2002
- Location: Beijing, China
- Campus: Urban
- Website: www.pfc.edu.cn

Chinese name
- Simplified Chinese: 北大方正软件职业技术学院
- Traditional Chinese: 北大方正軟件職業技術學院
Transcriptions
Standard Mandarin
- Hanyu Pinyin: Běidà Fāngzhèng Ruǎnjiàn Zhíyè Jìshù Xuéyuàn

Peking University Founder Technology College (北大方正软件职业技术学院) is a general vocational institution organized by the Beijing University Founder Group Corporation. The institution has national recognition of educational qualifications of full-time courses.
