= Wen'an County =

Wen'an County 文安县 Wenan
- County
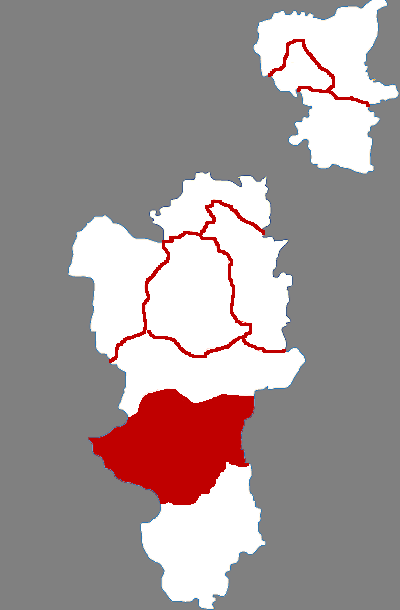
- Wen'an in Langfang

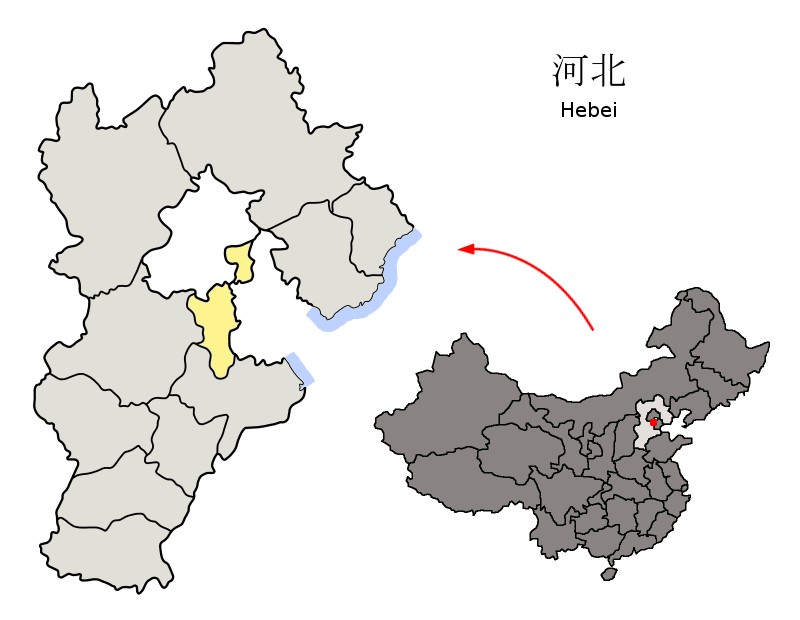
- Langfang in Hebei
- Coordinates: 38°52′23″N 116°27′29″E
- Country: People's Republic of China
- Province: Hebei
- Prefecture-level city: Langfang
- County seat: Wen'an Town (文安镇)

Area
  - Total: 980 km^{2} (380 sq mi)
- Elevation: 7 m (23 ft)

Population (2004)
  - Total: 460,000
  - Density: 470/km^{2} (1,200/sq mi)
- Time zone: UTC+8 (China Standard)
- Postal code: 065800
- Area code: 0316

Wen'an (Chinese: 文安; pinyin: Wén'ān) is a county in the central part of Hebei province, China, on the upper reaches of the Daqing River (大清河), a tributary of the Hai River, and bordering Tianjin to the east. It is under the administration of the prefecture-level city of Langfang, and, as of 2004, had a population of 460,000 residing in an area of 980 km^{2} (380 sq mi).

== Administrative divisions ==
The county administers 12 towns and one ethnic township.

Towns:

- Wen'an (文安镇)
- Xinzhen (新镇镇)
- Suqiao (苏桥镇)
- Daliuhe (大柳河镇)
- Zuogezhuang (左各庄镇)
- Tanli (滩里镇)
- Shigezhuang (史各庄镇)
- Zhaogezhuang (赵各庄镇)
- Xinglonggong (兴隆宫镇)
- Daliuzhen (大留镇镇)
- Sunshi (孙氏镇)
- Degui (德归镇)

The only township is Daweihe Hui and Manchu Ethnic Township (大围河回族满族乡)

== Climate ==
Climate data for Wen'an, elevation 4 m (13 ft), (1991–2020 normals, extremes 1981–2010)
Month	Jan	Feb	Mar	Apr	May	Jun	Jul	Aug	Sep	Oct	Nov	Dec	Year
Record high °C (°F)	15.9 (60.6)	21.0 (69.8)	30.7 (87.3)	33.8 (92.8)	38.9 (102.0)	40.6 (105.1)	41.9 (107.4)	38.4 (101.1)	35.4 (95.7)	31.3 (88.3)	23.4 (74.1)	15.2 (59.4)	41.9 (107.4)
Mean daily maximum °C (°F)	2.4 (36.3)	6.6 (43.9)	13.8 (56.8)	21.6 (70.9)	27.7 (81.9)	31.7 (89.1)	32.3 (90.1)	30.8 (87.4)	27.0 (80.6)	20.2 (68.4)	10.8 (51.4)	3.9 (39.0)	19.1 (66.3)
Daily mean °C (°F)	−3.5 (25.7)	0.2 (32.4)	7.2 (45.0)	14.9 (58.8)	21.2 (70.2)	25.6 (78.1)	27.3 (81.1)	25.9 (78.6)	21.0 (69.8)	13.8 (56.8)	5.0 (41.0)	−1.6 (29.1)	13.1 (55.5)
Mean daily minimum °C (°F)	−8.0 (17.6)	−4.7 (23.5)	1.6 (34.9)	8.9 (48.0)	15.0 (59.0)	20.0 (68.0)	22.9 (73.2)	21.9 (71.4)	16.2 (61.2)	8.7 (47.7)	0.6 (33.1)	−5.7 (21.7)	8.1 (46.6)
Record low °C (°F)	−18.5 (−1.3)	−16.5 (2.3)	−9.9 (14.2)	−2.6 (27.3)	5.0 (41.0)	10.3 (50.5)	16.3 (61.3)	14.5 (58.1)	5.7 (42.3)	−3.6 (25.5)	−10.6 (12.9)	−19.6 (−3.3)	−19.6 (−3.3)
Average precipitation mm (inches)	2.2 (0.09)	5.2 (0.20)	9.0 (0.35)	20.9 (0.82)	30.7 (1.21)	76.7 (3.02)	156.4 (6.16)	113.4 (4.46)	49.6 (1.95)	28.8 (1.13)	12.9 (0.51)	2.2 (0.09)	508 (19.99)
Average precipitation days (≥ 0.1 mm)	1.5	2.1	2.9	4.5	5.5	7.7	11.7	9.9	6.2	4.8	3.2	1.6	61.6
Average snowy days	2.1	2.1	0.8	0.1	0	0	0	0	0	0	1.3	2.1	8.5
Average relative humidity (%)	56	51	48	50	53	60	73	77	70	65	63	60	61
Mean monthly sunshine hours	184.0	193.4	245.9	265.0	291.3	261.0	236.7	236.1	230.4	214.8	173.3	172.2	2,704.1
Percentage possible sunshine	60	63	66	67	66	59	53	56	63	63	58	59	61
Source: China Meteorological Administration
