= Guangyang, Langfang =

Guangyang 广阳区
- District
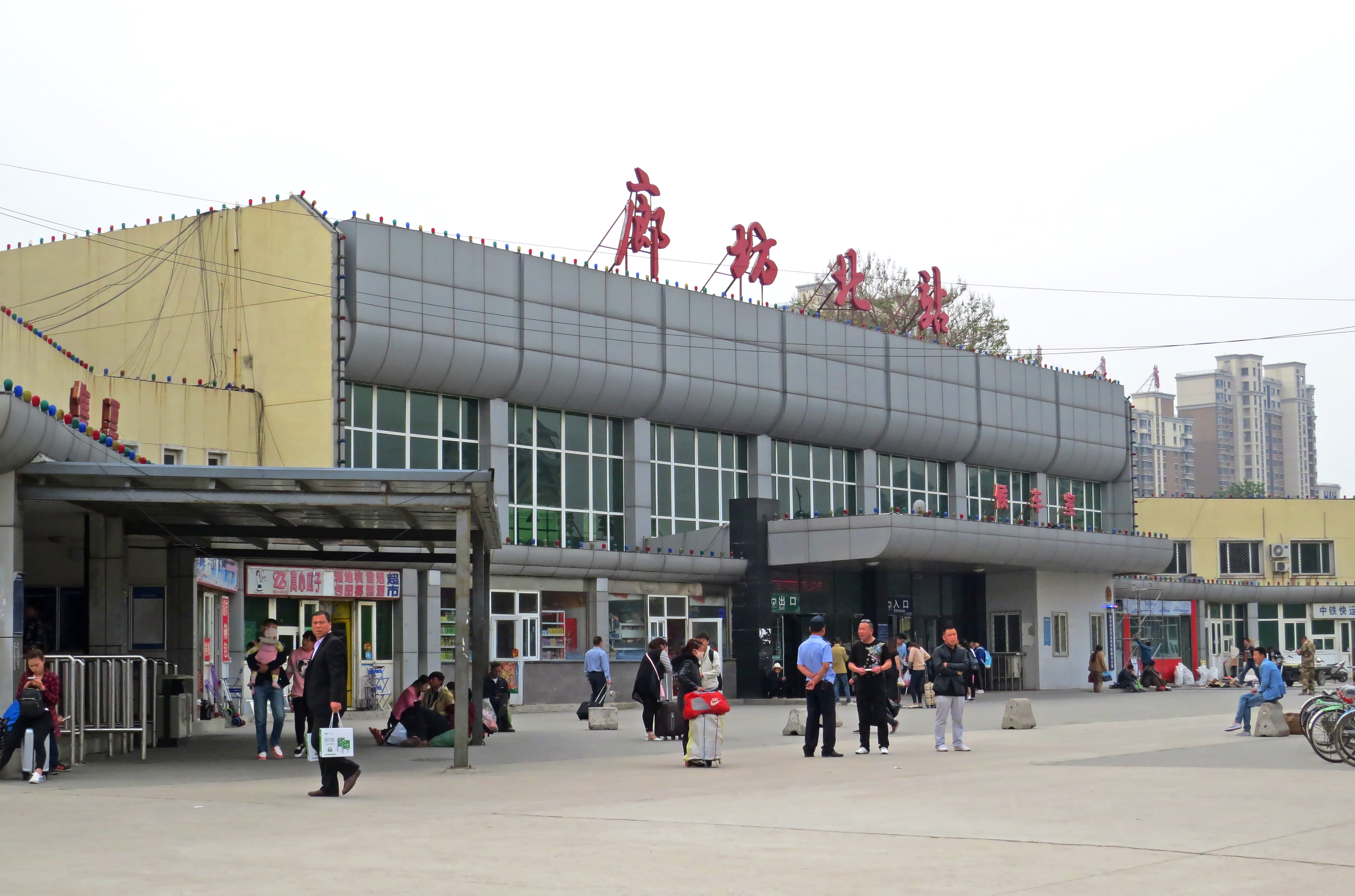
- Guangyang railway station

- Location in Hebei
- Coordinates: 39°32′54″N 116°42′48″E
- Country: People's Republic of China
- Province: Hebei
- Prefecture-level city: Langfang
- Time zone: UTC+8 (China Standard)
- Division code: GYQ

Guangyang District (simplified Chinese: 广阳区; traditional Chinese: 廣陽區; pinyin: Guǎngyáng Qū) is a district of Langfang, Hebei, China.

== Administrative divisions ==
Subdistricts:

- North Yinhe Road Subdistrict (银河北路街道), East Aimin Street Subdistrict (爱民东道街道), Jiefang Street Subdistrict (解放道街道), Xinkai Road Subdistrict (新开路街道), Xinyuan Street Subdistrict (新源道街道)

Towns:

- Nanjianta (南尖塔镇), Wanzhuang (万庄镇), Jiuzhou (九州镇)

The only township is Beiwang Township (北旺乡)

Others:

- Langfang Development Area
