= Gu'an County =

Gu'an County 固安县 Kuan
- County
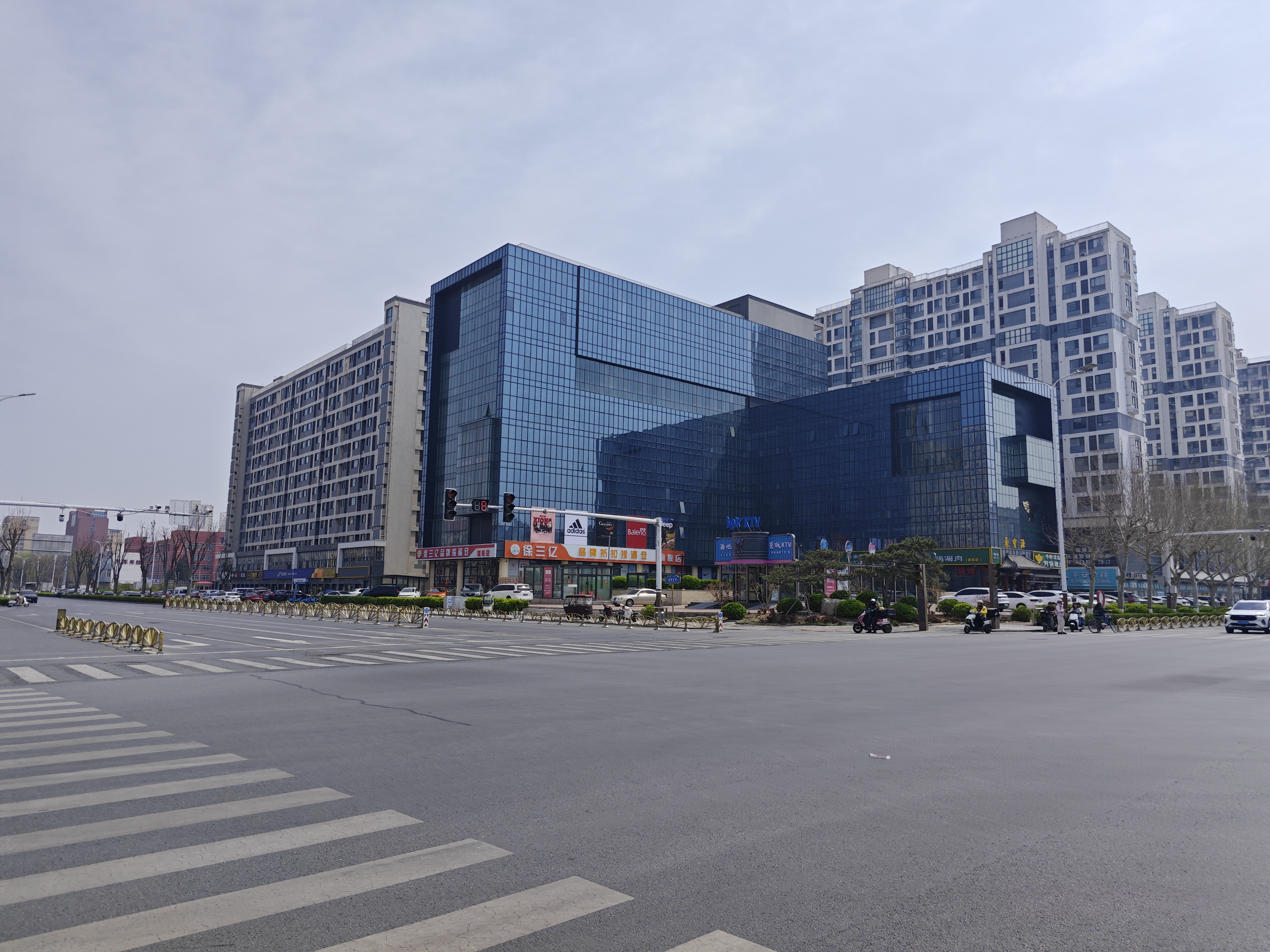

- Location of the seat in Hebei
- Coordinates: 39°27′N 116°18′E
- Country: China
- Province: Hebei
- Prefecture-level city: Langfang
- Seat: Gu'an Town

Area
  - Total: 697 km^{2} (269 sq mi)
- Elevation: 26 m (85 ft)

Population (2009)
  - Total: 400,000
  - Density: 570/km^{2} (1,500/sq mi)
- Time zone: UTC+8 (China Standard)
- Postal code: 065500
- Area code: 0316
- Website: http://www.lfguan.gov.cn/

Gu'an County (Chinese: 固安县; pinyin: Gù'ān Xiàn) is a county of Hebei province, China, bordering Beijing to the north. It is under the jurisdiction of Langfang City, with direct access to central Beijing via both G45 Daqing–Guangzhou Expressway and China National Highway 106. The area is also served by Gu'an railway station and Gu'an East railway station.

== Administrative divisions ==
The county administers five towns and four townships.

Towns:

- Gu'an Town (固安镇), Gongcun (宫村镇), Liuquan (柳泉镇), Niutuo (牛驼镇), Mazhuang (马庄镇)

Townships:

- Dongwan Township (东湾乡), Pengcun Township (彭村乡), Qugou Township (渠沟乡), Lirangdian Township (礼让店乡)

== Climate ==
Climate data for Gu'an, elevation 21 m (69 ft), (1991–2020 normals, extremes 1981–2010)
Month	Jan	Feb	Mar	Apr	May	Jun	Jul	Aug	Sep	Oct	Nov	Dec	Year
Record high °C (°F)	14.7 (58.5)	19.7 (67.5)	30.2 (86.4)	33.2 (91.8)	38.3 (100.9)	39.4 (102.9)	40.3 (104.5)	36.4 (97.5)	34.2 (93.6)	30.7 (87.3)	22.3 (72.1)	14.8 (58.6)	40.3 (104.5)
Mean daily maximum °C (°F)	2.2 (36.0)	6.2 (43.2)	13.5 (56.3)	21.2 (70.2)	27.2 (81.0)	31.0 (87.8)	31.8 (89.2)	30.4 (86.7)	26.5 (79.7)	19.5 (67.1)	10.3 (50.5)	3.6 (38.5)	18.6 (65.5)
Daily mean °C (°F)	−4.1 (24.6)	−0.1 (31.8)	7.0 (44.6)	14.6 (58.3)	20.6 (69.1)	24.8 (76.6)	26.7 (80.1)	25.2 (77.4)	20.1 (68.2)	12.7 (54.9)	4.2 (39.6)	−2.3 (27.9)	12.4 (54.4)
Mean daily minimum °C (°F)	−9.1 (15.6)	−5.4 (22.3)	1.2 (34.2)	8.2 (46.8)	14.1 (57.4)	19.2 (66.6)	22.3 (72.1)	21.0 (69.8)	15.0 (59.0)	7.3 (45.1)	−0.6 (30.9)	−6.9 (19.6)	7.2 (45.0)
Record low °C (°F)	−23.2 (−9.8)	−19.1 (−2.4)	−10.5 (13.1)	−4.5 (23.9)	3.9 (39.0)	9.9 (49.8)	15.0 (59.0)	11.6 (52.9)	2.3 (36.1)	−6.1 (21.0)	−12.4 (9.7)	−20.3 (−4.5)	−23.2 (−9.8)
Average precipitation mm (inches)	1.8 (0.07)	5.2 (0.20)	6.9 (0.27)	24.2 (0.95)	33.7 (1.33)	67.2 (2.65)	177.6 (6.99)	114.9 (4.52)	55.5 (2.19)	29.9 (1.18)	12.7 (0.50)	1.8 (0.07)	531.4 (20.92)
Average precipitation days (≥ 0.1 mm)	1.2	1.9	2.7	4.9	6.3	8.8	11.8	10.5	7.1	5.0	2.8	1.1	64.1
Average snowy days	2.2	2.1	0.9	0.1	0	0	0	0	0	0	1.6	2.3	9.2
Average relative humidity (%)	54	50	46	50	55	64	76	80	74	68	63	58	62
Mean monthly sunshine hours	158.2	162.1	212.6	231.8	259.0	212.5	180.3	197.4	196.3	181.9	150.3	149.6	2,292
Percentage possible sunshine	52	53	57	58	58	48	40	47	53	53	51	51	52
Source: China Meteorological Administration
