= Dacheng County =

Dacheng County 大城县 Tacheng
- County
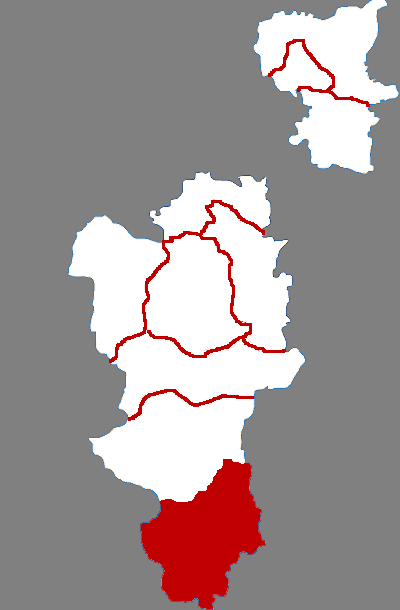
- Dacheng in Langfang

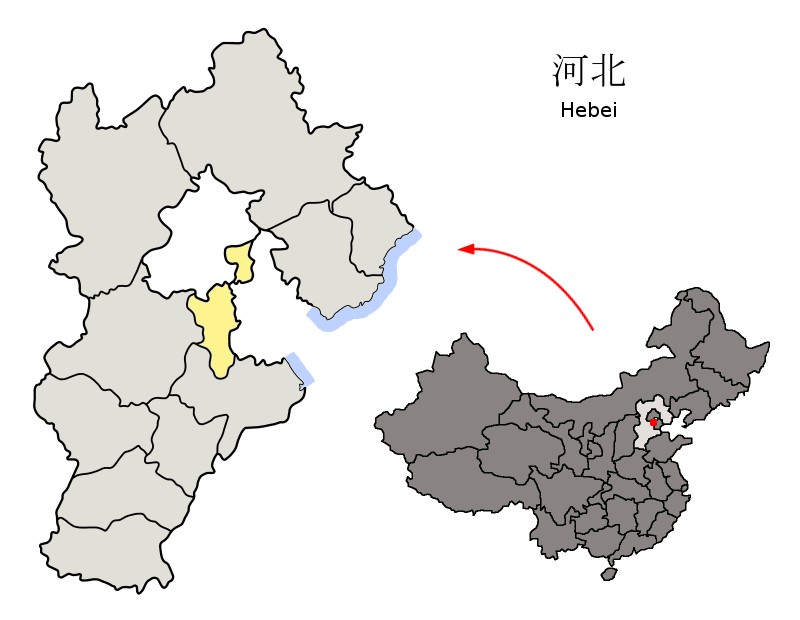
- Langfang in Hebei
- Coordinates: 38°42′19″N 116°39′14″E
- Country: People's Republic of China
- Province: Hebei
- Prefecture-level city: Langfang
- Time zone: UTC+8 (China Standard)

Dacheng County (simplified Chinese: 大城县; traditional Chinese: 大城縣; pinyin: Dàchéng Xiàn; lit. 'Great City') is a county in the central part of Hebei province, China, bordering Tianjin to the northeast. It is the southernmost county-level division of the prefecture-level city of Langfang.

== Administrative divisions ==
Towns:

- Pingshu (平舒镇), Wangcun (旺村镇), Dashangtun (大尚屯镇), Nanzhaofu (南赵扶镇), Liugezhuang (留各庄镇), Quancun (权村镇), Litan (里坦镇)

Townships:

- Beiwei Township (北位乡), Daguang'an Township (大广安乡), Zangtun Township (臧屯乡)

== Climate ==
Climate data for Dacheng, elevation 7 m (23 ft), (1991–2020 normals, extremes 1981–2010)
Month	Jan	Feb	Mar	Apr	May	Jun	Jul	Aug	Sep	Oct	Nov	Dec	Year
Record high °C (°F)	15.7 (60.3)	21.5 (70.7)	30.9 (87.6)	33.6 (92.5)	39.0 (102.2)	41.3 (106.3)	41.3 (106.3)	39.0 (102.2)	35.3 (95.5)	31.4 (88.5)	23.4 (74.1)	15.2 (59.4)	41.3 (106.3)
Mean daily maximum °C (°F)	2.5 (36.5)	6.7 (44.1)	13.9 (57.0)	21.7 (71.1)	27.8 (82.0)	31.9 (89.4)	32.4 (90.3)	30.9 (87.6)	27.2 (81.0)	20.4 (68.7)	11.1 (52.0)	4.0 (39.2)	19.2 (66.6)
Daily mean °C (°F)	−3.8 (25.2)	−0.1 (31.8)	7.0 (44.6)	14.8 (58.6)	21.1 (70.0)	25.6 (78.1)	27.3 (81.1)	25.8 (78.4)	20.9 (69.6)	13.7 (56.7)	4.9 (40.8)	−1.9 (28.6)	12.9 (55.3)
Mean daily minimum °C (°F)	−8.8 (16.2)	−5.2 (22.6)	1.2 (34.2)	8.4 (47.1)	14.5 (58.1)	19.8 (67.6)	22.8 (73.0)	21.6 (70.9)	15.7 (60.3)	8.2 (46.8)	0.1 (32.2)	−6.3 (20.7)	7.7 (45.8)
Record low °C (°F)	−22.9 (−9.2)	−17.2 (1.0)	−11.9 (10.6)	−3.7 (25.3)	2.4 (36.3)	8.3 (46.9)	16.0 (60.8)	13.2 (55.8)	5.1 (41.2)	−4.3 (24.3)	−12.2 (10.0)	−20.1 (−4.2)	−22.9 (−9.2)
Average precipitation mm (inches)	2.4 (0.09)	5.9 (0.23)	8.9 (0.35)	20.8 (0.82)	31.6 (1.24)	66.7 (2.63)	152.7 (6.01)	107.8 (4.24)	42.3 (1.67)	29.9 (1.18)	13.7 (0.54)	2.1 (0.08)	484.8 (19.08)
Average precipitation days (≥ 0.1 mm)	1.5	2.0	2.8	4.3	5.7	7.9	11.5	9.5	6.2	4.9	3.1	1.7	61.1
Average snowy days	2.1	1.8	0.6	0.1	0	0	0	0	0	0	1.3	2.2	8.1
Average relative humidity (%)	57	52	49	51	55	61	74	79	72	67	65	61	62
Mean monthly sunshine hours	154.9	163.4	213.1	232.8	260.6	224.5	195.7	199.5	205.0	190.2	155.1	150.5	2,345.3
Percentage possible sunshine	51	53	57	58	59	51	44	48	56	56	52	52	53
Source: China Meteorological Administration
