= Bazhou, Hebei =

Bazhou 霸州市
- County-level city
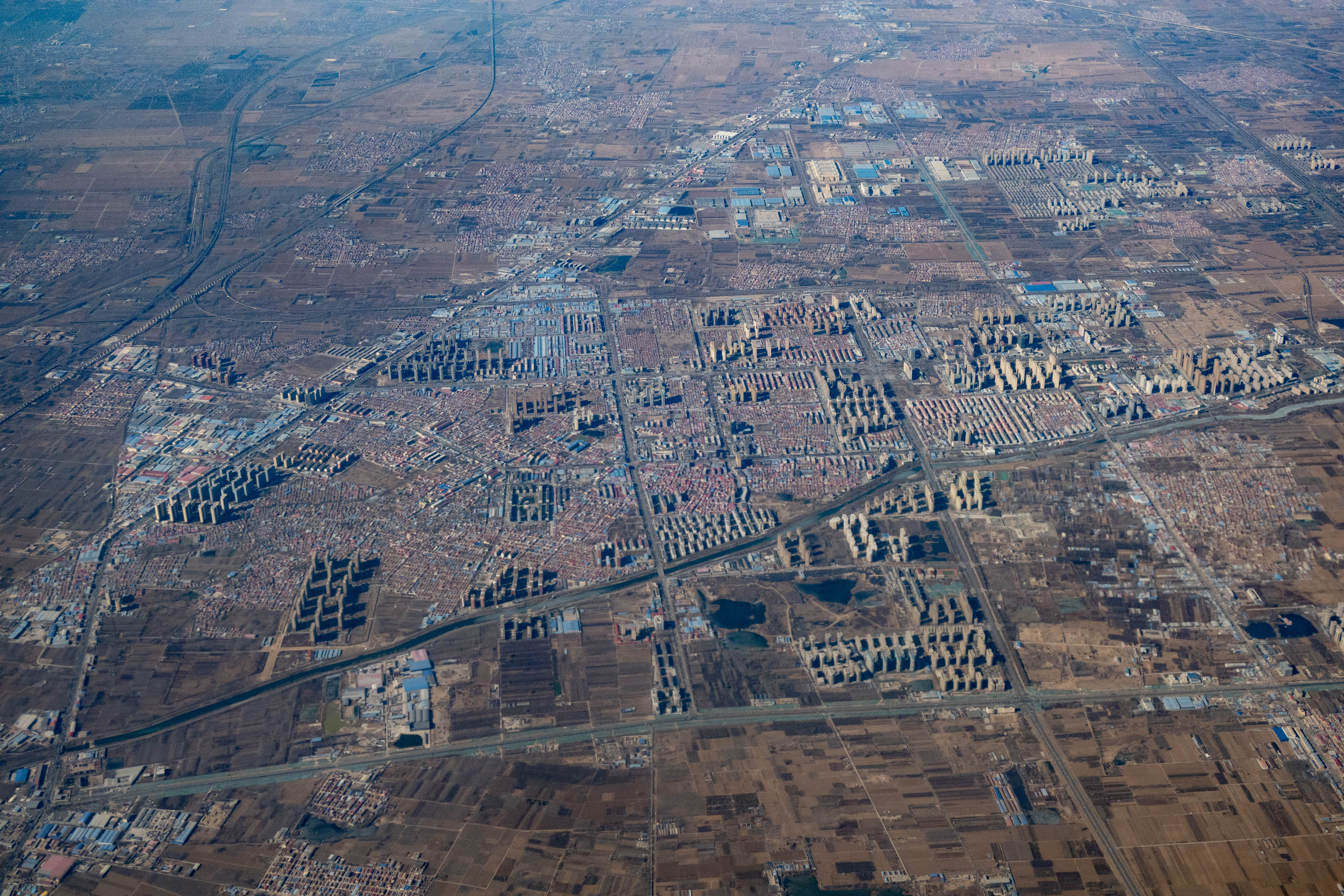

- Location in Hebei
- Coordinates: 39°08′N 116°23′E
- Country: People's Republic of China
- Province: Hebei
- Prefecture-level city: Langfang

Area
  - County-level city: 784.0 km^{2} (302.7 sq mi)

Population (2020)
  - County-level city: 743,226
  - Urban: 455,923 (61.3%)
- Time zone: UTC+8 (China Standard)

Bazhou (Chinese: 霸州; pinyin: Bàzhōu), formerly Ba County, is a county-level city in Hebei province, China. It is under the jurisdiction of Langfang prefecture-level city. As of 2020, it had a population of over 743,226.

== Administrative divisions ==
Towns:

- Bazhou Town (霸州镇), Nanmeng (南孟镇), Xin'an (信安镇), Tang'erli (堂二里镇), Jianchapu (煎茶铺镇), Shengfang (胜芳镇), Yangfengang (杨芬港镇)

Townships:

- Chaheji Township (岔河集乡), Kangxianzhuang Township (康仙庄乡), Dongyangzhuang Township (东杨庄乡), Wangzhuangzi Township (王庄子乡), Dongduan Township (东段乡)

== Climate ==
Climate data for Bazhou, elevation 9 m (30 ft), (1991–2020 normals, extremes 1981–2010)
Month	Jan	Feb	Mar	Apr	May	Jun	Jul	Aug	Sep	Oct	Nov	Dec	Year
Record high °C (°F)	14.5 (58.1)	21.1 (70.0)	30.7 (87.3)	33.8 (92.8)	39.1 (102.4)	40.8 (105.4)	41.1 (106.0)	37.9 (100.2)	35.4 (95.7)	31.0 (87.8)	22.2 (72.0)	14.7 (58.5)	41.1 (106.0)
Mean daily maximum °C (°F)	2.2 (36.0)	6.4 (43.5)	13.6 (56.5)	21.6 (70.9)	27.7 (81.9)	31.5 (88.7)	32.1 (89.8)	30.7 (87.3)	26.8 (80.2)	19.9 (67.8)	10.5 (50.9)	3.7 (38.7)	18.9 (66.0)
Daily mean °C (°F)	−3.7 (25.3)	0.1 (32.2)	7.2 (45.0)	15.0 (59.0)	21.3 (70.3)	25.5 (77.9)	27.2 (81.0)	25.8 (78.4)	20.8 (69.4)	13.4 (56.1)	4.7 (40.5)	−2.0 (28.4)	12.9 (55.3)
Mean daily minimum °C (°F)	−8.3 (17.1)	−4.9 (23.2)	1.6 (34.9)	8.9 (48.0)	15.0 (59.0)	20.0 (68.0)	22.9 (73.2)	21.7 (71.1)	16.0 (60.8)	8.3 (46.9)	0.1 (32.2)	−6.2 (20.8)	7.9 (46.3)
Record low °C (°F)	−19.9 (−3.8)	−17.5 (0.5)	−10.7 (12.7)	−2.0 (28.4)	3.7 (38.7)	8.9 (48.0)	16.0 (60.8)	11.9 (53.4)	4.5 (40.1)	−4.3 (24.3)	−11.0 (12.2)	−22.6 (−8.7)	−22.6 (−8.7)
Average precipitation mm (inches)	2.0 (0.08)	5.3 (0.21)	6.5 (0.26)	19.6 (0.77)	28.9 (1.14)	70.8 (2.79)	155.7 (6.13)	107.0 (4.21)	52.6 (2.07)	26.0 (1.02)	13.0 (0.51)	1.8 (0.07)	489.2 (19.26)
Average precipitation days (≥ 0.1 mm)	1.4	1.9	2.8	4.2	5.6	8.2	11.1	9.2	6.3	4.6	3.1	1.3	59.7
Average snowy days	2.0	2.2	0.8	0.1	0	0	0	0	0	0	1.5	2.0	8.6
Average relative humidity (%)	54	50	46	48	51	60	73	76	70	65	63	58	60
Mean monthly sunshine hours	161.6	167.1	219.1	238.3	268.3	221.9	195.4	202.9	202.9	188.5	151.2	151.4	2,368.6
Percentage possible sunshine	53	55	59	60	60	50	44	48	55	55	51	52	54
Source: China Meteorological Administration

== Transportation ==
There are three railway stations in Bazhou. Bazhou railway station is the oldest and is an intermediate stop on the Beijing–Kowloon railway and the western terminus of the Tianjin–Bazhou railway. Bazhou West railway station is an intermediate stop on the Tianjin–Baoding intercity railway. Bazhou North railway station is an intermediate stop on the Beijing–Xiong'an intercity railway.
