= Langfang =

Langfang 廊坊市
- Prefecture-level city
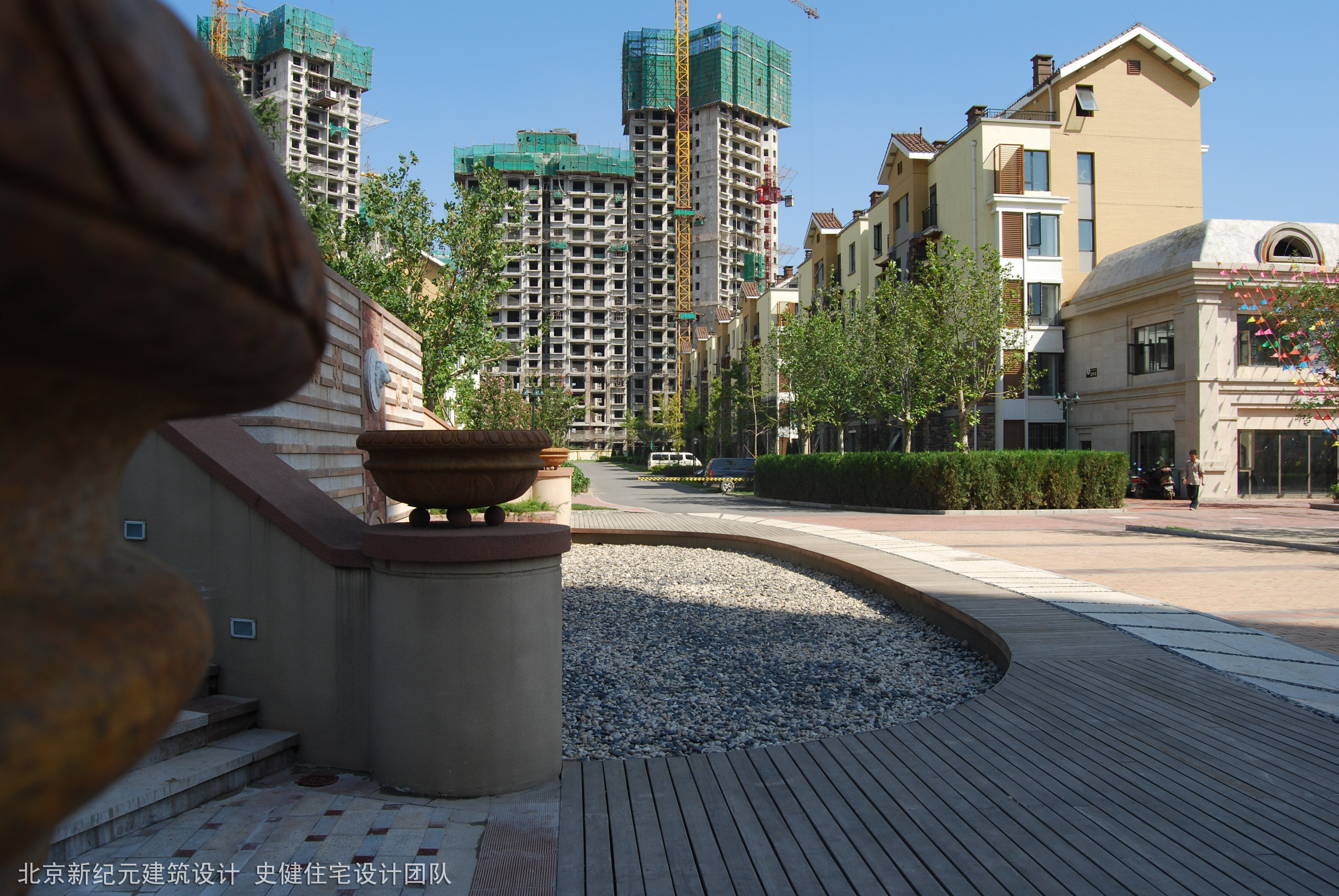
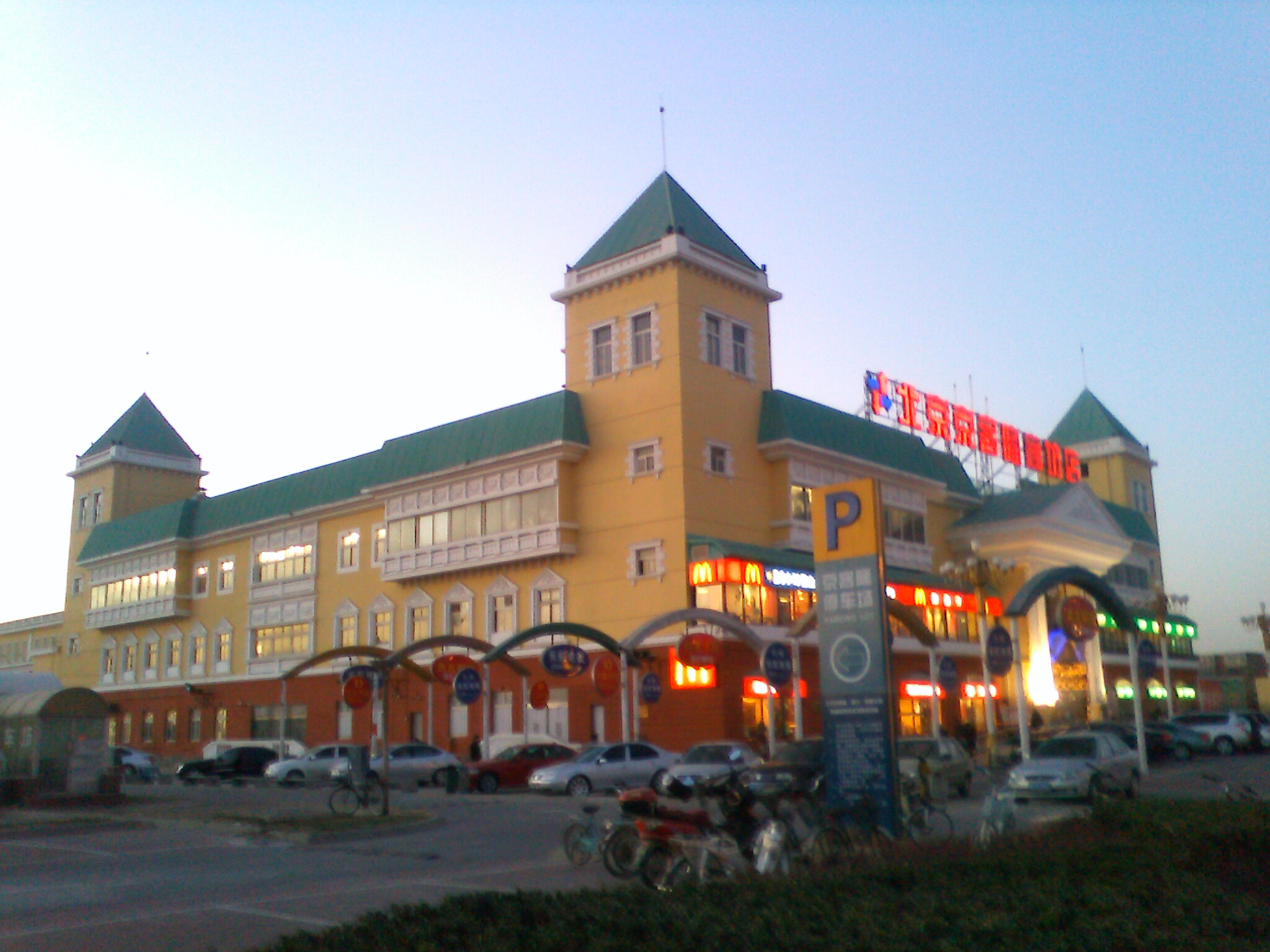
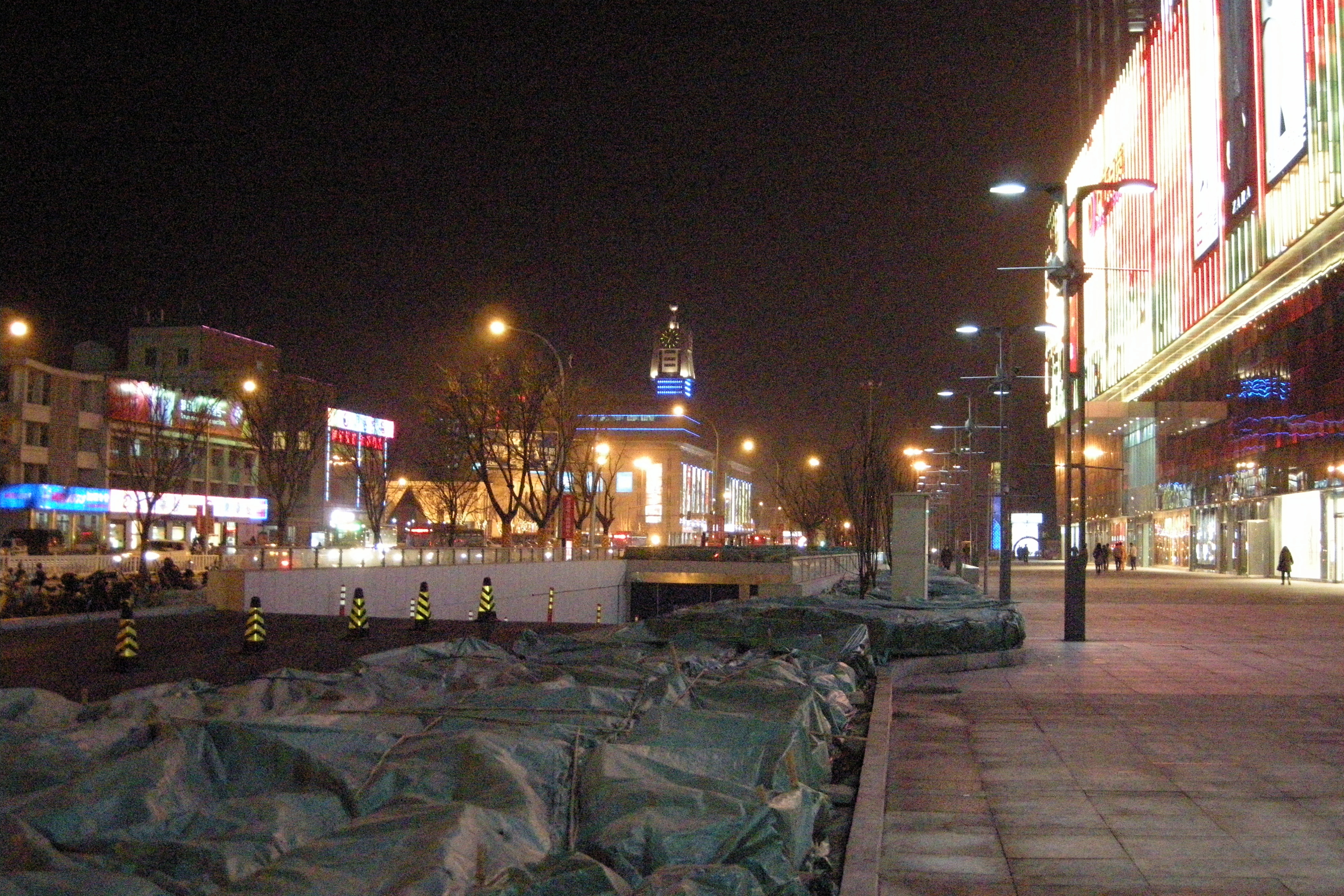
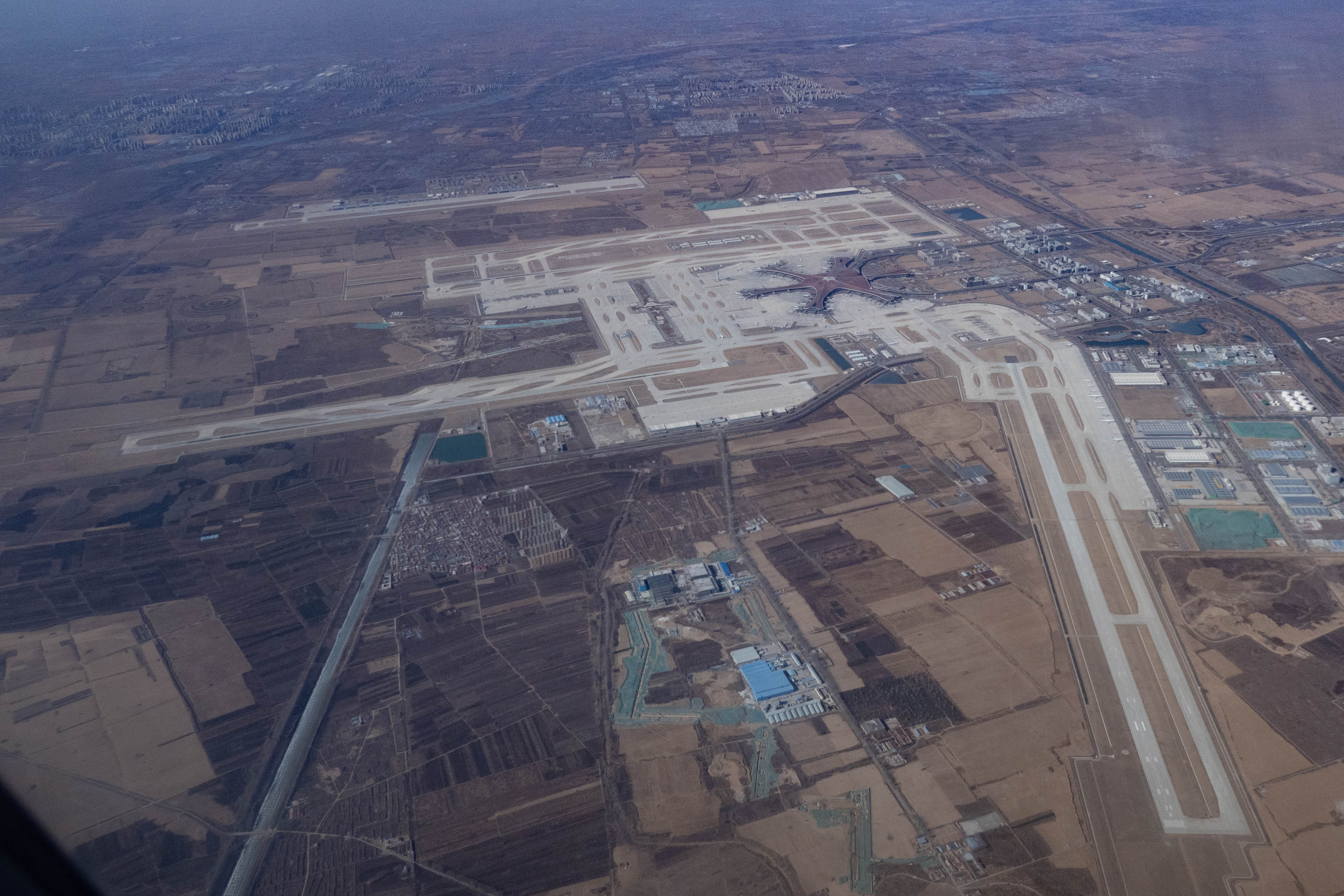
- Clockwise from the top: Sanhe, Jingkelong, Beijing Daxing International Airport, Downtown Langfang at night
- Interactive map of Langfang
- Location of the city centre in Hebei Langfang (Northern China) Langfang (China)
- Coordinates (Langfang municipal government): 39°32′18″N 116°41′01″E
- Country: People's Republic of China
- Province: Hebei
- Settled: 1948
- Established: September 13, 1988
- Municipal seat: Guangyang District

Area
  - Prefecture-level city: 6,417.28 km^{2} (2,477.73 sq mi)
  - Urban: 961.8 km^{2} (371.4 sq mi)
  - Metro: 961.8 km^{2} (371.4 sq mi)

Population (2020 census)
  - Prefecture-level city: 5,464,087
  - Density: 851.465/km^{2} (2,205.28/sq mi)
  - Urban: 1,147,591
  - Urban density: 1,193/km^{2} (3,090/sq mi)
  - Metro: 1,147,591
  - Metro density: 1,193/km^{2} (3,090/sq mi)

GDP
  - Prefecture-level city: CN¥ 281 billion US$ 42.7 billion
  - Per capita: CN¥ 60,769; US$9,000
- Time zone: UTC+8 (China Standard)
- ISO 3166 code: CN-HE-10
- License Plate Prefix: 冀R
- Website: lf.gov.cn

Langfang
- Simplified Chinese: 廊坊
- Literal meaning: "assistant minister's dwelling"
Transcriptions
Standard Mandarin
- Hanyu Pinyin: Lángfáng

Langfang is a prefecture-level city of Hebei Province, China, and was known as Tianjin Prefecture until 1973. It was renamed Langfang Prefecture after Tianjin became a municipality and finally upgraded into a prefecture-level city in 1988. Langfang is located approximately midway between Beijing and Tianjin. At the 2020 census, the population of Langfang was 5,464,087, of whom 1,147,591 lived in the built-up (or metro) area made of Guangyang and Anci districts; its total area is around 6,417.28 km^{2} (2,477.73 sq mi). At the end of 2024, the registered population of the city was 4.972 million, and the resident population of the city was 5.469 million at the end of the year. Langfang borders Baoding to the southwest, Cangzhou to the south (both prefecture-level cities of Hebei), Beijing to the north and Tianjin to the east. Sanhe City and Dachang Hui County are now conurbated with Beijing, so that they form part of the same built-up area. Langfang is the smallest prefecture-level city of Hebei Province by land area.

== Administrative divisions ==
Langfang consists of 2 county-level districts, 2 county-level cities, 5 counties, 1 autonomous county, and one economic development zone (开发区).

Map
Name	Hanzi	Hanyu Pinyin	Population (2004 est.)	Area (km^{2})	Density (/km^{2})
Anci District	安次区	Āncì Qū	350,000	595	588
Guangyang District	广阳区	Guǎngyáng Qū	410,000	313	1,310
Bazhou City	霸州市	Bàzhōu Shì	570,000	784	727
Sanhe City	三河市	Sānhé Shì	480,000	643	747
Gu'an County	固安县	Gù'ān Xiàn	390,000	697	560
Yongqing County	永清县	Yǒngqīng Xiàn	370,000	774	478
Xianghe County	香河县	Xiānghé Xiàn	310,000	458	677
Dacheng County	大城县	Dàchéng Xiàn	460,000	910	505
Wen'an County	文安县	Wén'ān Xiàn	460,000	980	769
Dachang Hui; Autonomous County	大厂回族自治县	Dàchǎng Huízú; Zìzhìxiàn	110,000	176	625

Development area:

- Langfang Economic and Technological Development Area (廊坊经济技术开发区)

== Geography ==
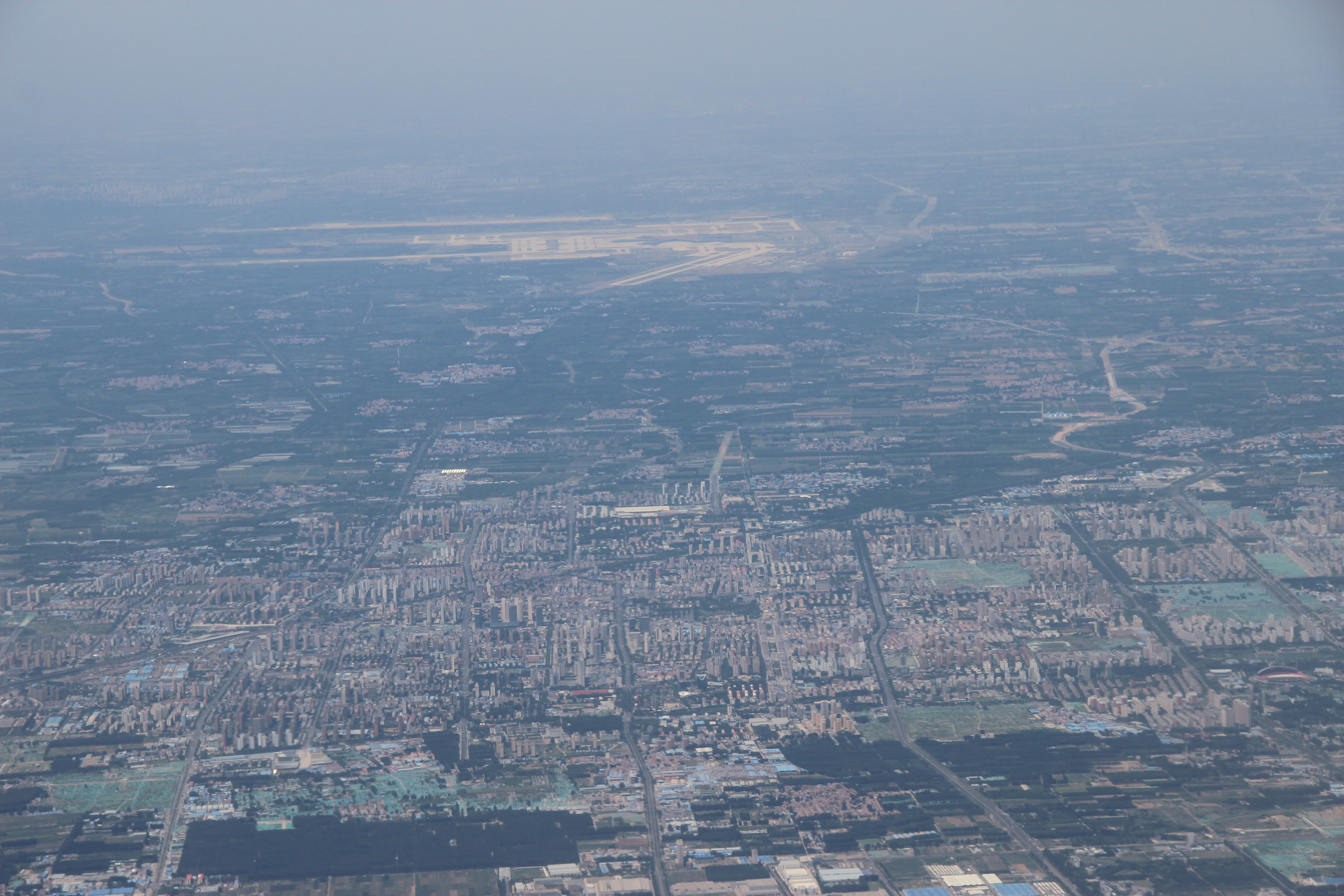
Aerial view of downtown Langfang (below) and Beijing Daxing International Airport in July 2019

Langfang City is located in the central part of Hebei Province, with latitude ranging from 38 ° 30 'to 40 ° 05' north and longitude ranging from 116 ° 07 'to 117 ° 15' east. To the north is Yanshan Mountain, to the west is Taihang Mountain, to the east is Bohai Sea, and to the south is the vast North China Plain.

The area of this city is 6429 square kilometers. In the northern region, there are Sanhe County, Dachang Hui Autonomous County, and Xianghe County; In the central and southern regions, there are Anci District, Yongqing County, Gu'an County, Baxian County, Wen'an County, and Dacheng County. The city governs one district and eight counties, 44 towns, 110 townships, and 3228 administrative villages.

On the other hand, air pollution is a severe problem and in 2013 it was ranked among the 10 worst cities in China for air pollution, along with 6 other cities in Hebei including Xingtai, Shijiazhuang, Baoding, Handan, Hengshui and Tangshan, are among China's 10 most polluted cities. From the perspective of atmospheric environment, pollutants emitted from the Shanxi Plateau, Beijing Tianjin Tangshan, southern Hebei, Shandong, and southern Henan are transported by various wind belts in front of the Taihang Mountains, forming a convergence of boundary layer pollutants. In addition, influenced by the westerly wind belt and the leeward slope terrain of the Taihang Mountains, various types of terrain depressions often form in the Hebei Plain, causing the convergence of pollutants in the region.

=== The "Northern Three Counties" Exclave ===
The "Northern Three Counties of Langfang City" exclave, separated from the rest of the province, is a part of Langfang City. The exclave comprises Sanhe County-level city, Xianghe County, and Dachang Hui Autonomous County and is located between the municipalities of Beijing and Tianjin.

=== Climate ===
Climate data for Langfang, elevation 14 m (46 ft), (1991–2020 normals, extremes 1981–present)
Month	Jan	Feb	Mar	Apr	May	Jun	Jul	Aug	Sep	Oct	Nov	Dec	Year
Record high °C (°F)	14.4 (57.9)	19.6 (67.3)	30.4 (86.7)	33.2 (91.8)	39.1 (102.4)	41.4 (106.5)	40.3 (104.5)	37.0 (98.6)	35.0 (95.0)	31.1 (88.0)	22.4 (72.3)	14.1 (57.4)	41.4 (106.5)
Mean daily maximum °C (°F)	2.2 (36.0)	6.2 (43.2)	13.4 (56.1)	21.3 (70.3)	27.5 (81.5)	31.1 (88.0)	31.9 (89.4)	30.8 (87.4)	26.8 (80.2)	19.7 (67.5)	10.4 (50.7)	3.6 (38.5)	18.7 (65.7)
Daily mean °C (°F)	−3.4 (25.9)	0.1 (32.2)	7.1 (44.8)	14.8 (58.6)	21.0 (69.8)	25.0 (77.0)	26.9 (80.4)	25.7 (78.3)	20.7 (69.3)	13.3 (55.9)	4.7 (40.5)	−1.7 (28.9)	12.9 (55.1)
Mean daily minimum °C (°F)	−7.8 (18.0)	−4.7 (23.5)	1.6 (34.9)	8.8 (47.8)	14.8 (58.6)	19.6 (67.3)	22.6 (72.7)	21.5 (70.7)	15.8 (60.4)	8.2 (46.8)	0.2 (32.4)	−5.7 (21.7)	7.9 (46.2)
Record low °C (°F)	−21.8 (−7.2)	−18.5 (−1.3)	−11.2 (11.8)	−3.0 (26.6)	5.0 (41.0)	10.1 (50.2)	14.6 (58.3)	12.7 (54.9)	3.7 (38.7)	−5.5 (22.1)	−13.7 (7.3)	−19.5 (−3.1)	−21.8 (−7.2)
Average precipitation mm (inches)	2.6 (0.10)	5.7 (0.22)	6.7 (0.26)	23.6 (0.93)	34.8 (1.37)	77.3 (3.04)	164.2 (6.46)	122.0 (4.80)	52.8 (2.08)	29.5 (1.16)	14.3 (0.56)	2.3 (0.09)	535.8 (21.07)
Average precipitation days (≥ 0.1 mm)	1.8	2.2	2.9	4.7	5.9	9.2	11.4	9.5	6.8	4.7	3.2	1.5	63.8
Average snowy days	2.4	2.1	1.1	0.1	0	0	0	0	0	0	1.4	2.6	9.7
Average relative humidity (%)	50	48	45	47	52	61	74	76	70	63	59	53	58
Mean monthly sunshine hours	173.6	180.2	226.3	247.0	275.2	243.2	215.3	219.6	214.0	199.7	165.5	165.7	2,525.3
Percentage possible sunshine	57	59	61	62	62	55	48	52	58	59	56	57	57
Source: China Meteorological Administration all-time extreme temperature

== History ==
On June 26, 1900, during the Boxer Movement, belligerent European forces heading towards Beijing were stopped by Boxers at the Battle of Langfang, and were defeated and forced to turn back to Tianjin. The Chinese forces were victorious.

It was the site of another battle during the Second Sino-Japanese War. In the summer of 1938, on the vast fertile land on both sides of the Luan River east of Beiping and Tianjin, and west of Shanhaiguan and Qinhuangdao, an anti Japanese storm swept across the eastern region of Hebei Province - the Jidong People's Anti Japanese Armed Uprising. The Jidong Uprising, in the history of anti fascist armed uprisings during World War II, was the earliest, largest in number, most widespread in territory, had the greatest impact, and achieved the most significant results in the nationwide armed resistance against Japan.

== Economy ==
Langfang's economy emphasizes computers and technology and manufacturing. To that effect Langfang is home to an Export Processing Zone, an area for factories, and the Oriental University City, a 4-billion yuan investment that began construction in 1999, where some 30 universities enroll about 50,000 students.

There are two national oil and gas companies based in Langfang. The China Petroleum Pipeline Bureau, the primary builder of pipelines in China, and the ENN Group, a natural gas company, are both based in the city.

In recent years, Langfang has focused on digital industrialization, industrial digitization, digital governance, and data value, strengthening the digital economy and empowering high-quality development.

=== Development Zone ===
- Langfang Export Processing Zone

The Langfang Export Processing Zone (Langfang EPZ) was established by the State Council in 2005. Langfang Export Processing Zone is a special enclosed area approved by the State Council and supervised by customs. In accordance with the instructions of the State Council leadership to optimize stock, control increment, standardize management, and improve level, the current "grazing style" for processing trade has been changed to a "captive style" centralized management. Currently, export processing zones have become an important carrier for regulating processing trade management and promoting the transformation and upgrading of processing trade in China. It has a planned area of 0.5 km^{2} and commenced operation in October 2008. It is the only state-level development zone in Langfang. Langfang EPZ is located in the Langfang Economic and Technical Development Zone (Langfang ETDZ), which is a province-level development zone. It is 38 km (24 mi) from Beijing's third ring-road, and 50 km (31 mi) from down-town Tianjin. It is 60 km (37 mi) from Beijing Capital International Airport, and 70 km (43 mi) from Tianjin Binhai International Airport, airports which are China's first and twelfth largest airports in terms of cargo transport, respectively. The nation's fourth largest seaport, Tianjin Port, is 105 km (65 mi) from Langfang EPZ.

== Transport ==
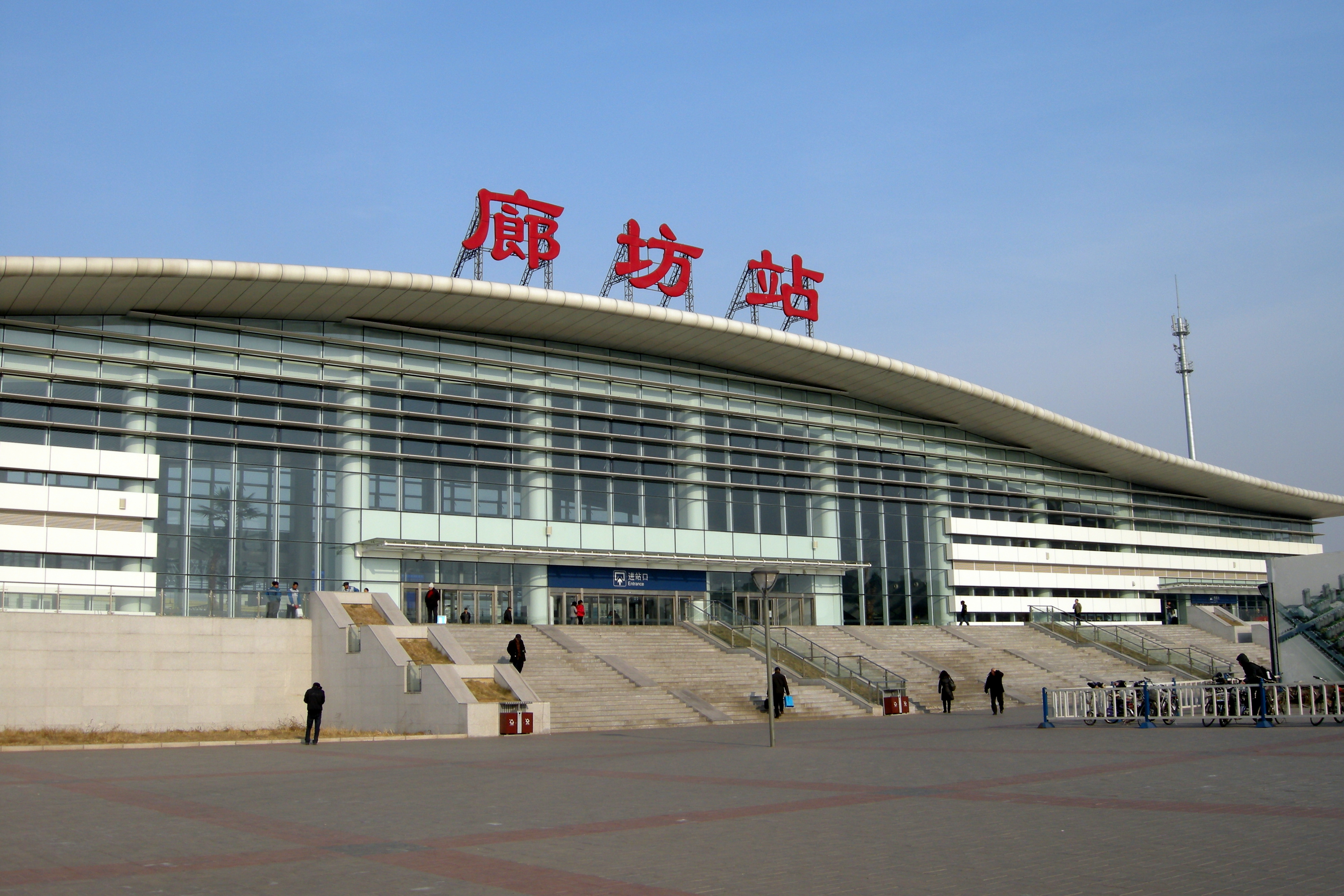
Langfang railway station in Anci District, Langfang

Part of the Beijing Daxing International Airport (IATA: PKX, ICAO: ZBAD) is located in Guangyang District of Langfang. It is also only a one-hour drive from Beijing Capital International Airport (IATA: PEK, ICAO: ZBAA) and the Tianjin New Port.

The Guangyang railway station serves the older Beijing–Shanghai railway, while the newer Langfang railway station opened in July 2011 as the penultimate stop on the Beijing–Shanghai high-speed railway.

The Langfang Railway Station is located on Jiefang Road, Guangyang District, Langfang City, Hebei Province. Langfang Railway Station is 74 kilometers upstream from Beijing Station and 1393 kilometers downstream from Shanghai Station on the Beijing Shanghai Railway. It is under the jurisdiction of the Beijing Railway Bureau's Beijing Rolling Stock Depot and is currently a second-class station and interval station.
