= Beijing–Zhengzhou high-speed train =

Railway service in China

Beijing–Zhengzhou high-speed train 京郑高速动车组列车
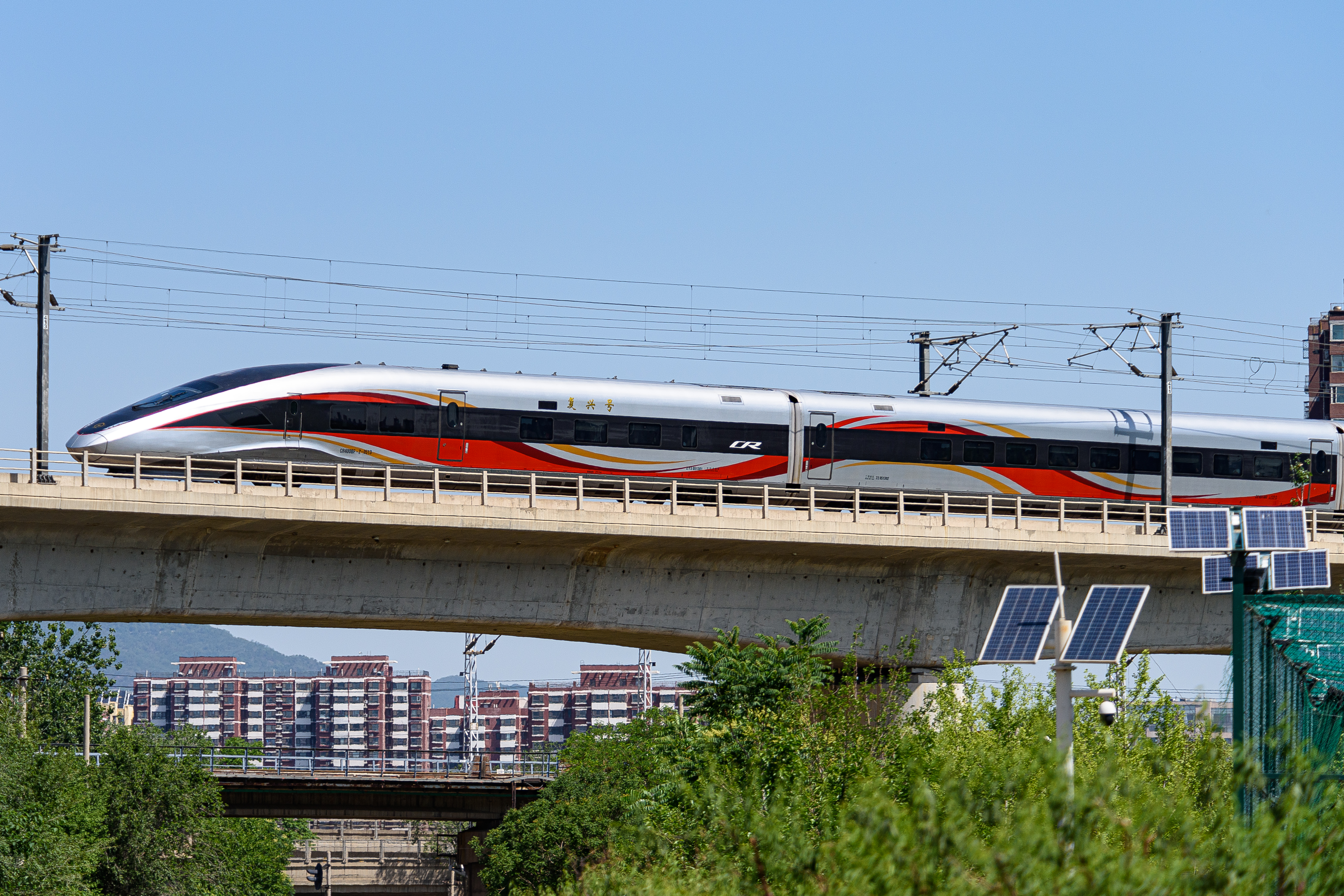
- A CR400BF-Z on G95 service in Shijingshan District, Beijing

Overview
- Service type: G-series trains
- Status: Operational
- Locale: China
- Predecessor: T57/58, Beijing-Zhengzhou D-series trains
- First service: 26 December 2012
- Current operator(s): CR Beijing; CR Nanchang; CR Zhengzhou

Route
- Termini: Beijing West: Zhengzhou East; Zhengzhou
- Distance travelled: 693 kilometres (431 mi) (Beijing West–Zhengzhou East); 707 kilometres (439 mi) (Beijing West–Zhengzhou)
- Average journey time: 2h 25m (G805/807) - 3h 31m (G1564)
- Train number(s): G802/806 (Zhengzhou → Beijing West); G563/565/567/805/807/1563 (Beijing West → Zhengzhou East); G808/1564 (Zhengzhou East → Beijing West)
- Line(s) used: Beijing–Guangzhou–Shenzhen–Hong Kong HSR

On-board services
- Class(es): Business seat; First class seat; Second class seat
- Catering facilities: Dining car; Trolley refreshment service

Technical
- Rolling stock: CRH380A, CRH380AL
- Track gauge: 1,435 mm (4 ft 8 1/2 in)
- Operating speed: 300 km/h
- Track owner(s): China Railway

The Beijing–Zhengzhou high-speed train (京郑高速动车组列车) are high-speed train services between Beijing and Zhengzhou, the capital of Henan Province. Most of the trains are operated by CR Zhengzhou while some are operated by CR Beijing and CR Nanchang.

== History ==
The express train services between Beijing and Zhengzhou used to be the T-series train with train number T57/58 prior to the CRH era. The service was operated between Beijing West and Zhengzhou on the Beijing–Guangzhou railway, with a travelling time of 6h 42m.

In 2007, the T57/58 service was cancelled with the introduction of the D-series trains on the Beijing–Guangzhou railway on 18 April. The D-series trains, operated with CRH2A (was later replaced by CRH5A) EMUs, shortened the travelling time to 4h 47m.

With the completion of the Beijing–Zhengzhou section of the Beijing–Guangzhou–Shenzhen–Hong Kong HSR, the D-series trains on the conventional railway stopped services on 21 December 2012 and was replaced by the faster G-series trains on the new high-speed railway, which was opened 5 days later, on 26 December 2012. At initial stage, 4 pairs of G-series trains were operated daily between Beijing West and Zhengzhou East with train numbers G89/90 and G561-566, and 1 pair of D-series train with train numbers D2021/2022.

On 28 December 2013, the timetables of the services were adjusted and a new pair of G-series trains (G559/560) between Beijing West and Zhengzhou East were added.

There were some major adjustments to the services on 1 July 2014. The only D-series train D2021/2022 was promoted to G-series with train number G563/560. Some trains had their train numbers changed: the former G560 was changed to G562, the former G562 (Luoyang Longmen → Beijing West) was changed to G564, the former G564 was changed to G566, the former G565 was extended from Zhengzhou East to Zhengzhou and was changed to G567, the former G567 was changed to G569, and the former G568 was changed to G570. The service between Beijing West and Xinxiang East also had the train numbers changed: the former G569/570 was changed to G429/430. This pair of train was later extended to Zhengzhou East on 10 January 2016.

After the opening of the Zhengzhou–Xuzhou high-speed railway, the G89/90 service was extended from Zhengzhou East to Zhengzhou, and the G559/560 was extended to Shangqiu on 10 November 2016, and was re-numbered as G1559/1562 and G1561/1560.

On 16 April 2017, the G89/G90, G566 and G569/570 had their train numbers changed to G805/802, G806 and G807/808 respectively. These trains provide non-stop services between Beijing West and Zhengzhou East with a travelling time of 2h 25m.

The G429/430 service was extended to Lanzhou West and became the Beijing–Lanzhou high-speed train on 9 July 2017 after the opening of the Baoji–Lanzhou high-speed railway.

== Operations ==
The G802/805/806/807/808 trains provide non-stop services between Beijing West and Zhengzhou East and are called as "benchmark trains" (Chinese: 标杆车). They are the fastest trains between the two cities with a travelling time of less than 2h 30m. The G563/565/567/1563/1564 trains are services having more stops, with the travelling time varies from 3h 18m to 3h 31m.

- ● : stop at the station
- ↓ or ↑ : pass the station
- —: out of service range
- : Benchmark train

G805	G561	G563	G1563	G565	G567	G807	Stops	G1564	G802	G806	G808
●	●	●	●	●	●	●	Beijing West	●	●	●	●
↓	↓	●	↓	↓	↓	↓	Zhuozhou East	●	↑	↑	↑
↓	↓	↓	↓	↓	↓	↓	Gaobeidian East	●	↑	↑	↑
↓	●	●	●	●	↓	↓	Baoding East	●	↑	↑	↑
↓	↓	↓	↓	↓	●	↓	Dingzhou East	↑	↑	↑	↑
↓	↓	↓	●	↓	↓	↓	Zhengding Airport	↑	↑	↑	↑
↓	●	●	●	●	●	↓	Shijiazhuang	●	↑	↑	↑
↓	↓	↓	↓	●	↓	↓	Gaoyi West	●	↑	↑	↑
↓	●	●	↓	↓	●	↓	Xingtai East	↑	↑	↑	↑
↓	●	●	●	●	●	↓	Handan East	↑	↑	↑	↑
↓	●	●	●	↓	↓	↓	Anyang East	●	↑	↑	↑
↓	↓	↓	●	↓	●	↓	Hebi East	●	↑	↑	↑
↓	●	●	↓	↓	●	↓	Xinxiang East	●	↑	↑	↑
●	●	●	●	●	●	●	Zhengzhou East	●	●	●	●
－	－	－	－	－	－	－	Zhengzhou	－	●	●	－

== Rolling stocks ==
The services are operated by CRH380A or CRH380AL trainsets.

=== CRH380A ===
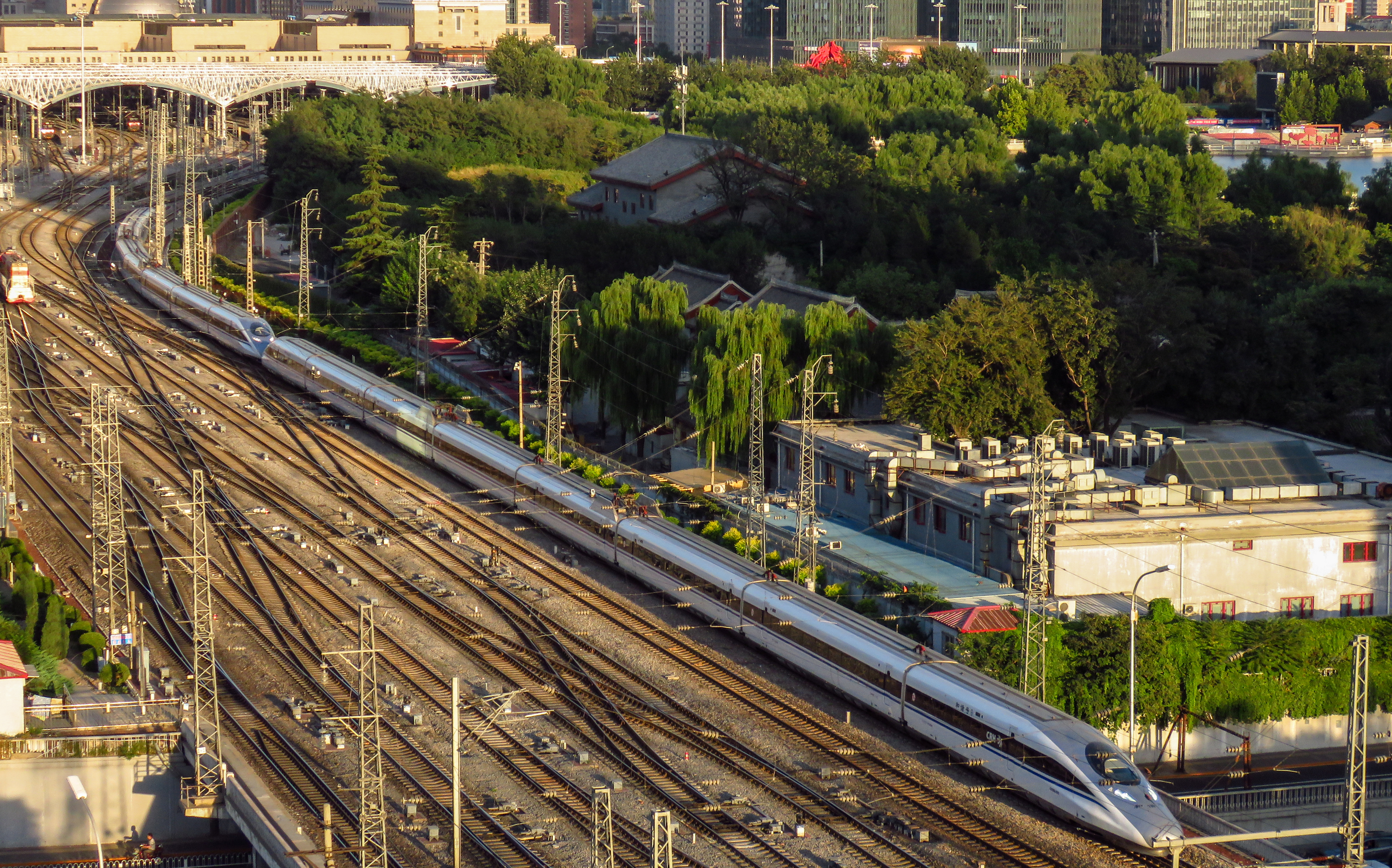
A double-headed CRH380A EMU on G1563 service in Sep. 2017

The G806/561 and G807 services are operated by Zhengzhou-based 8-car CRH380A trainsets with the formation shown below.

Car No.	1	2-3	4	5	6-7	8
Type	ZYS; Business/first class	ZE; Second class	ZE; Second class	ZEC; Second class/dining car	ZE; Second class	ZES; Business/second class

The G1563/1564 service is operated by Nanchang-based double-headed 8-car CRH380A trainsets (16-car) with the formation shown below. This service uses the same trainset with the G487/488 train.

Car No.	1	2-3	4	5	6-7	8	9	10-11	12	13	14-15	16
Type	ZYS; Business/first class	ZE; Second class	ZE; Second class	ZEC; Second class/dining car	ZE; Second class	ZES; Business/second class	ZYS; Business/first class	ZE; Second class	ZE; Second class	ZEC; Second class/dining car	ZE; Second class	ZES; Business/second class

=== CRH380AL ===
The G805, G802/567, G565/808 and G563 services are operated by Zhengzhou-based 16-car CRH380AL trainsets with the formation shown below. The front and rear cars (Car 1 and 16) are for business seats together with 2+2 first class seats. Car 2-3 are first class car with 2+2 seating. Car 4-8 and 10-15 are for second class seats with 3+2 seating. Car 9 is the dining car.

Car No.	1	2-3	4	5	6-8	9	10-15	16
Type	ZYS; Business/first class	ZY; First class	ZE; Second class	ZE; Second class	ZE; Second class	CA; Dining car	ZE; Second class	ZYS; Business/first class

== Other services ==
Some CR Zhengzhou operated trains between Beijing and Zhengzhou have their termini at stations of some other cities in Henan, such as Xuchang East (G562), Luoyang Longmen (G564), Kaifeng North (G1558/1559), and Shangqiu (G801/804, G1560/1561).

Beside the services mentioned above, the high-speed train services between Beijing and most cities in central, south and west China, including Wuhan, Guangzhou, Shenzhen, Hong Kong, Xi'an, Chengdu, Chongqing, Lanzhou, Nanchang, etc., also provide high-speed train connection between Beijing and Zhengzhou.
