= Beijing–Xi'an high-speed train =

Railway service in China

Beijing–Xi'an high-speed train 京西高速动车组列车
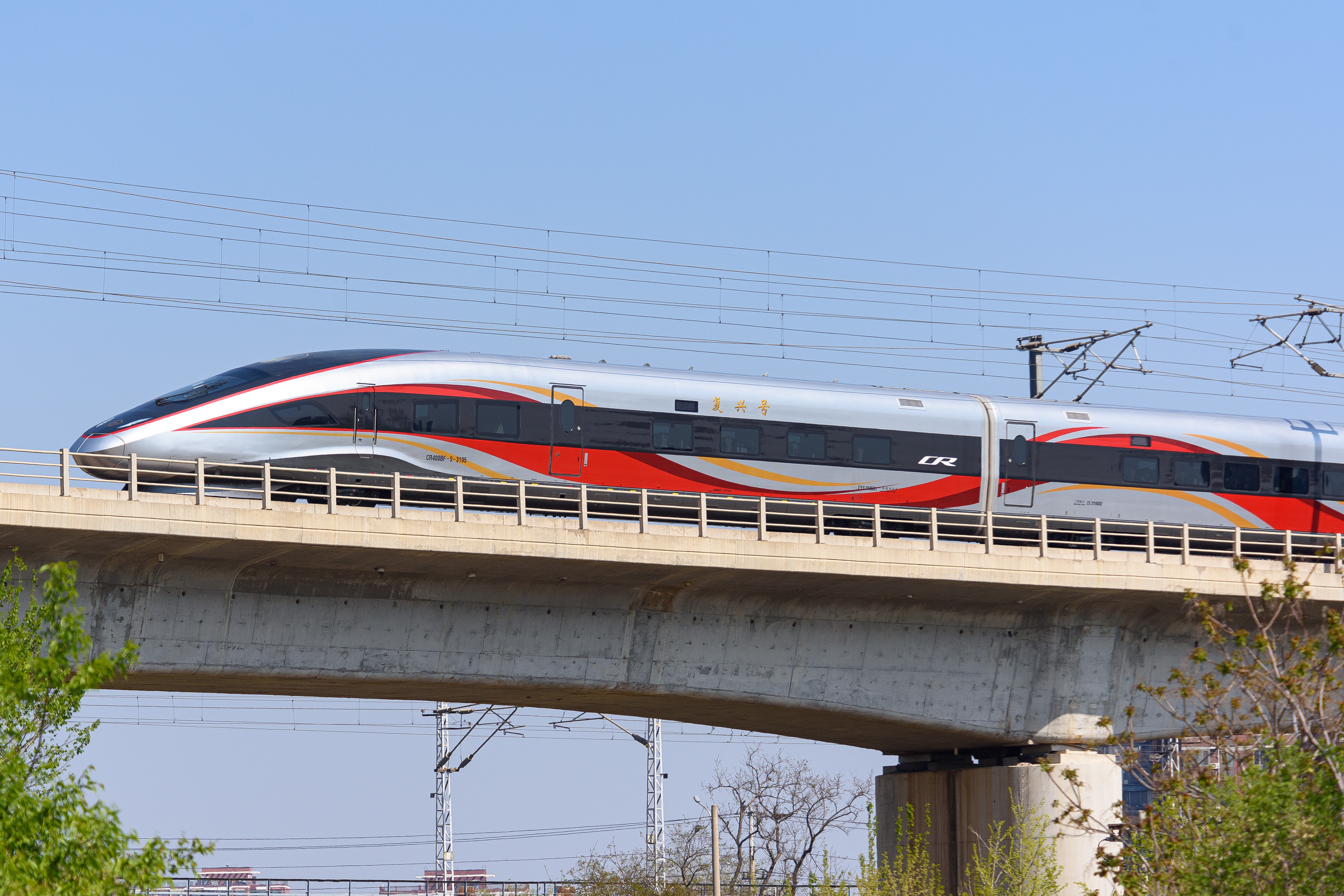
- A CR400BF-S EMU on the G55 service

Overview
- Service type: G-series trains
- Status: Operational
- Locale: China
- First service: 26 December 2012
- Current operator(s): CR Beijing; CR Xi'an

Route
- Termini: Beijing West: Xi'an North
- Distance travelled: 1,216 kilometres (756 mi)
- Train number(s): G25/26, G87/88, G651-670
- Line(s) used: Beijing–Guangzhou–Shenzhen–Hong Kong HSR and Zhengzhou–Xi'an HSR

On-board services
- Class(es): Business seat; First class seat; Second class seat
- Catering facilities: Dining car; Trolley refreshment service

Technical
- Rolling stock: CRH380AL, CR400AF
- Track gauge: 1,435 mm (4 ft 8 1/2 in)
- Operating speed: 300 km/h
- Track owner(s): China Railway

The Beijing–Xi'an high-speed train (京西高速动车组列车) are high-speed train services between Beijing and Xi'an, the capital of Shaanxi Province. The trains are operated by CR Beijing and CR Xi'an.

== History ==
The high-speed train services between Beijing and Xi'an was started on 26 December 2012, when the Beijing–Zhengzhou section of the Beijing–Guangzhou–Shenzhen–Hong Kong HSR was opened.

== Operations ==
The trains were operated on Beijing–Guangzhou–Shenzhen–Hong Kong HSR and Zhengzhou–Xi'an HSR.

The G25/26 and G87/88 trains have fewer stops than other trains and are called as "benchmark trains" (Chinese: 标杆车). The G25/26 and G88 trains only stop at Shijiazhuang and Zhengzhou East, and the G87 train is the fastest from Beijing to Xi'an with only one intermediate stop at Zhengzhou East.

=== Benchmark trains ===
G25	G87	Stops	G26	G88
●	●	Beijing West	●	●
●	↓	Shijiazhuang	●	●
●	●	Zhengzhou East	●	●
●	●	Xi'an North	●	●

=== Other services ===
Beijing West → Xi'an North:

Stops	G651	G653	G655	G659	G661	G663	G665	G669
Beijing West	●	●	●	●	●	●	●	●
Zhuozhou East	↓	↓	↓	●	↓	↓	●	↓
Gaobeidian East	↓	↓	↓	↓	●	↓	↓	●
Baoding East	●	●	●	●	↓	●	●	●
Dingzhou East	↓	↓	↓	●	↓	↓	↓	↓
Zhengding Airport	↓	↓	↓	↓	●	↓	↓	↓
Shijiazhuang	●	●	●	●	●	●	●	●
Gaoyi West	↓	●	↓	↓	↓	↓	↓	↓
Xingtai East	●	●	●	●	●	●	●	●
Handan East	●	●	●	↓	↓	●	↓	●
Anyang East	●	↓	↓	●	●	↓	●	↓
Hebi East	●	↓	●	●	●	●	↓	●
Xinxiang East	↓	●	↓	↓	●	↓	●	↓
Zhengzhou East	●	●	●	●	●	●	●	●
Zhengzhou West	↓	●	↓	●	↓	↓	●	↓
Luoyang Longmen	●	↓	●	↓	●	●	●	●
Mianchi South	●	●	↓	↓	↓	↓	↓	↓
Sanmenxia South	↓	●	●	●	●	●	●	↓
Huashan North	●	●	●	●	●	●	↓	↓
Weinan North	●	●	↓	↓	↓	↓	●	↓
Xi'an North	●	●	●	●	●	●	●	●

Xi'an North → Beijing West:

Stops	G652	G656	G658	G660	G662	G664	G666	G670
Xi'an North	●	●	●	●	●	●	●	●
Weinan North	●	●	●	↓	↓	↓	●	●
Huashan North	↓	↓	↓	●	●	●	↓	●
Sanmenxia South	●	●	↓	↓	●	↓	●	↓
Mianchi South	↓	↓	●	●	↓	●	↓	↓
Luoyang Longmen	↓	●	●	●	●	●	●	●
Zhengzhou East	●	●	●	●	●	●	●	●
Xinxiang East	●	●	↓	●	●	●	↓	↓
Hebi East	●	↓	↓	●	●	↓	↓	↓
Anyang East	↓	↓	●	●	●	●	●	↓
Handan East	↓	↓	●	●	↓	↓	●	●
Xingtai East	↓	●	↓	↓	●	●	↓	↓
Gaoyi West	●	↓	↓	↓	↓	↓	↓	↓
Shijiazhuang	●	●	●	●	●	●	●	●
Dingzhou East	↓	↓	↓	↓	●	↓	↓	↓
Baoding East	●	↓	●	↓	●	↓	↓	↓
Gaobeidian East	●	↓	↓	↓	↓	↓	●	↓
Zhuozhou East	↓	●	↓	↓	↓	●	↓	↓
Beijing West	●	●	●	●	●	●	●	●

Note:

- ●: stop at the station
- ↓: pass the station

== Rolling stocks ==
The services are operated by CRH380AL and CR400AF trainsets.

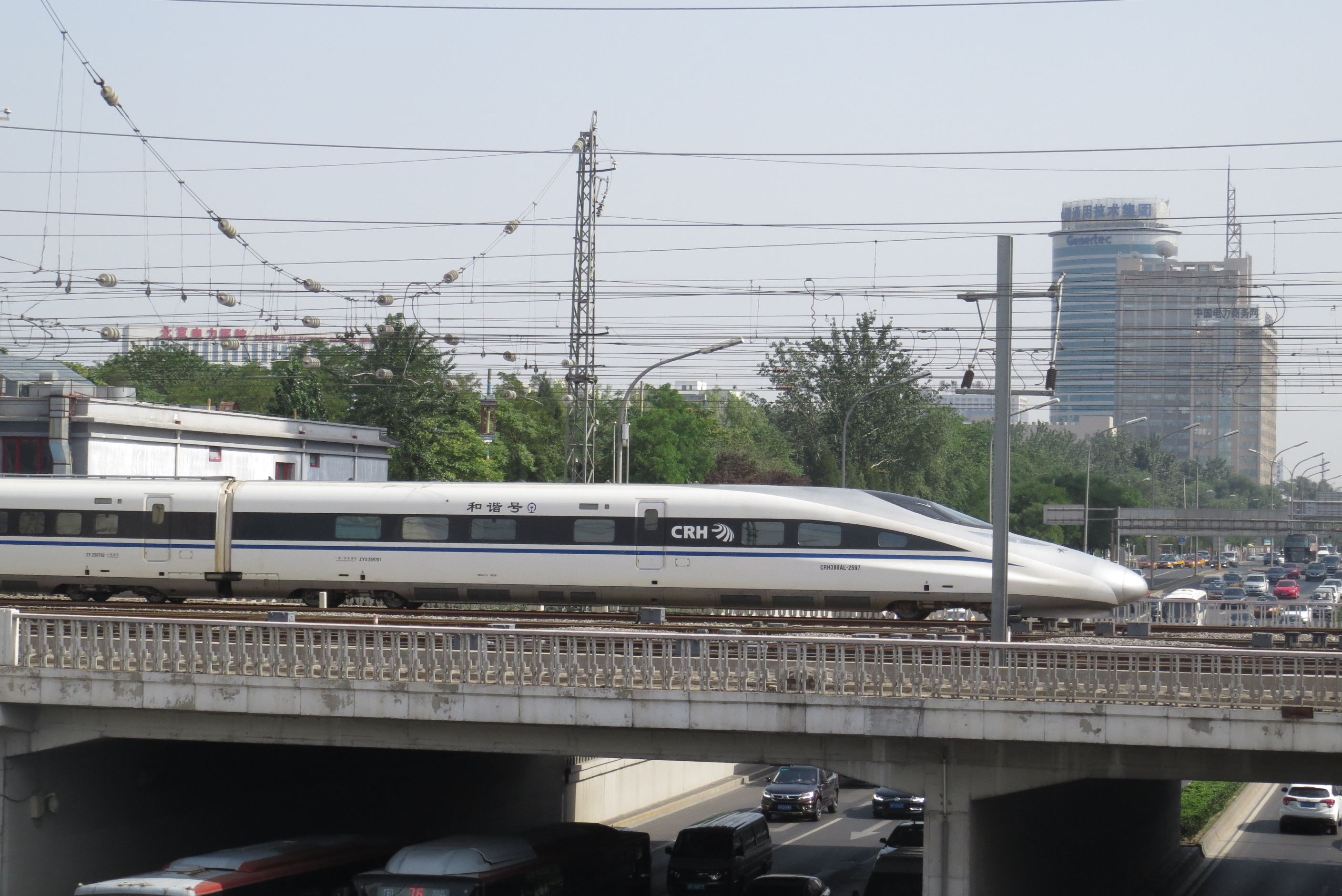
A CRH380AL EMU on G663 service

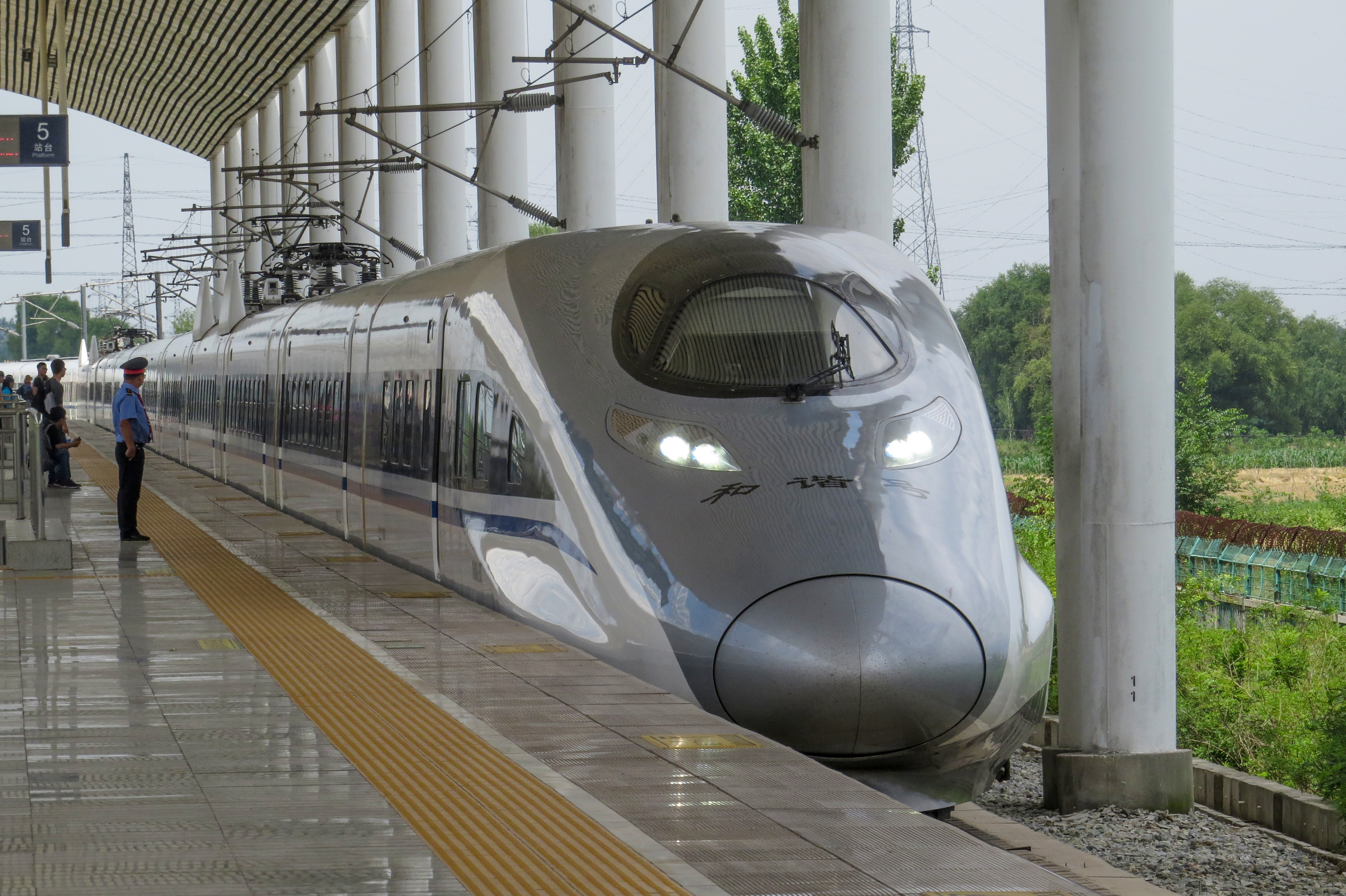
A CRH380AL EMU on G662 service

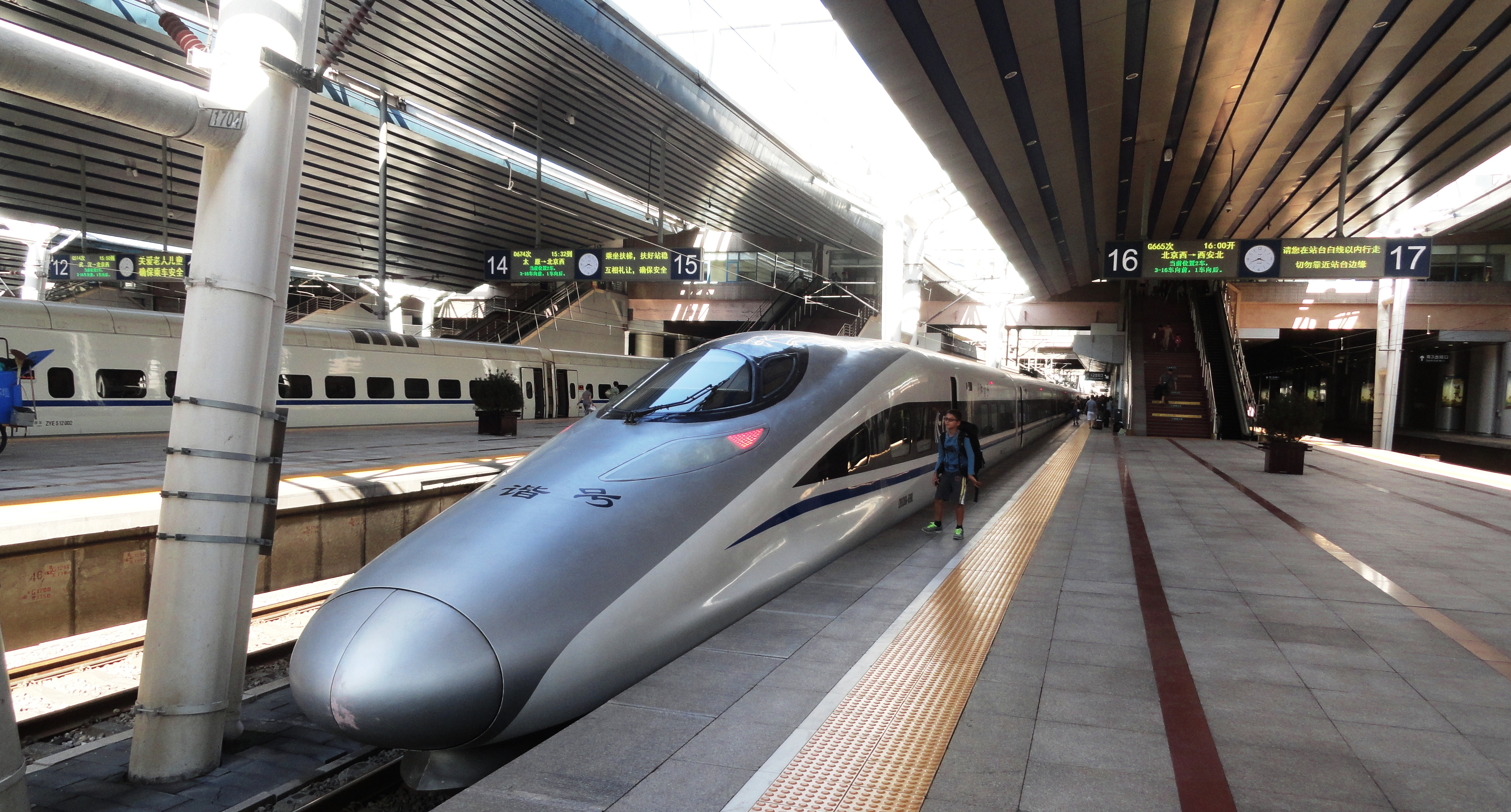
A CRH380AL EMU on G665 service

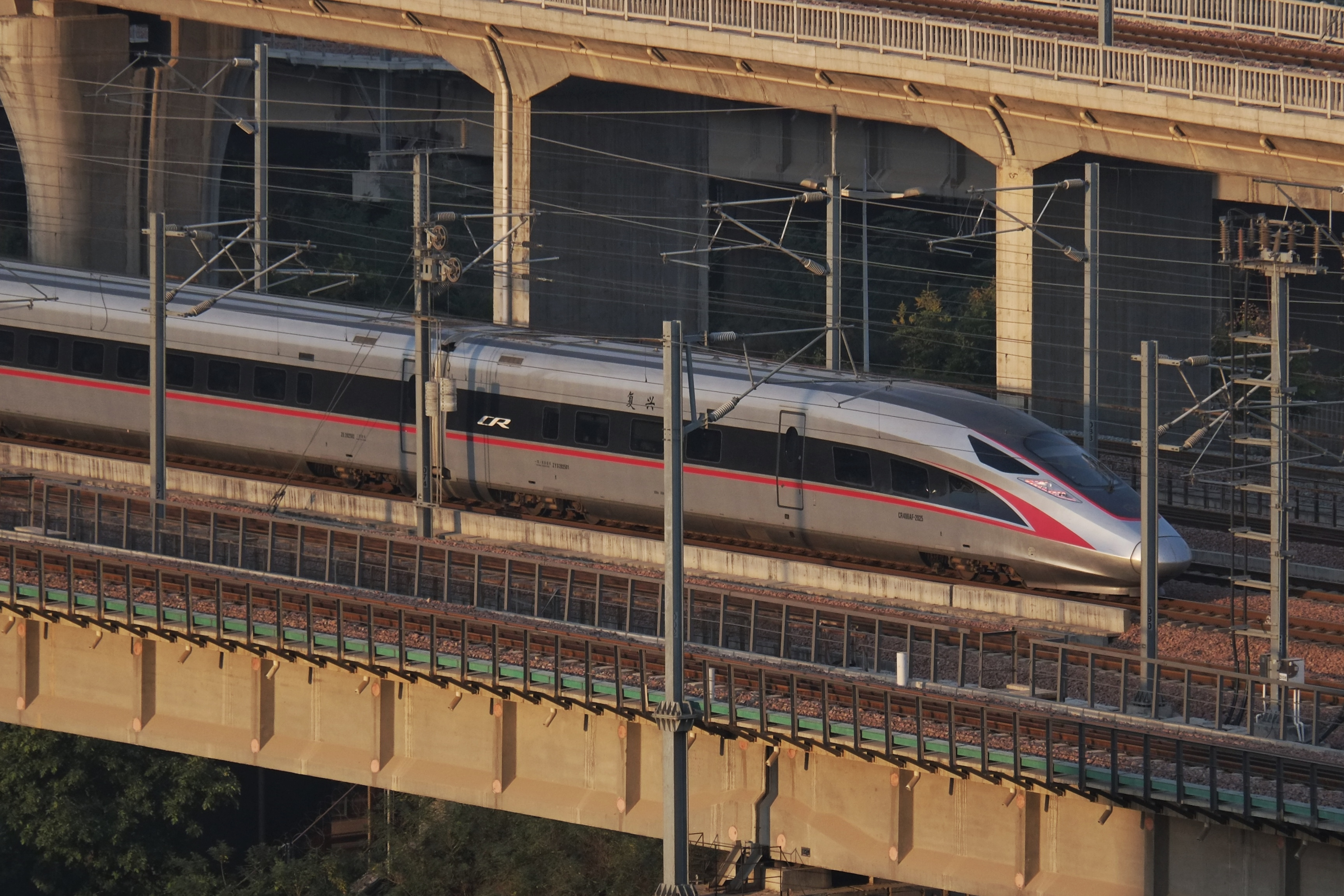
A CR400AF EMU on G664 service
