= Beijing–Shangqiu high-speed train =

High-speed train service

Beijing–Shangqiu high-speed train 京商高速动车组列车
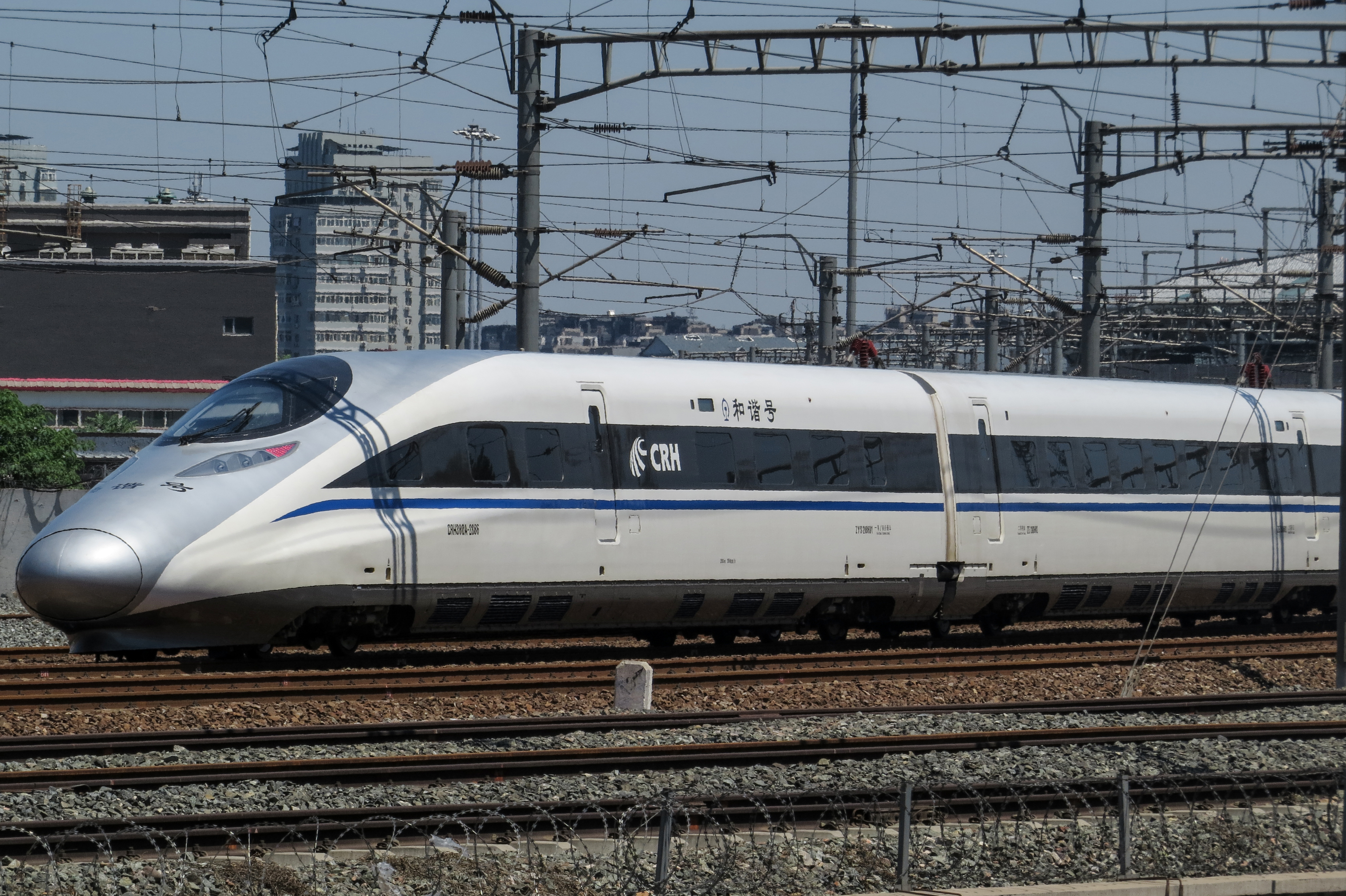
- A CRH380A EMU on the G1568 service

Overview
- Service type: G-series trains
- Status: Operational
- Locale: China
- First service: 9 November 2016
- Current operators: CR Beijing; CR Lanzhou; CR Nanchang; CR Zhengzhou

Route
- Termini: Beijing West; Beijing South; Shangqiu
- Distance travelled: 658 kilometres (409 mi) (Beijing West–Hengshui South–Shangqiu); 862 kilometres (536 mi) (Beijing South–Jinan West–Shangqiu); 883 kilometres (549 mi) (Beijing West–Shijiazhuang–Shangqiu)
- Average journey time: 3h 41m - 5h 19m
- Train numbers: G1567/1568 (Beijing South ↔ Shangqiu); G1555/1558 and G1557/1556, G3941/3942, G3945/3946 (Beijing West ↔ Shangqiu)
- Lines used: G1555/1558 and G1557/1556: Beijing–Guangzhou HSR and Xuzhou–Lanzhou HSR; G1567/1568: Beijing–Shanghai HSR and Xuzhou–Lanzhou HSR; Other train: Beijing–Xiong'an ICR and Beijing–Shangqiu HSR

On-board services
- Classes: Business seat; First class seat; Second class seat
- Catering facilities: Dining car; Trolley refreshment service

Technical
- Rolling stock: CR400AF-Z and CRH380B
- Track gauge: 1,435 mm (4 ft 8 1/2 in)
- Operating speed: 350 km/h
- Track owner: China Railway

The Beijing–Shangqiu high-speed train (京商高速动车组列车) are high-speed train services between Beijing and Shangqiu, a city in east Henan Province. The services are operated by CR Beijing, CR Lanzhou, CR Nanchang and CR Zhengzhou.

== History ==
On 10 November 2016, the former G559/G560 service, which ran between Beijing West and Zhengzhou East, was extended to Shangqiu railway station. The train numbers were revised to G1559/G1562 (Beijing West → Shangqiu) and G1561/G1560 (Shangqiu → Beijing West). This marked the first time that a high-speed train pair originated and terminated directly between Beijing West and Shangqiu, ending the absence of direct high-speed rail service between the two cities.

On 5 January 2017, a new pair of high-speed trains, G1567/G1568, was added between Beijing South and Shangqiu.

On 16 April 2017, a new Beijing West–Shangqiu service, G801/G804, was introduced. At the same time, the G1559/G1562 service was suspended.

On 20 June 2022, coinciding with the new national train diagram and the upgrade of the Beijing–Wuhan section of the Beijing–Guangzhou HSR to a regular operating speed of 350 km/h, several adjustments were made:

- The G801/G804 service was shortened to terminate at Zhengzhou East and renumbered as G95.
- The former Beijing West–Zhengzhou East G561 service was extended to Shangqiu and renumbered G1555/G1558.
- The G1561/G1560 service was renumbered G1557/G1556.
- Operation of the G1555/G1558 and G1557/1556 pairs was transferred to CR Lanzhou.

On 28 September 2026, with the opening of the Xiong'an–Shangqiu section of the Beijing–Hong Kong High-Speed Railway, two new train pairs were added between Beijing West and Shangqiu: G3941/G3942 and G3945/G3946.

== Operations ==
The display board outside a train on the G1567 service

=== Beijing West–Shangqiu, via Shijiazhuang ===
G1555/1558	Stops	G1557/1556
●	Beijing West	●
↓	Zhuozhou East	↑
●	Baoding East	●
●	Shijiazhuang	●
●	Xingtai East	●
●	Anyang East	●
↓	Hebi East	●
●	Xinxiang East	↑
●	Zhengzhou East	●
●	Kaifeng North	●
●	Lankao South	●
●	Minquan North	●
●	Shangqiu	●

=== Beijing South–Shangqiu ===
G1567	Stops	G1568
●	Beijing South	●
●	Cangzhou West	↑
↓	Dezhou East	●
●	Jinan West	●
↓	Qufu East	●
●	Tengzhou East	↑
●	Xuzhou East	●
↓	Xiaoxian North	●
●	Yongcheng North	●
●	Dangshan South	●
●	Shangqiu	●

=== Beijing West–Shangqiu, via Hengshui ===
G3941	G3945	Stops	G3946	G3942
●	●	Beijing West	●	●
↓	↓	Beijing Daxing	↑	●
↓	●	Daxing Airport	↑	●
●	●	Bazhou North	↑	↑
●	●	Xiong'an	●	●
●	↓	Renqiu West	●	↑
●	●	Suning Hejian	↑	●
↓	↓	Shenzhou East	↑	●
●	●	Hengshui South	●	●
●	●	Zaoqiang South	●	↑
↓	↓	Qinghe West	↑	●
●	●	Linqing East	↑	●
↓	↓	Liaocheng West	●	↑
↓	●	Yanggu East	●	↑
↓	↓	Taiqian East	↑	●
●	↓	Liangshan	●	●
●	↓	Yuncheng	●	↑
●	●	Heze East	●	●
↓	●	Caoxian West	↑	●
●	●	Shangqiu	●	●

Note:

- ●: stop at the station
- ↓ or ↑: pass the station

== Rolling stocks ==
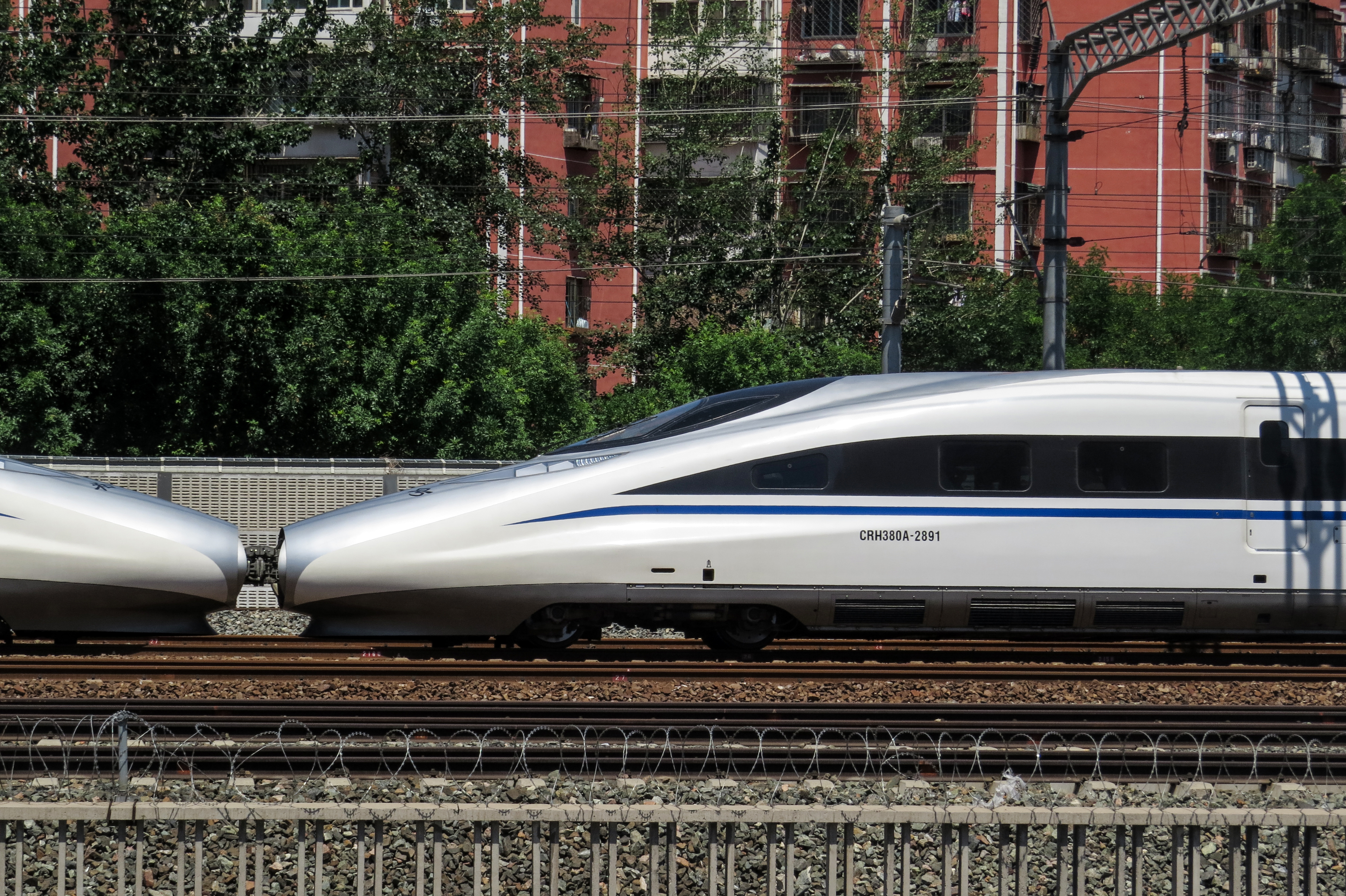
A double headed CRH380A on the G1568 service

The services are operated by CR400AF-Z and CRH380B trainsets.

The G1555/1558 and G1557/1556 services are operated by Lanzhou-based double-headed 8-car CRH380B trainsets (16-car), the G3945/3946 services are operated by Zhengzhou-based 8-car CRH380B trainsets with the formation shown below. G1555/1558 and G1557/1556 service uses the same trainset with the G1405/1406 train.

Car No.	1 / 9	2-3 / 10-11	4 / 12	5 / 13	6-7 / 14-15	8 / 16
Type	ZYS; Business/first class	ZE; Second class	ZE; Second class	ZEC; Second class/dining car	ZE; Second class	ZES; Business/second class

The G1567/1568 service is operated by Nanchang-based double-headed 8-car CR400AF-Z trainsets (16-car),the G3941/3942 service is operated by Beijing-based 8-car CR400AF trainsetswith the formation shown below. G1567/1568 service uses the same trainset with the G965/964 train.

Car No.	1 / 9	2-3 / 10-11	4 / 12	5 / 13	6-7 / 14-15	8 / 16
Type	ZYS; Business/first class	ZE; Second class	ZE; Second class	ZEC; Second class/dining car	ZE; Second class	ZES; Business/second class
