= Shijiazhuang North railway station =

Railway station in Shijiazhuang, China

Shijiazhuangbei 石家庄北
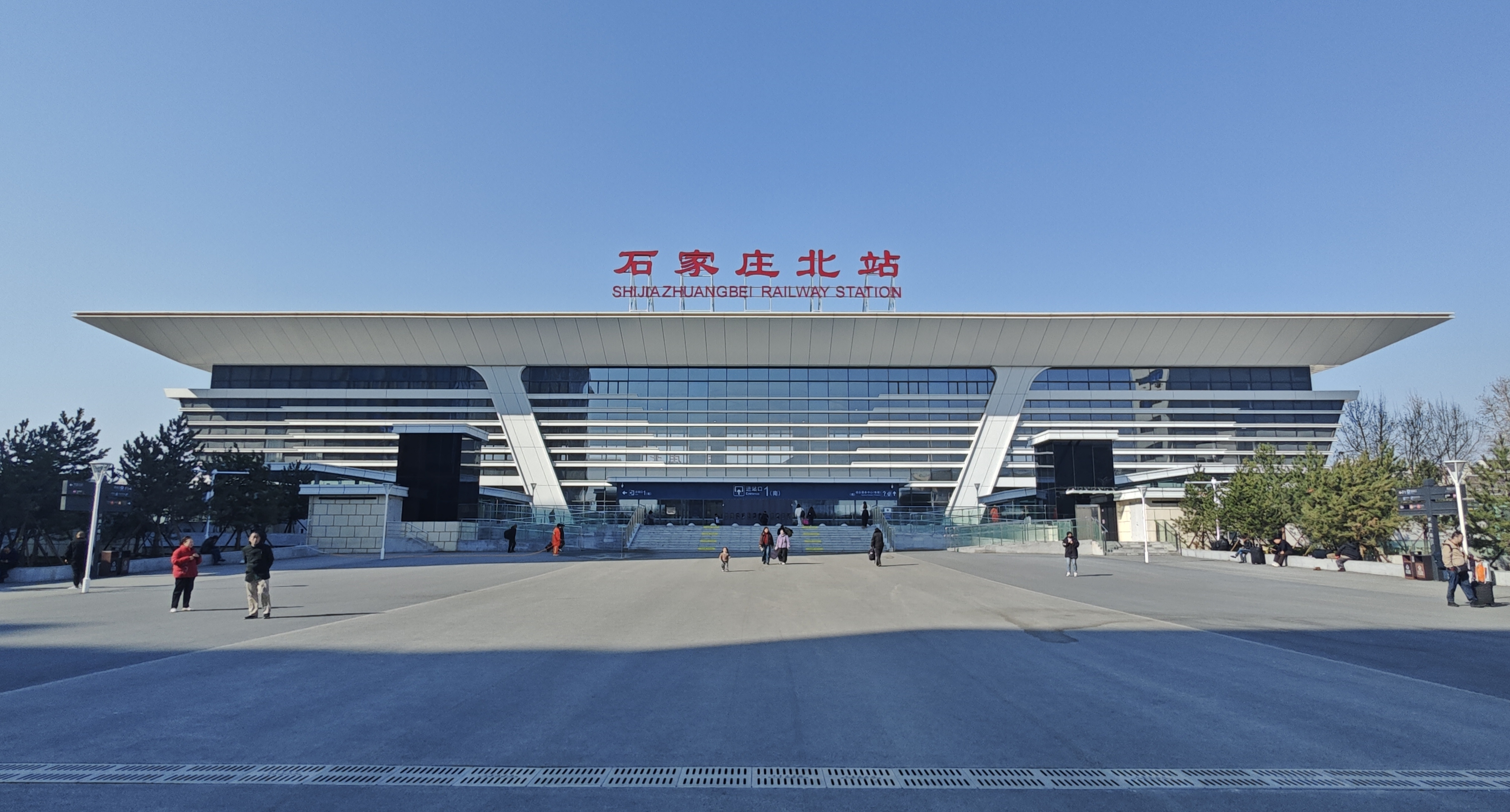

General information
- Location: Shizhuang Road (市庄路); Xinhua District, Shijiazhuang, Hebei; China
- Coordinates: 38°03′58″N 114°27′57″E
- Line: Shijiazhuang–Taiyuan railway
Location
- Location within Shijiazhuang Location within Hebei Location within China

Shijiazhuang North railway station (simplified Chinese: 石家庄北站; traditional Chinese: 石家莊北站; pinyin: Shíjiāzhuāngběi Zhàn) is one of the passenger railway stations in Shijiazhuang, the capital of Hebei province, China.

Shijiazhuang North is a smaller station than the city's main station, the Shijiazhuang railway station. It is used primarily by trains that come from the north (mostly from Beijing) or east (e.g. from Shanghai via Dezhou) and continue west (toward Taiyuan and points west) without entering the city's main Shijiazhuang railway station.

== Notes ==
Preceding station	China Railway	Following station
Shijiazhuang Terminus	Shijiazhuang–Taiyuan railway	Jingxing towards Taiyuan
