= Fucun =

Fucun (富村镇) may refer to:

- Fucun, Hebei, China
- Fucun, Yunnan, in Fuyuan County, Yunnan, China
