= Paul Ristelhueber =

19th-century French diplomat

Paul Octave Ristelhueber (July 19, 1849 – March 12, 1925, known in Chinese sources as 林椿) was a French diplomat stationed in Qing China. He served as the French consul in Fuzhou (1877-80), Guangzhou (1883-84) and Tianjin Concession (1884-91).

Over his tenure in Tianjin, he oversaw the construction of telegraph linking Tianjin and French Indochina in 1889. In 1905, he became the Director of the Societe Francaise de Construction et D'exploitation de Chemins de Fer en Chine Ligne du Chan-si, the company that oversaw the construction of Shijiazhuang–Taiyuan railway in Qing China. Besides, he was the Director of Russo-Chinese Bank in Paris.

== Family ==
Ristelhueber was born in Guadeloupe, the French West Indies and died in Paris. He married Marie Anne Dannet and had two sons, of which Jean René Marie Ristelhueber became a French diplomat, stationing in Beirut (1908) and in Tunis (1924-28).
