= Daying (disambiguation) =

Daying refers to Daying County (大英县), Sichuan, China.

Daying may also refer to:

== River ==
- Taping River, known as Daying River (大盈江) in China

== Towns ==
- Daying, Lai'an County (大英镇), Anhui

Written as 大营镇

- Daying, Suzhou, Anhui, in Yongqiao District
- Daying, Gaoyi County, Hebei
- Daying, Xiong County, Hebei
- Daying, Zaoqiang County, Hebei
- Daying, Baofeng County, Henan
- Daying, Sanmenxia, in Shan County, Henan
- Daying, Weishi County, Henan
- Daying, Jiangsu, in Xinghua
- Daying, Liaoning, in Zhuanghe
- Daying, Shanxi, in Fanshi County
- Daying, Yunnan, in Binchuan County

== Townships ==
- Daying Township, Guizhou (大营乡), in Ziyun Miao and Buyei Autonomous County
- Daying Township, Shaanxi (大营乡), in Qishan County
