= GBD =

GBD may refer to:

- Gilberdyke railway station, in England
- Gigabaud (GBd)
- Great Bend Municipal Airport, Kansas, US
- Global Burden of Disease Study
- Green Beer Day, Miami University tradition
- Gaobeidian East railway station, China Railway pinyin code
- Gali Batu Depot, Singapore, by MRT depot code
- Great Barrington Declaration, a COVID-19 open letter
- Gundam Build Divers, Japanese anime series
- Golden Brown Delicious, referred to the Maillard Reaction
- Nationality code of British Overseas Territories Citizen in the machine-readable passport
