= Gaoyi Town =

Gaoyi Town 高邑镇
- Town
- Location in Hebei
- Coordinates: 37°56′57″N 114°36′41″E
- Country: People's Republic of China
- Province: Hebei
- Prefecture-level city: Shijiazhuang
- County: Gaoyi
- Village-level divisions: 24 villages
- Elevation: 50 m (160 ft)
- Time zone: UTC+8 (China Standard)
- Postal code: 051330
- Area code: 0311

Gaoyi (Chinese: 高邑; pinyin: Gāoyì) is a town in and the seat of Gaoyi County, in southwestern Hebei province, China, about 48 km (30 mi) south of the provincial capital of Shijiazhuang. As of 2018, it has 24 villages under its administration. It is directly serviced by China National Highway 107 and just off of G4 Beijing–Hong Kong and Macau Expressway.

== See also ==
- List of township-level divisions of Hebei
