= Dingzhou East railway station =

Railway station in Baoding, China

Dingzhou East 定州东
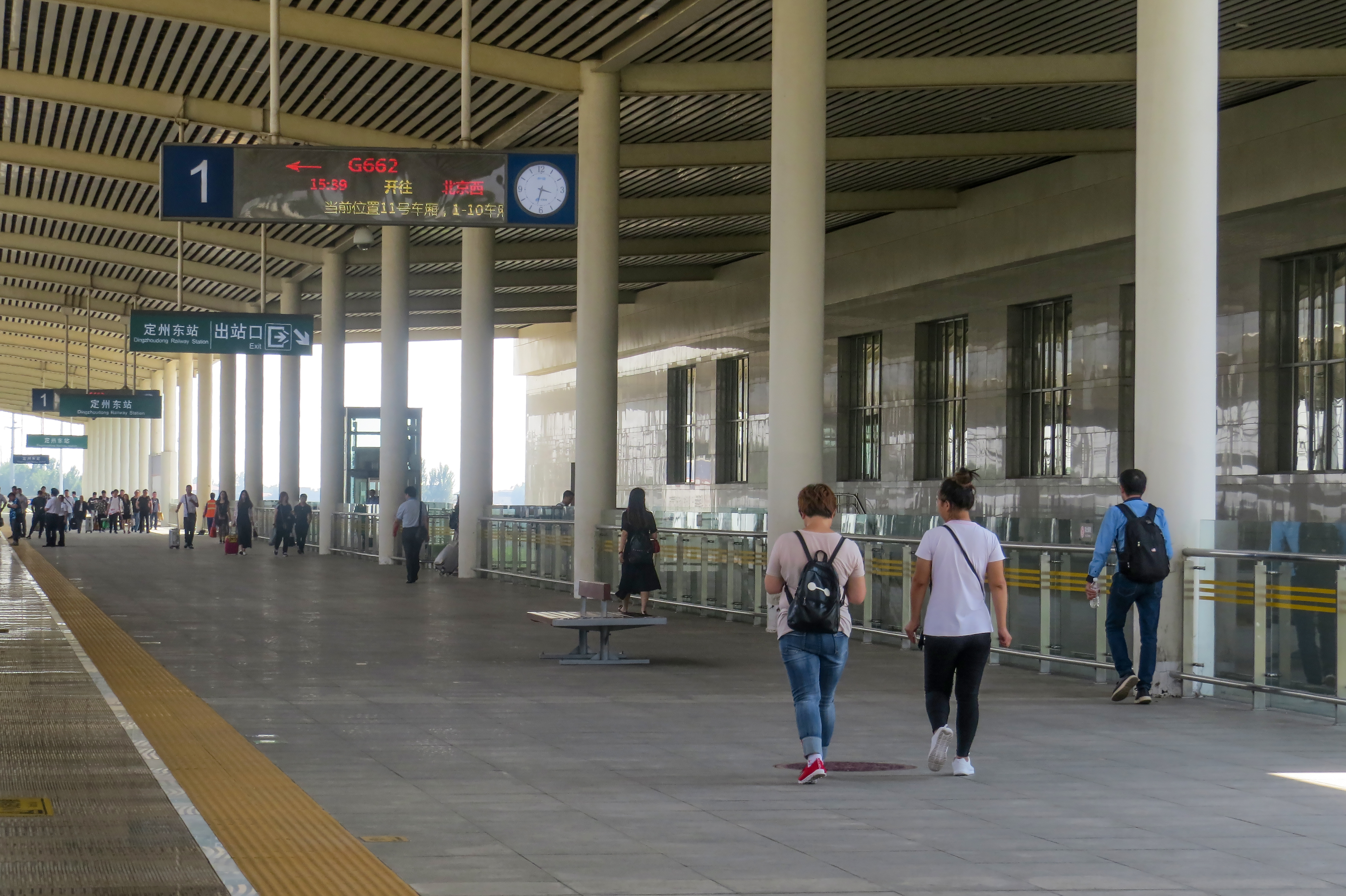

General information
- Location: Dingzhou, Baoding, Hebei; China
- Coordinates: 38°30′31″N 115°04′30″E
- Operator: CR Beijing
- Line: Beijing–Shijiazhuang high-speed railway
- Platforms: 2
- Tracks: 4
- Connections: Bus terminal

Other information
- Status: Operational
- Station code: 22516 (TMIS code); DOP (telegraph code); DZD (Pinyin code)

History
- Opened: December 26, 2012

Services
Preceding station	China Railway High-speed	Following station
Baoding East towards Beijing West	Beijing–Shijiazhuang high-speed railway	Zhengding Airport towards Shijiazhuang
Location
- Location within Hebei

Dingzhou East railway station (simplified Chinese: 定州东站; traditional Chinese: 定州東站; pinyin: Dìngzhōudōng Zhàn) is a railway station on the Beijing–Guangzhou–Shenzhen–Hong Kong high-speed railway in Dingzhou, Hebei. It opened with the Beijing-Zhengzhou section of the railway on 26 December 2012.
