= Gaoyi County =

Gaoyi County 高邑县 Kaoyi
- County
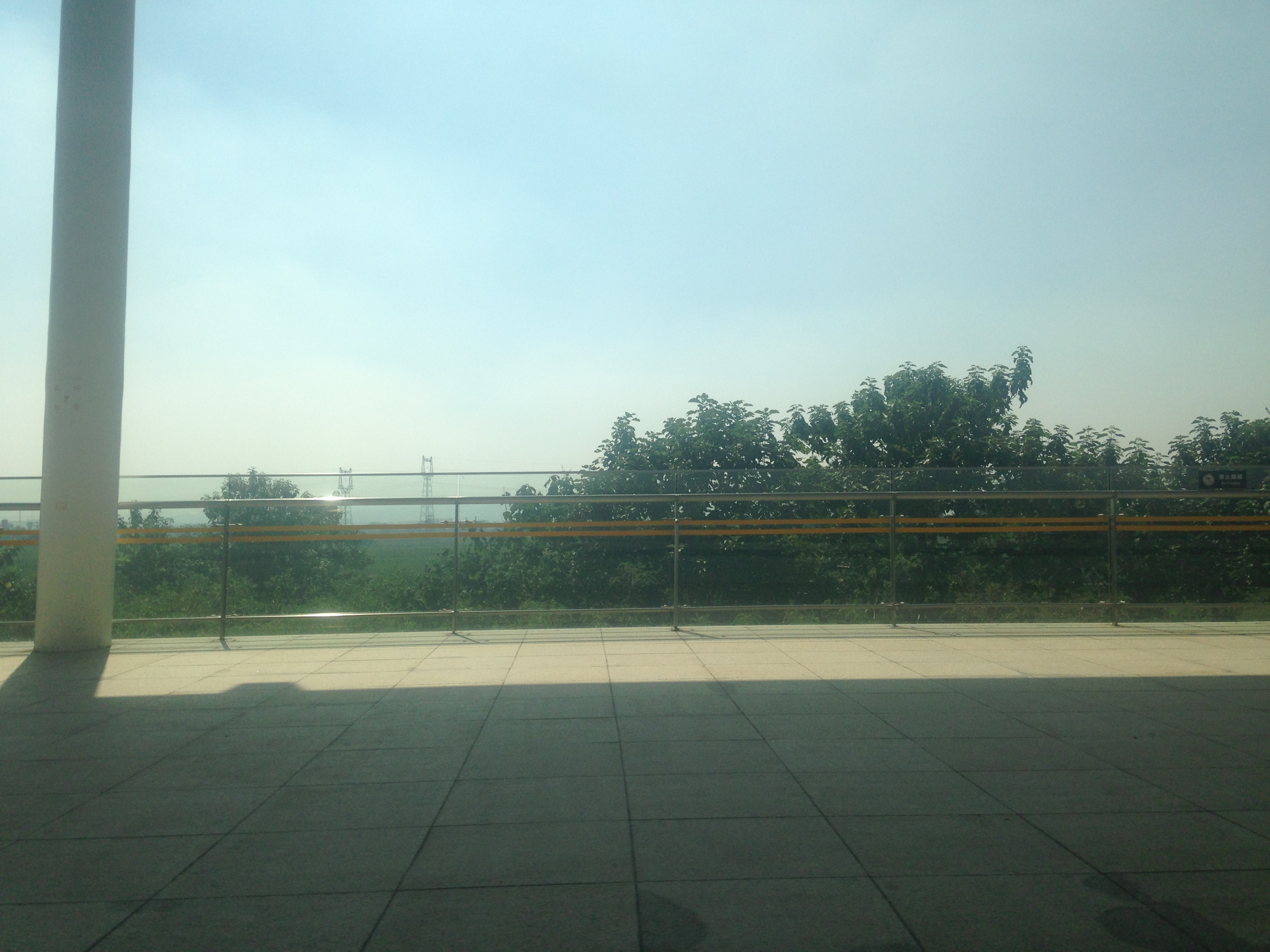
- View from Gaoyi West railway station
- Interactive map of Gaoyi County
- Location in Hebei
- Coordinates: 37°36′55″N 114°36′41″E
- Country: People's Republic of China
- Province: Hebei
- Prefecture-level city: Shijiazhuang

Area
  - Total: 221.2 km^{2} (85.4 sq mi)

Population (2020 census)
  - Total: 178,368
  - Density: 806.4/km^{2} (2,088/sq mi)
- Time zone: UTC+8 (China Standard)
- Division code: GYJ

Gaoyi (Chinese: 高邑; pinyin: Gāoyì; lit. 'High City') is a county of Hebei Province, North China, under the administration of the prefecture-level city of Shijiazhuang, the capital of the province.

== Administrative divisions ==
Towns:

- Gaoyi Town (高邑镇), Daying Town (大营镇), Fucun Town (富村镇)

Townships:

- Zhonghan Township (中韩乡), Wancheng Township (万城乡)

== Climate ==
Climate data for Gaoyi, elevation 45 m (148 ft), (1991–2020 normals, extremes 1981–present)
Month	Jan	Feb	Mar	Apr	May	Jun	Jul	Aug	Sep	Oct	Nov	Dec	Year
Record high °C (°F)	20.5 (68.9)	25.8 (78.4)	33.2 (91.8)	35.4 (95.7)	39.5 (103.1)	41.9 (107.4)	43.3 (109.9)	36.9 (98.4)	37.2 (99.0)	32.8 (91.0)	27.7 (81.9)	23.3 (73.9)	43.3 (109.9)
Mean daily maximum °C (°F)	3.6 (38.5)	7.8 (46.0)	14.8 (58.6)	21.6 (70.9)	27.3 (81.1)	32.4 (90.3)	32.5 (90.5)	30.6 (87.1)	26.9 (80.4)	20.9 (69.6)	11.6 (52.9)	4.9 (40.8)	19.6 (67.2)
Daily mean °C (°F)	−2.4 (27.7)	1.4 (34.5)	8.1 (46.6)	15.1 (59.2)	20.9 (69.6)	26.0 (78.8)	27.3 (81.1)	25.5 (77.9)	20.8 (69.4)	14.4 (57.9)	5.7 (42.3)	−0.7 (30.7)	13.5 (56.3)
Mean daily minimum °C (°F)	−6.9 (19.6)	−3.5 (25.7)	2.2 (36.0)	8.9 (48.0)	14.6 (58.3)	20.0 (68.0)	22.8 (73.0)	21.4 (70.5)	15.9 (60.6)	9.3 (48.7)	1.2 (34.2)	−4.8 (23.4)	8.4 (47.2)
Record low °C (°F)	−19.1 (−2.4)	−20.8 (−5.4)	−8.6 (16.5)	−2.2 (28.0)	3.8 (38.8)	10.1 (50.2)	16.6 (61.9)	12.7 (54.9)	4.0 (39.2)	−3.9 (25.0)	−14.7 (5.5)	−21.0 (−5.8)	−21.0 (−5.8)
Average precipitation mm (inches)	2.4 (0.09)	5.4 (0.21)	9.4 (0.37)	24.4 (0.96)	38.4 (1.51)	55.2 (2.17)	129.0 (5.08)	136.1 (5.36)	58.8 (2.31)	26.1 (1.03)	15.8 (0.62)	2.9 (0.11)	503.9 (19.82)
Average precipitation days (≥ 0.1 mm)	1.7	2.5	2.7	5.0	6.7	8.6	11.0	10.3	7.1	5.7	4.1	2.1	67.5
Average snowy days	2.7	2.7	1.2	0.2	0	0	0	0	0	0	1.4	2.5	10.7
Average relative humidity (%)	60	56	53	59	62	60	75	80	75	67	69	65	65
Mean monthly sunshine hours	132.7	152.9	200.4	221.3	248.6	219.9	180.8	185.8	184.3	174.6	146.1	142.7	2,190.1
Percentage possible sunshine	43	50	54	56	56	50	41	45	50	51	49	48	49
Source: China Meteorological Administration

== Transport ==
- G4 Beijing–Hong Kong and Macau Expressway
- China National Highway 107
