= Wancheng Township =

Coordinates: 37°37′38″N 114°31′57″E

Wancheng Township 万城乡
- Township

Chinese transcription(s)
- Interactive map of Wancheng Township
- Country: China
- Province: Hebei
- Prefecture: Shijiazhuang
- County: Gaoyi County
- Time zone: UTC+8 (China Standard Time)

Wancheng Township (Chinese: 万城乡) is a township-level division of Gaoyi County, Shijiazhuang, Hebei, China.

== See also ==
- List of township-level divisions of Hebei
