= Zhonghan Town =

Coordinates: 37°39′42″N 114°35′46″E

Zhonghan Town 中韩镇
- Township

Chinese transcription(s)
- Interactive map of Zhonghan Town
- Country: China
- Province: Hebei
- Prefecture: Shijiazhuang
- County: Gaoyi County
- Time zone: UTC+8 (China Standard Time)

Zhonghan Town (Chinese: 中韩镇) is a town of Gaoyi County, Shijiazhuang, Hebei, China. It was Zhonghan Township before January 2021.

== See also ==
- List of township-level divisions of Hebei
