= Zhuozhou East railway station =

Railway station in Zhuozhou, China

Zhuozhou East 涿州东
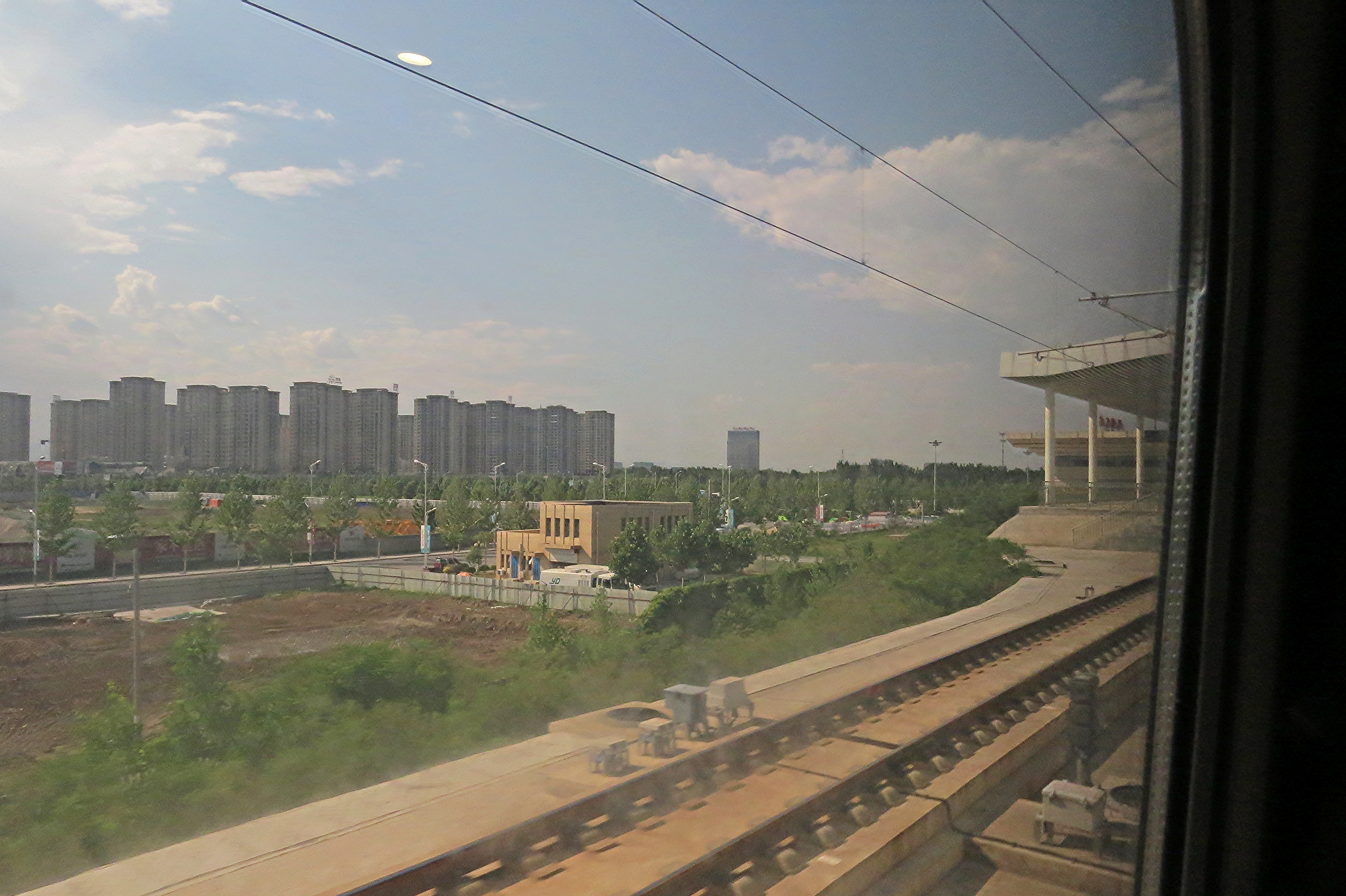

General information
- Location: Zhuozhou, Baoding, Hebei; China
- Coordinates: 39°27′37″N 116°03′13″E
- Operator: CR Beijing
- Line: Beijing–Shijiazhuang high-speed railway
- Platforms: 2
- Tracks: 4
- Connections: Bus terminal

Other information
- Status: Operational
- Station code: 22504 (TMIS code); ZAP (telegraph code); ZZD (Pinyin code)

History
- Opened: December 26, 2012

Services
Preceding station	China Railway High-speed	Following station
Beijing West Terminus	Beijing–Shijiazhuang high-speed railway	Gaobeidian East towards Shijiazhuang
Location
- Location within Hebei

Zhuozhou East railway station (simplified Chinese: 涿州东站; traditional Chinese: 涿州東站; pinyin: Zhuōzhōudōng Zhàn) is a railway station on the Beijing–Guangzhou–Shenzhen–Hong Kong high-speed railway located in Zhuozhou, Hebei, about 59 km (37 mi) away from Beijing West railway station. It opened with the Beijing–Zhengzhou section of the railway on 26 December 2012.
