= D-series trains =

Chinese railway train service category

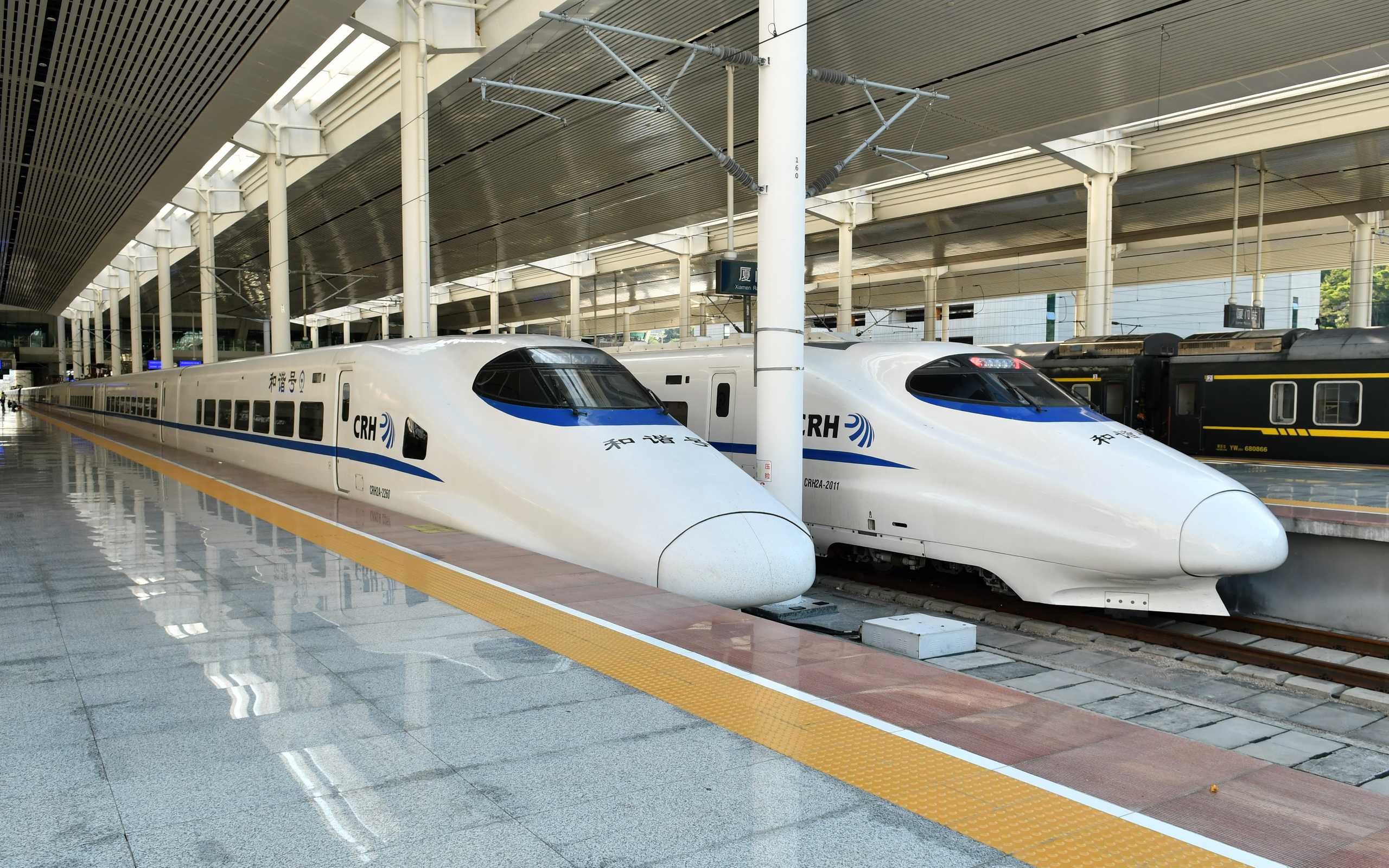
CRH2A-2260 and CRH2A-2011 at Xiamen railway station

D-series trains (simplified Chinese: 动车组列车; traditional Chinese: 動車組列車; pinyin: dòngchēzǔ lièchē; literally "EMU trains") are a category of passenger train service operated by China Railway. They are identified by train numbers beginning with the letter "D" and form part of the railway's electric multiple unit (EMU) service family, alongside G-series and C-series services. China Railway's 12306 ticketing service describes seat selection as available for C-, D-, and G-prefixed EMU trains.

In passenger usage, D-series services are generally the ordinary or lower-speed EMU category, with maximum operating speeds commonly described as 160–250 km/h (99–155 mph), while G-series services are normally high-speed EMU services at about 250–350 km/h (160–220 mph). D-series trains may operate on high-speed railways as well as conventional or upgraded lines. The category includes daytime seated EMU trains, overnight sleeper EMU trains in the D9xx number range, and lower-speed services using CR200J trainsets on conventional lines.

== Service category, rolling stock, and fares ==
The D prefix is a service category rather than a guarantee of a particular trainset model. China Railway's ticketing interface displays fares and seat classes by individual train, and notes that the displayed price is the actual discounted ticket price for reference while the current train model may change for dispatching or capacity reasons. Railway fare policy also distinguishes between published fares and actual executed fares for high-speed EMU services, which must be announced through online and station channels.

This separation between service prefix and trainset can result in D-series services being operated with equipment more commonly associated with G-series services. In February 2018, Shanghai Railway Group expanded its Fuxing services and listed Wuhu-Nanjing South D5644 among the newly added trains; the same report described Fuxing stock as China Standard EMUs developed for 350 km/h (220 mph) operation. A local report on the same service stated that the second-class fare for D5644 was unchanged and matched the fare of other D-prefixed CRH EMU services on the route. The service prefix and fare class therefore do not necessarily reveal the technical speed rating of the assigned trainset.

The reverse distinction also applies: a G-series train number does not imply that every section of a route is operated at the maximum speed associated with G services. Cross-boundary services to Hong Kong West Kowloon provide a visible example. The MTR describes the Hong Kong section of the Guangzhou-Shenzhen-Hong Kong Express Rail Link as operating at 200 km/h (120 mph), with trains reaching up to 350 km/h (220 mph) after entering the mainland section. MTR's short-haul timetable lists the cross-boundary high-speed services by train number, including G-prefixed services.

== Rolling stock ==
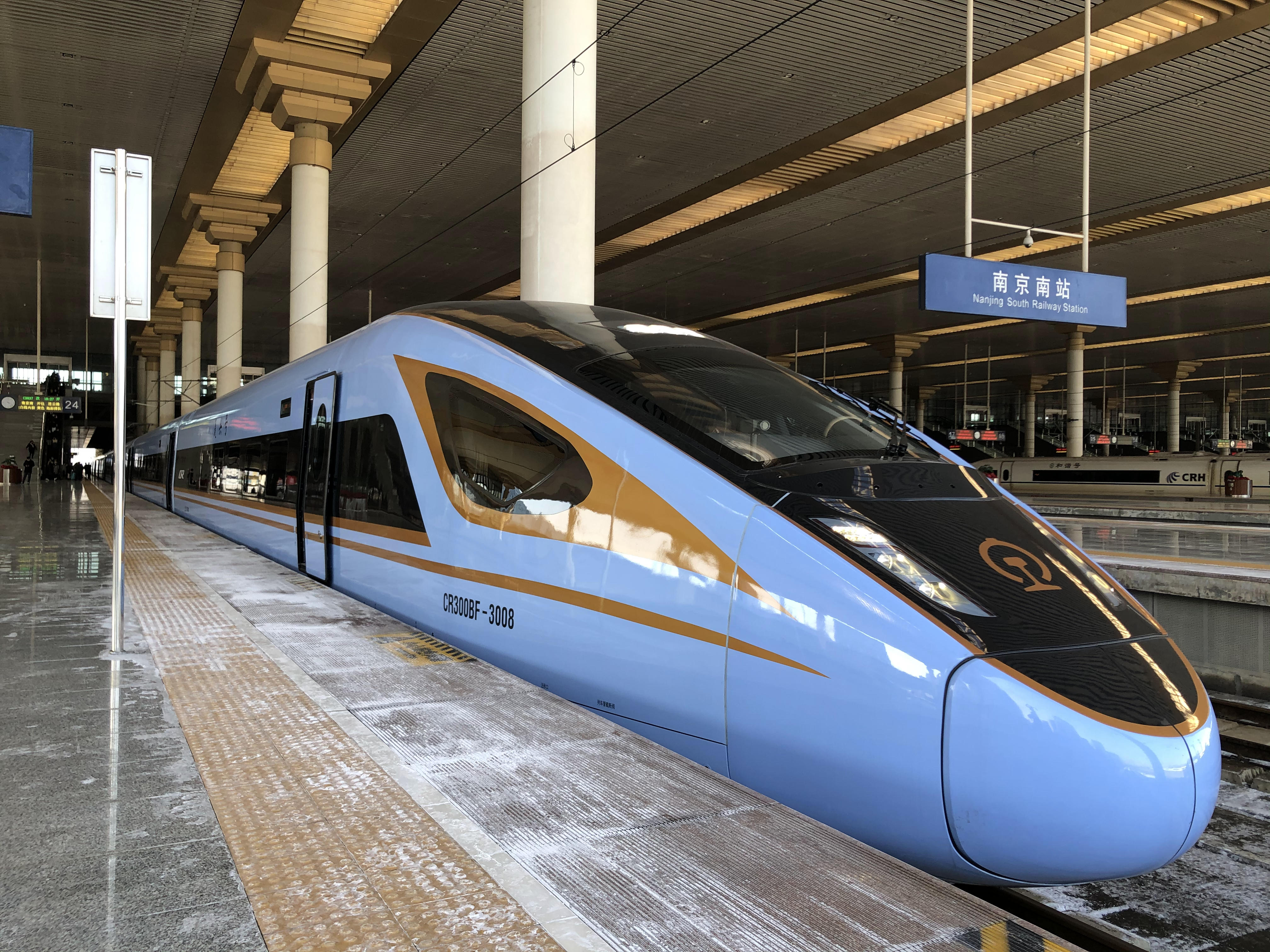
CR300BF stopped at Nanjing South railway station

D-series trains use EMUs from both the Hexie (CRH) and Fuxing (CR) families. Earlier 200-250 km/h EMUs included the CRH1, CRH2, and CRH5 types, while 300-350 km/h types included the CRH2-300, CRH3, and CRH380 series. The Fuxing family later expanded across 160 km/h (99 mph), 250 km/h (160 mph), and 350 km/h (220 mph) speed classes: Xinhua reported in 2020 that the CR300 entered use as a 250 km/h Fuxing type and that Fuxing EMUs from 160 to 350 km/h had all entered service. The CR400AF and CR400BF families are Fuxing models whose speed code indicates a test speed of at least 400 km/h (250 mph) and continuous operation at 350 km/h (220 mph).

Common or historically important trainsets include:

- CRH1
- CRH2
- CRH3A
- CRH5
- CR300 - a 250 km/h (160 mph) Fuxing EMU, divided into CR300AF and CR300BF variants.
- CR200J - a 160 km/h (99 mph) power-concentrated Fuxing EMU used on conventional and upgraded lines.
- CR400 - a 350 km/h (220 mph) Fuxing EMU normally associated with G-series services, but sometimes allocated to D-series services according to timetable and operational needs.

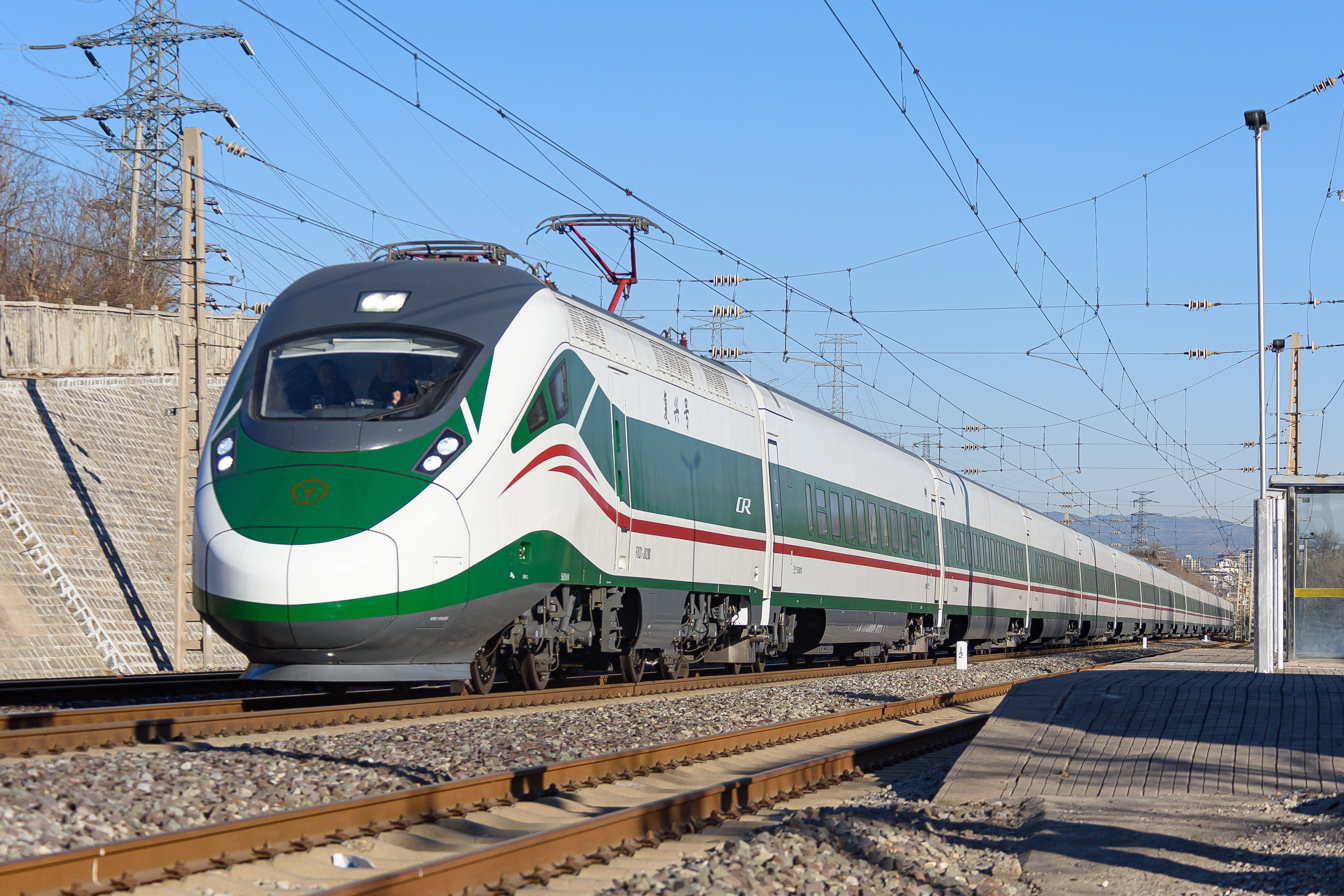
CR200J3-C passing through Houlvcun railway station

Passenger guides often describe D-series services as generally offering first- and second-class seating, while G-series services more often include business or premium-class options. Seat classes are nevertheless train-specific: 12306 lists multiple seat categories in its ticketing interface, and operators display the available inventory by train.
