= Baoding East railway station =

Railway station in Baoding, China

Baoding East 保定东
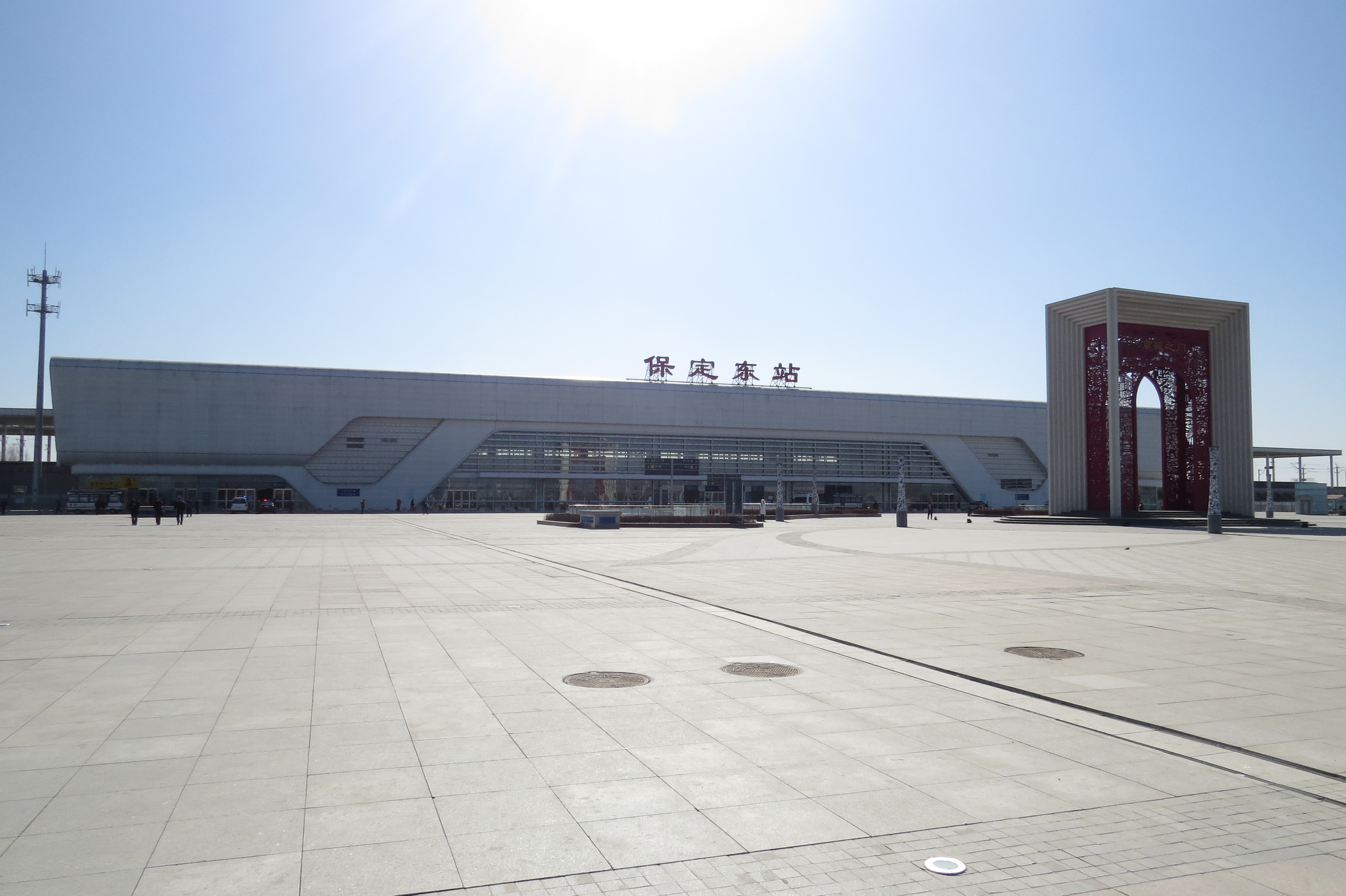
- Station building

General information
- Location: Qingyuan District, Baoding, Hebei; China
- Coordinates: 38°51′47.30″N 115°35′46.88″E
- Lines: Beijing–Shijiazhuang high-speed railway Xiong'an–Xinzhou high-speed railway (under construction)
- Platforms: 4
- Tracks: 6
- Connections: Bus terminal

Other information
- Status: Operational
- Station code: 22513 (TMIS code); BMP (telegraph code); BDD (Pinyin code)
- Classification: 1st class station

History
- Opened: December 26, 2012

Services
Preceding station	China Railway High-speed	Following station
Gaobeidian East towards Beijing West	Beijing–Shijiazhuang high-speed railway	Dingzhou East towards Shijiazhuang
Location
- Location within Hebei

Baoding East railway station is a railway station of Beijing–Guangzhou–Shenzhen–Hong Kong high-speed railway located in Baoding, Hebei Province, the People's Republic of China. It opened with the Beijing–Zhengzhou section of the railway on 26 December 2012.
