= Gaobeidian East railway station =

Railway station in Gaobeidian, Hebei, China

Gaobeidiandong 高碑店东
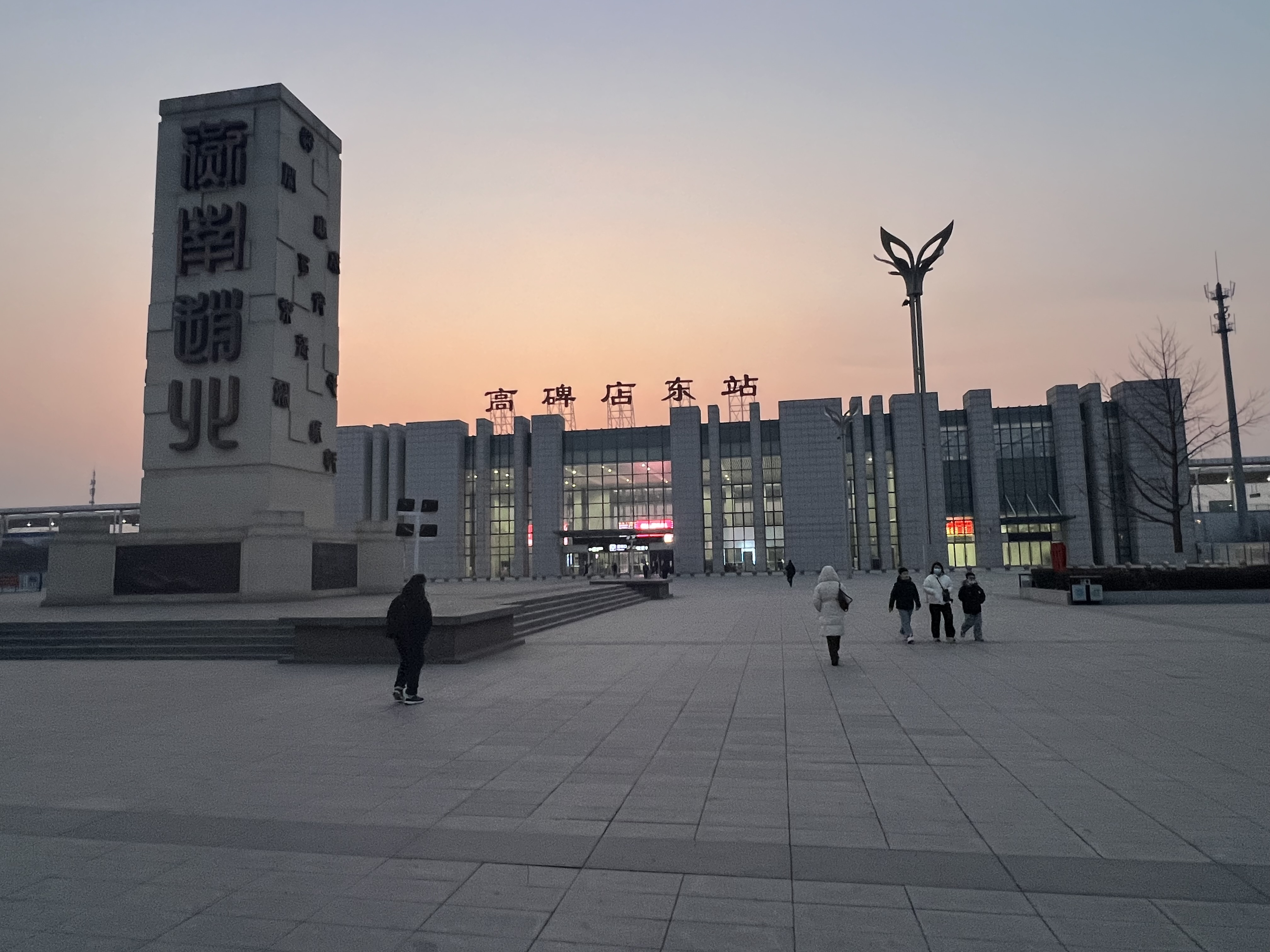
- The station in 2025.

General information
- Location: Gaobeidian, Baoding, Hebei; China
- Coordinates: 39°17′19″N 115°56′47″E
- Operator: CR Beijing
- Line: Beijing–Shijiazhuang high-speed railway
- Platforms: 2
- Tracks: 4
- Connections: Bus terminal

Other information
- Status: Operational
- Station code: 22507 (TMIS code); GMP (telegraph code); GBD (Pinyin code)

History
- Opened: December 26, 2012

Services
Preceding station	China Railway High-speed	Following station
Zhuozhou East towards Beijing West	Beijing–Shijiazhuang high-speed railway	Baoding East towards Shijiazhuang
Location
- Location within Hebei

Gaobeidian East railway station (simplified Chinese: 高碑店东站; traditional Chinese: 高碑店東站; pinyin: Gāobēidiàndōng Zhàn) is a railway station on the Beijing–Shijiazhuang high-speed railway located in Gaobeidian, Hebei. It opened with the railway on 26 December 2012. In the station forecourt, a monument bearing the travel slogan of Gaobeidian, "Yannan Zhaobei", literally translating to "South of Yan, North of Zhao", can be seen.
