= Daying, Gaoyi County =

Daying 大营镇
- Town
- Location in Hebei
- Coordinates: 37°36′02″N 114°39′12″E
- Country: People's Republic of China
- Province: Hebei
- Prefecture-level city: Shijiazhuang
- County: Gaoyi
- Village-level divisions: 25 villages
- Elevation: 48 m (157 ft)
- Time zone: UTC+8 (China Standard)
- Area code: 0311

Daying (simplified Chinese: 大营; traditional Chinese: 大營; pinyin: Dàyíng) is a town of Gaoyi County in southwestern Hebei province, China, located east of the county seat opposite G4 Beijing–Hong Kong and Macau Expressway. As of 2011, it has 25 villages under its administration.

== See also ==
- List of township-level divisions of Hebei
