= Handan East railway station =

Railway station in Handan, China

Handandong 邯郸东
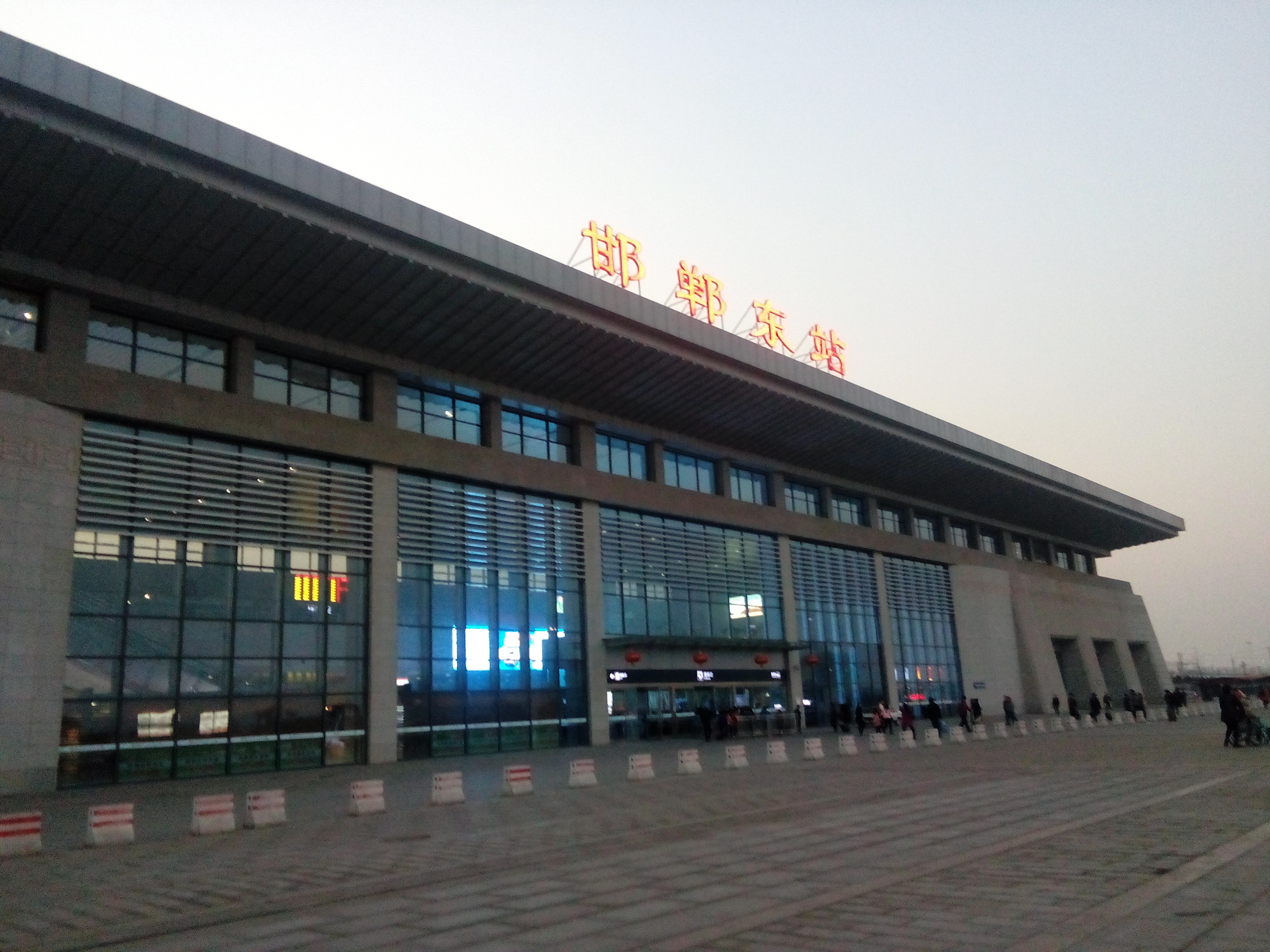
- The station building

General information
- Location: Congtai District, Handan, Hebei; China
- Coordinates: 36°37′11″N 114°33′33″E
- Operator: CR Beijing
- Line: Shijiazhuang–Wuhan High-Speed Railway
- Platforms: 5
- Tracks: 7
- Connections: Bus terminal

Other information
- Status: Operational
- Station code: 22528 (TMIS code); HPP (telegraph code); HDD (Pinyin code)

History
- Opened: December 26, 2012

Services
Preceding station	China Railway High-speed	Following station
Xingtai East towards Shijiazhuang	Shijiazhuang–Wuhan high-speed railway	Anyang East towards Wuhan
Location
- Location within Hebei

The Handan East railway station (simplified Chinese: 邯郸东站; traditional Chinese: 邯鄲東站; pinyin: Hándāndōng Zhàn) is a station on the Beijing–Guangzhou–Shenzhen–Hong Kong High-Speed Railway located in Handan, Hebei.

== History ==
The station was opened on 26 December 2012, together with the Beijing-Zhengzhou section of the Beijing–Guangzhou–Shenzhen–Hong Kong High-Speed Railway.
