= Fucun, Hebei =

Fucun 富村镇
- Town
- Location in Hebei
- Coordinates: 37°36′16″N 114°32′35″E
- Country: People's Republic of China
- Province: Hebei
- Prefecture-level city: Shijiazhuang
- County: Gaoyi
- Village-level divisions: 20 villages
- Elevation: 58 m (190 ft)
- Time zone: UTC+8 (China Standard)
- Area code: 0311

Fucun (Chinese: 富村; pinyin: Fùcūn) is a town of Gaoyi County in southwestern Hebei province, China, located 4 to 5 kilometres (2.5 to 3.1 mi) west of the county seat. As of 2011, it has 20 villages under its administration.

== See also ==
- List of township-level divisions of Hebei
