= Gaoyi West railway station =

Railway station in North China

Gaoyixi 高邑西
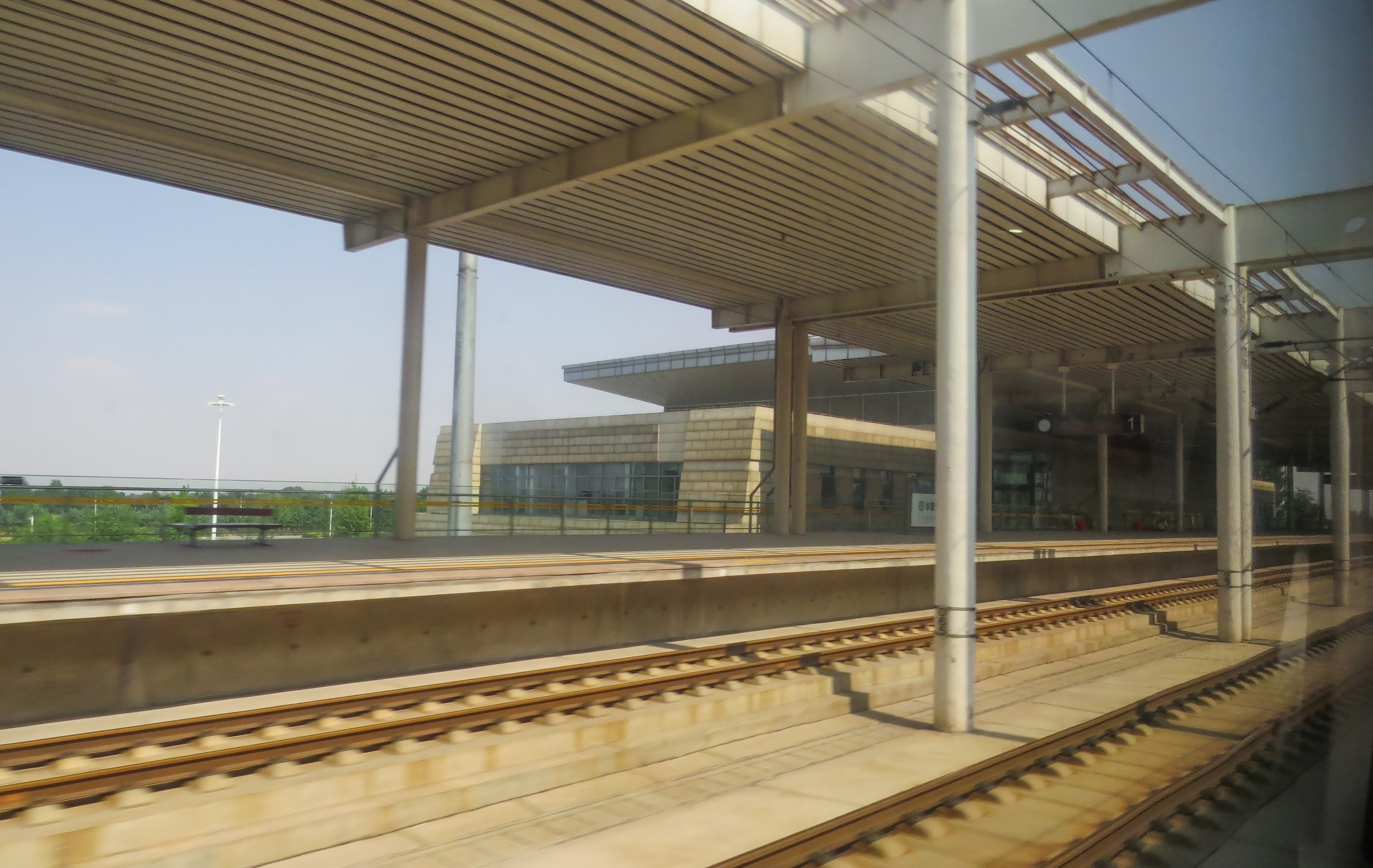

General information
- Location: Gaoyi County, Shijiazhuang, Hebei; China
- Coordinates: 37°37′47″N 114°31′50″E
- Operator: CR Beijing
- Line: Shijiazhuang–Wuhan High-Speed Railway
- Platforms: 2
- Tracks: 4

Other information
- Status: Operational
- Station code: 22522 (TMIS code); GNP (telegraph code); GYX (Pinyin code)

History
- Opened: December 26, 2012

Services
Preceding station	China Railway High-speed	Following station
Shijiazhuang Terminus	Shijiazhuang–Wuhan high-speed railway	Xingtai East towards Wuhan
Location
- Location within Hebei

The Gaoyixi (Gaoyi West) railway station (Chinese: 高邑西站; pinyin: Gāoyìxī Zhàn) is a high-speed railway station on the Beijing–Guangzhou–Shenzhen–Hong Kong High-Speed Railway located in Gaoyi County, Hebei. The station is 8 kilometres (5.0 mi) to the northwest of the town center of Gaoyi County. It opened with the Beijing-Zhengzhou section of the Beijing-Guangzhou high-speed railway on 26 December 2012.

== Station layout ==
The station has 2 side platforms and 4 tracks. The station building, covering an area of 5,000 square metres (54,000 sq ft), lies to the east of the platforms.
