= Xingtai East railway station =

Railway station in Xingtai, China

Xingtaidong 邢台东
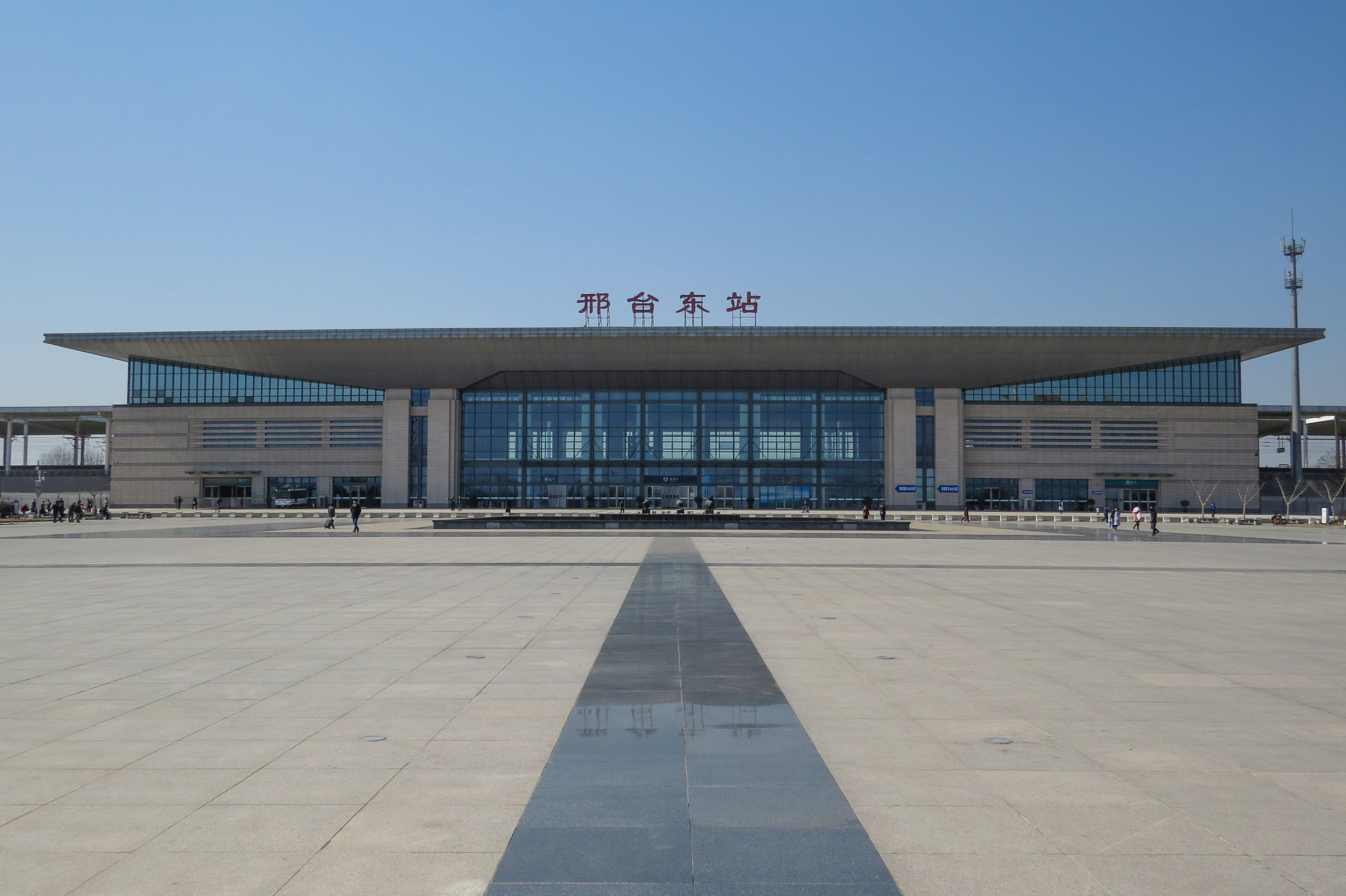
- Station building

General information
- Location: Zhucun, Xingtai County, Xingtai, Hebei; China
- Coordinates: 37°05′31″N 114°35′36″E
- Operator: CR Beijing
- Line: Shijiazhuang–Wuhan High-Speed Railway
- Platforms: 4
- Tracks: 6
- Connections: Bus terminal

Other information
- Status: Operational
- Station code: 22525 (TMIS code); EDP (telegraph code); XTD (Pinyin code)
- Classification: 1st class station

History
- Opened: December 26, 2012

Services
Preceding station	China Railway High-speed	Following station
Gaoyi West towards Shijiazhuang	Shijiazhuang–Wuhan high-speed railway	Handan East towards Wuhan
Location
- Location within Hebei

Xingtai East railway station (simplified Chinese: 邢台东站; traditional Chinese: 邢台東站; pinyin: Xíngtáidōng Zhàn) is a railway station on the Beijing–Guangzhou–Shenzhen–Hong Kong high-speed railway located in Xingtai County, Xingtai, Hebei.

== History ==
The station was opened on 26 December 2012, together with the Beijing-Zhengzhou section of the Beijing–Guangzhou–Shenzhen–Hong Kong high-speed railway.

== Station layout ==
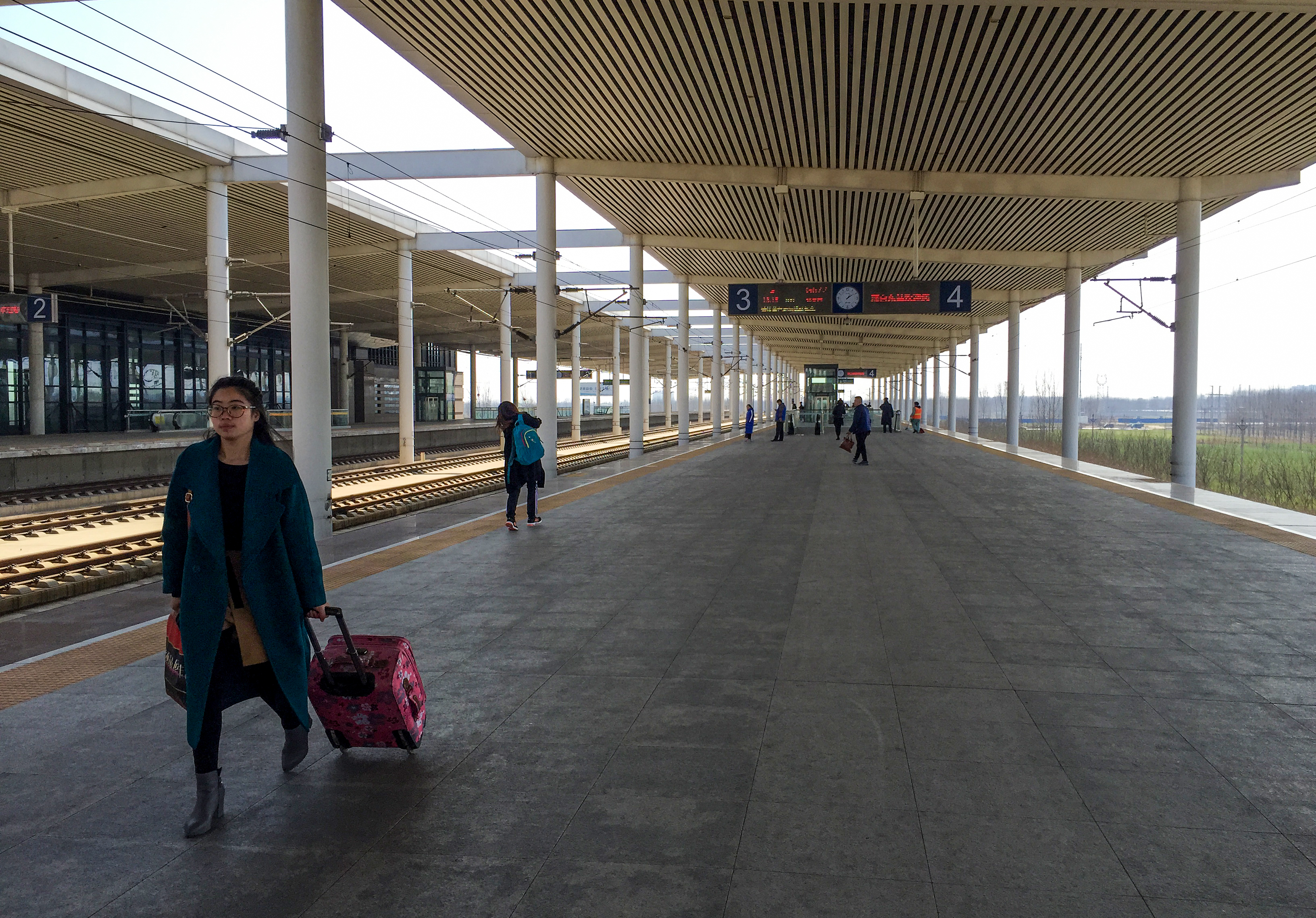
Platforms of the station

The station has 4 platforms (2 island platforms) and 6 tracks, of which 2 are through tracks. Platform 1 and 2 are for southbound trains and Platform 3 and 4 are for northbound trains. The station building is located to the east of the platforms.

== See also ==
- Xingtai railway station
