= Anyang East railway station =

Railway station in Anyang, China

Anyang East 安阳东
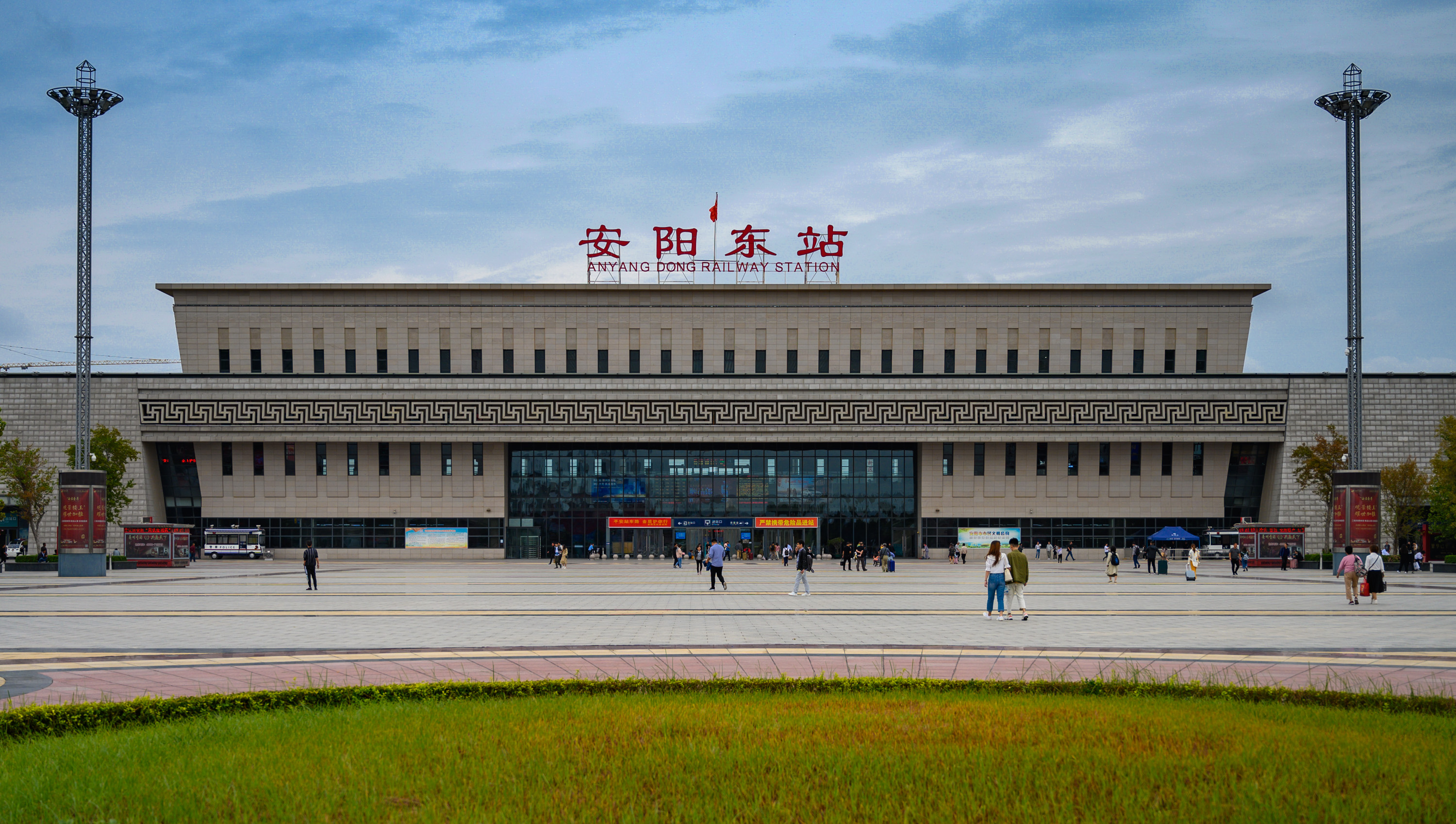
- Station building

General information
- Location: Anyang, Henan; China
- Coordinates: 36.083927°N 114.448108°E
- Operator: CR Zhengzhou
- Line: Beijing–Guangzhou high-speed railway
- Platforms: 5
- Tracks: 7
- Connections: Bus

Other information
- Station code: 22531 (TMIS code); ADF (telegraph code); AYD (Pinyin code)

History
- Opened: December 26, 2012

Services
Preceding station	China Railway High-speed	Following station
Handan East towards Shijiazhuang	Shijiazhuang–Wuhan high-speed railway	Hebi East towards Wuhan
Location

Anyang East railway station (Chinese: 安阳东站) is a railway station on the Beijing–Guangzhou high-speed railway that is located in Anyang, Henan, China. It opened with the Beijing–Zhengzhou section of the railway on 26 December 2012.
