= Xinxiang East railway station =

Railway station in Xinxiang, China

Xinxiang East 新乡东
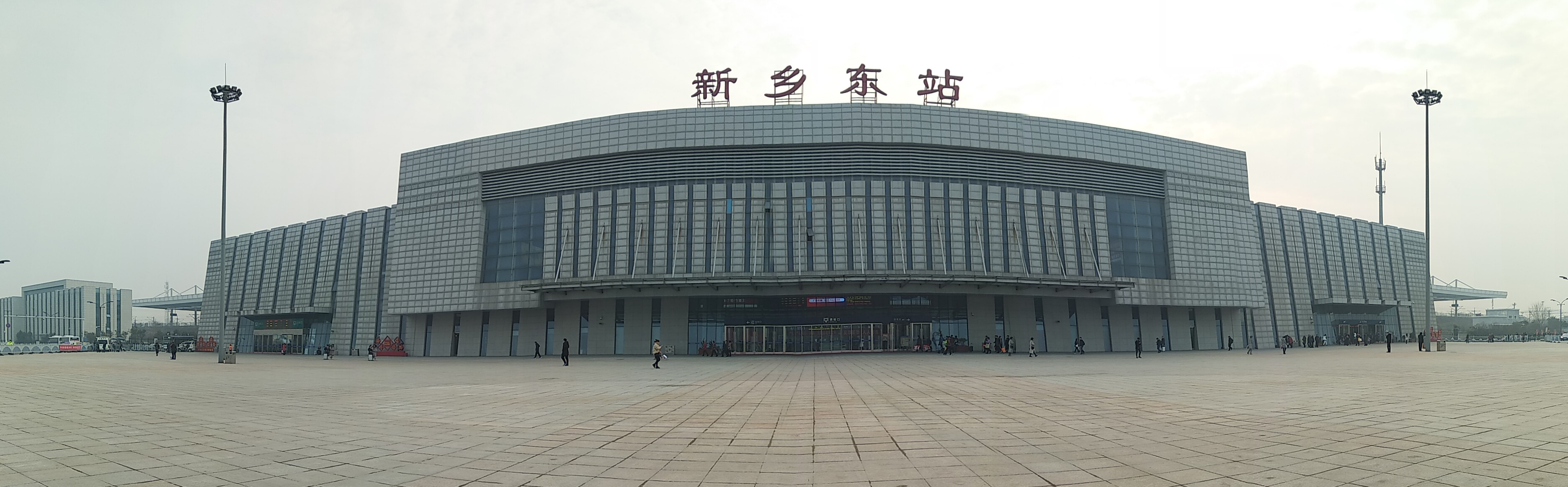
- Panoramic view of the station building

General information
- Other names: Xinxiang East
- Location: Muye District, Xinxiang, Henan; China
- Coordinates: 35.314487°N 113.973172°E
- Operated by: CR Zhengzhou
- Lines: Shijiazhuang–Wuhan high-speed railway Zhengzhou–Jinan high-speed railway
- Platforms: 5
- Tracks: 7
- Connections: Bus

Other information
- Station code: 22537 (TMIS code); EGF (telegraph code); XXD (Pinyin code)
- Classification: First Class station

History
- Opened: 26 December 2012

Services
Preceding station	China Railway High-speed	Following station
Hebi East towards Shijiazhuang	Shijiazhuang–Wuhan high-speed railway	Zhengzhou East towards Wuhan
Location

Xinxiang East railway station (Chinese: 新乡东站) is a railway station on the Beijing–Guangzhou–Shenzhen–Hong Kong high-speed railway located in Xinxiang, Henan, People's Republic of China. It opened with the Beijing–Zhengzhou section of the railway on 26 December 2012. In the future, it will be a stop on the Zhengzhou–Jinan high-speed railway.

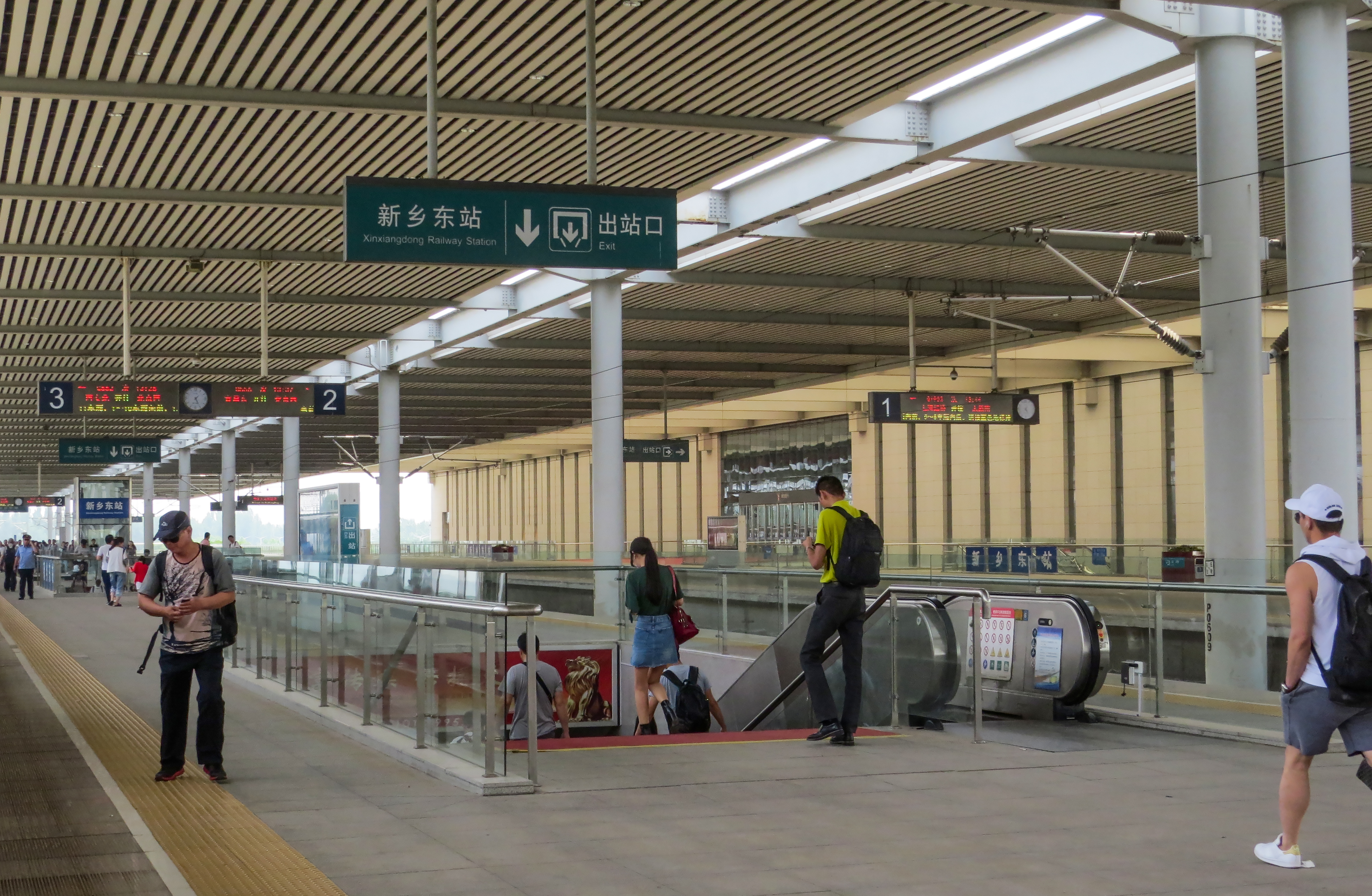
Platforms of the station
