= Shijiazhuang–Taiyuan railway =

Railway line in China

The Shijiazhuang–Taiyuan railway or Shitai railway (simplified Chinese: 石太铁路; traditional Chinese: 石太鐵路; pinyin: Shítài Tiělù), was known as Zhengding–Taiyuan railway or Zhengtai railway (正太鐵路) in the 1900s, is a railway between Shijiazhuang and Taiyuan, the provincial capitals, respectively, of Hebei and Shanxi provinces in northern China. The line is 242 km (150 mi) in length and was built from 1903 to 1907 by the American Schiff Co.

== See also ==
- Shijiazhuang–Taiyuan high-speed railway – new, much shorter railway between the same end points
