= Beijing–Shijiazhuang high-speed railway =

Railway line in China

Beijing–Guangzhou high-speed railway Beijing–Shijiazhuang section

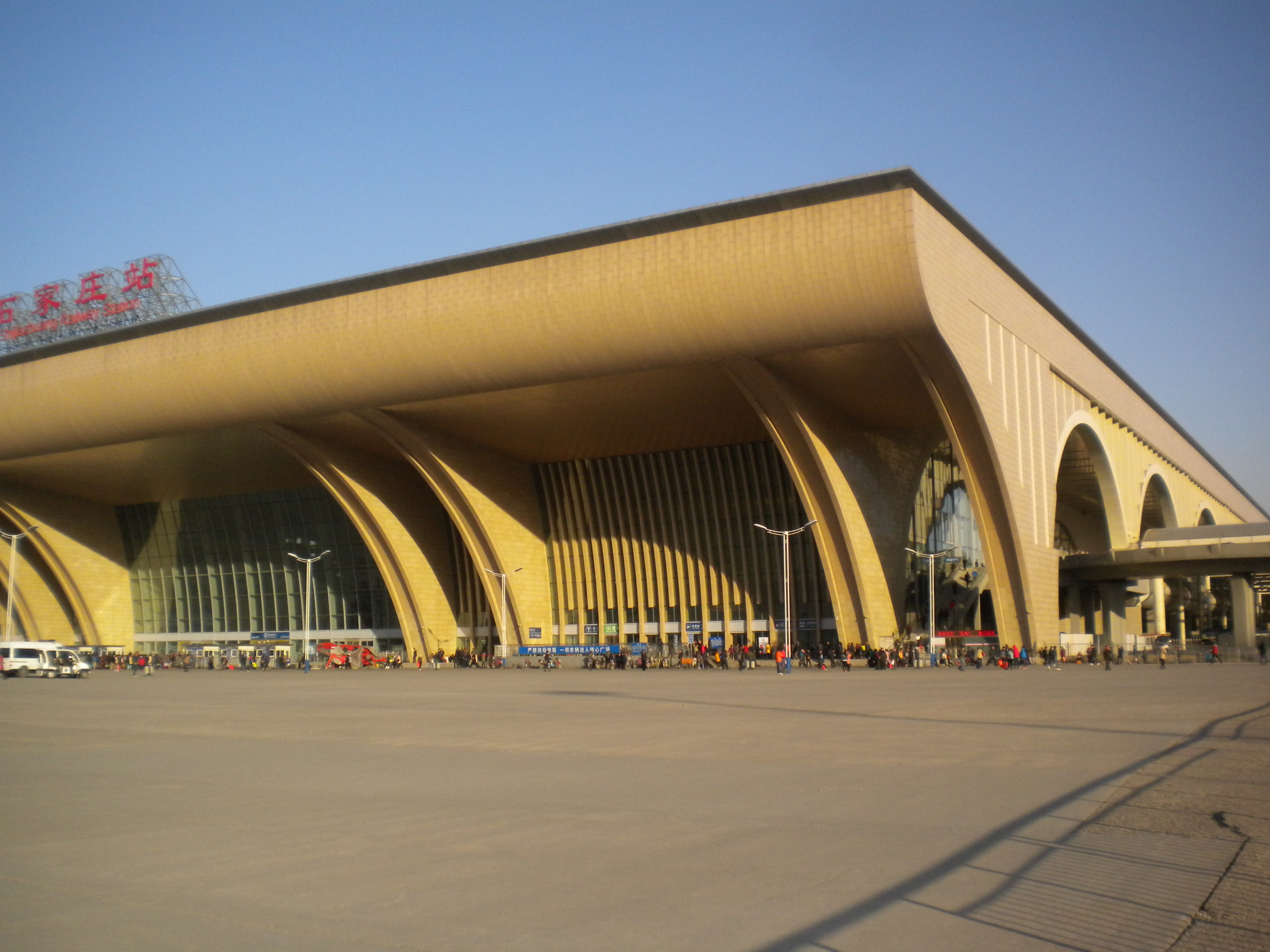
- New Shijiazhuang railway station

Overview
- Native name: 京广高速铁路京石段
- Status: Operational
- Owner: China Railway
- Locale: Beijing; Hebei province
- Termini: Beijing West; Shijiazhuang

Service
- Type: High-speed rail
- System: China Railway High-speed
- Operator(s): CR Beijing

History
- Opened: December 26, 2012

Technical
- Number of tracks: 2 (Double-track)
- Track gauge: 1,435 mm (4 ft 8 1/2 in) standard gauge
- Minimum radius: generally 9,000 m (5.6 mi) or 7,000 m (4.3 mi) on difficult sections
- Electrification: 25 kV 50 Hz AC (Overhead line)
- Operating speed: 300 kilometres per hour (190 mph) (initial operations); 310 kilometres per hour (190 mph) (with ATP); 350 kilometres per hour (220 mph) (design)
- Signalling: ABS
- Maximum incline: generally 1.2% or 2% on difficult sections

Beijing–Shijiazhuang high-speed railway (simplified Chinese: 京石客运专线; traditional Chinese: 京石客運專線; pinyin: Jīng-Shí Kèyùn Zhuān Xiàn) is a 281-kilometre high-speed rail line operated by China Railway High-speed between Beijing and Shijiazhuang (the provincial capital of Hebei) that opened on 26 December 2012 after 4 years of construction. The total investment is 43.87 billion yuan. The design speed is 350 km/h (220 mph), and the opening cut travel times between Beijing and Shijiazhuang from 2 hours to about 1 hour. This railway is the northern section of the 2,100 km (1,300 mi) Beijing–Guangzhou high-speed railway (Jinggang line) connecting Beijing and Guangzhou, but also speeds up trains between Beijing and Taiyuan, which continue on the Shitai passenger railway.
