= Shijiazhuang railway station =

Railway station in Shijiazhuang, China

Shijiazhuang 石家庄
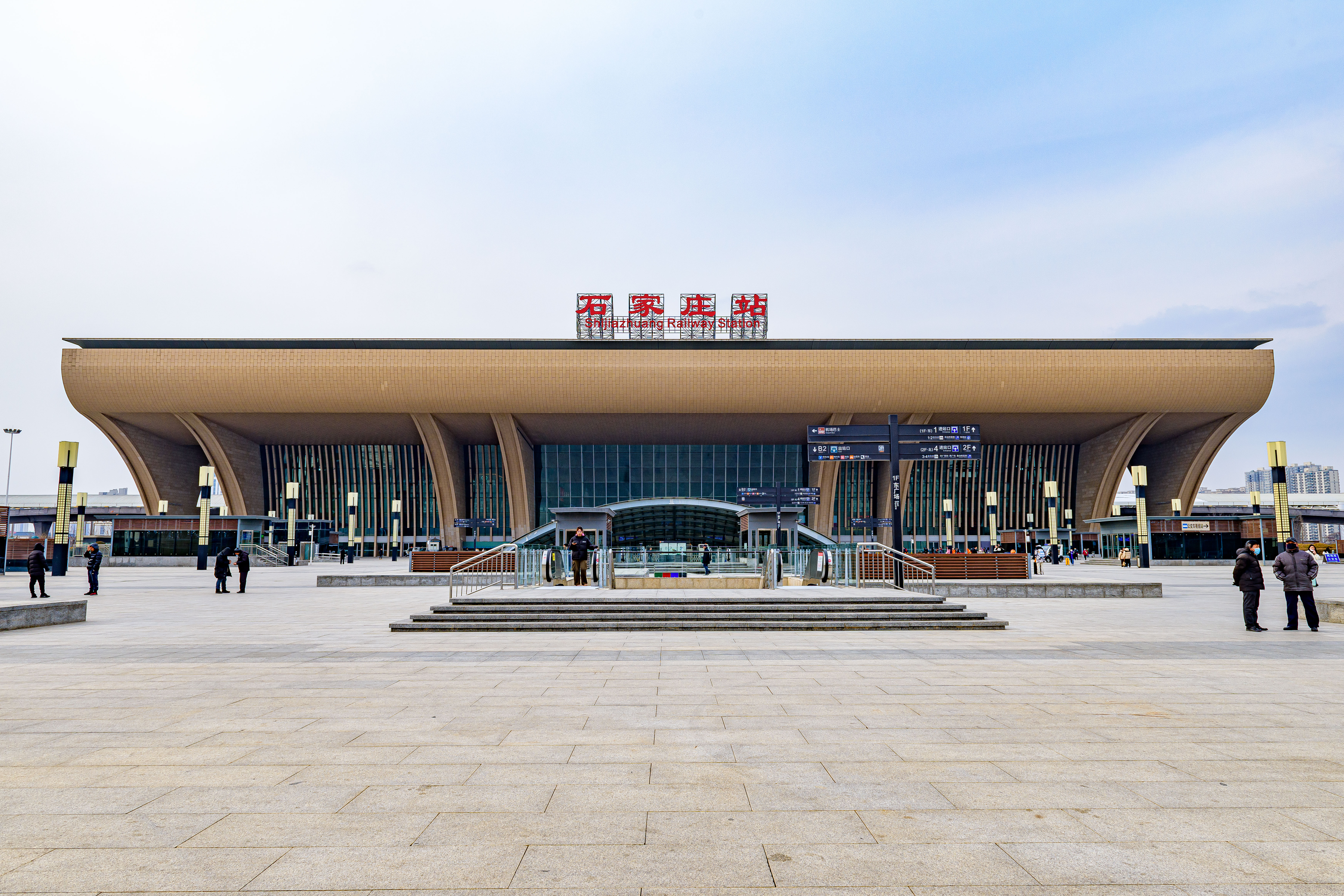
- New Shijiazhuang railway station, which was completed in 2012.

Chinese name
- Simplified Chinese: 石家庄站
Transcriptions
Standard Mandarin
- Hanyu Pinyin: Shíjiāzhuāng zhàn

General information
- Location: Zhanqian Road; Qiaoxi District, Shijiazhuang, Hebei; China
- Coordinates: 38°00′35.0″N 114°28′42.6″E
- Operator: CR Beijing
- Lines: Beijing–Guangzhou railway; Shijiazhuang–Dezhou railway; Shijiazhuang–Taiyuan railway; Shijiazhuang–Taiyuan high-speed railway; Beijing–Guangzhou high-speed railway
- Platforms: 24
- Connections: Bus terminal; Shijiazhuangzhan station

Other information
- Station code: 20372 (TMIS code); SJP (telegraph code); SJZ (Pinyin code)
- Classification: Top Class station (特等站)

History
- Opened: 1903; 123 years ago (former), 2012; 14 years ago (current)
- Closed: 2012; 14 years ago (former)

Services
Preceding station	China Railway	Following station
Zhengding towards Beijing West	Beijing–Guangzhou railway	Yuanshi towards Guangzhou
Beijing West Terminus	Beijing–Nanning–Hanoi	Zhengzhou towards Gia Lâm
Preceding station	China Railway High-speed	Following station
Zhengding Airport towards Beijing West	Beijing–Shijiazhuang high-speed railway	Terminus
Terminus	Shijiazhuang–Wuhan high-speed railway	Gaoyi West towards Wuhan
Location
- Location within Shijiazhuang Location within Hebei Location within China

Shijiazhuang railway station (simplified Chinese: 石家庄站; traditional Chinese: 石家莊站; pinyin: Shíjiāzhuāng zhàn) is the railway station of Shijiazhuang, the capital of Hebei Province, China, on the main Beijing-Guangzhou rail corridor. The current station opened in 2012; it is one of the few stations that serves both the "conventional" Beijing–Guangzhou railway and the Beijing–Guangzhou high-speed railway.

Besides trains running along the two north-south Beijing-Guangzhou lines, Shijiazhuang railway station is also served by trains going east or west, along the Qingdao-Jinan-Dezhou-Shijiazhuang-Taiyuan corridor, which includes both a conventional railway and the Shijiazhuang–Taiyuan high-speed railway. Some of the trains on the east-west corridor do not stop at Shijiazhuang railway station, bypassing it and stopping at the smaller Shijiazhuang North railway station.

In 2013, a typical daily schedule listed 265 trains originating, terminating, or passing through Shijiazhuang railway station.

Shijiazhuang railway station is by far the busiest train station in Hebei's capital region. From December 31, 2012 through January 3, 2013, 198,000 passengers departed from this station, out of the 279,000 from all stations of Greater Shijiazhuang.

== History ==
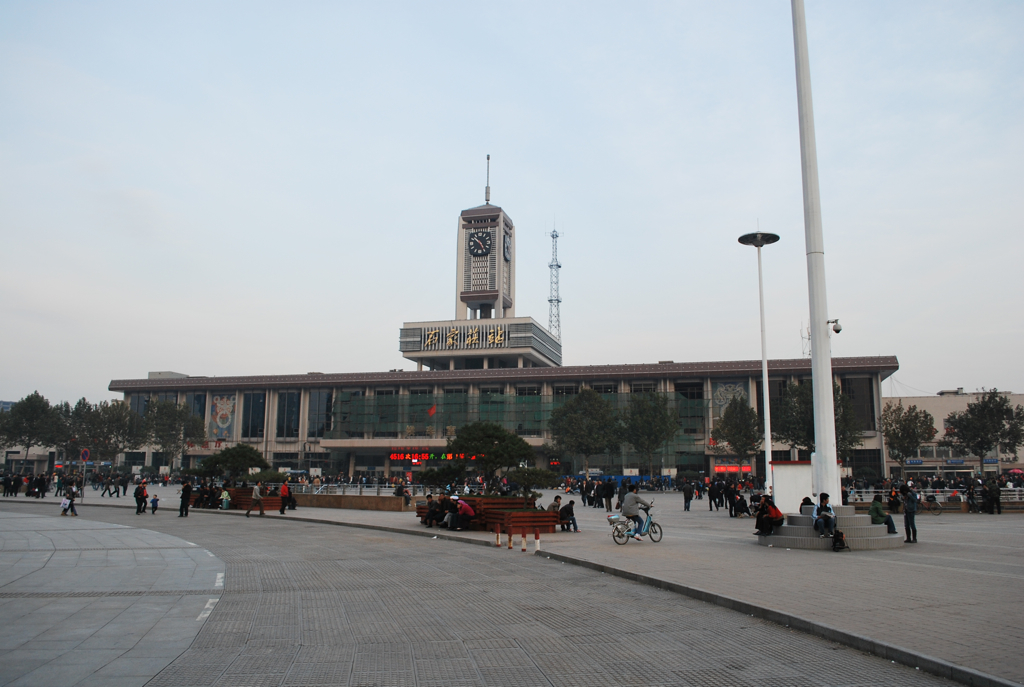
Shijiazhuang railway station (1987-2012)

The first railway station at what was to become the city of Shijiazhuang opened in 1903.

Between 1987 and 2012, the name "Shijiazhuang railway station" was applied to the facility located in downtown Shijiazhuang, at 38°2′27″N 114°29′3″E. Administratively, the site is in the city's Qiaoxi District, on the border with Qiaodong District. (The border between the two districts runs along the railway). This station was closed on December 20, 2012, simultaneously with the opening of the new Shijiazhuang railway station. (See 石家庄站 (1987－2012年))

The construction of the present-day Shijiazhuang railway station started in June 2010.; it was opened on December 21, 2012, just in time for the opening of the Beijing–Shijiazhuang and Shijiazhuang–Zhengzhou sections of the Beijing–Guangzhou high-speed railway.

To avoid confusion between the pre- and post-2012 stations of the same name, they are sometimes referred to as the "Old (老) Shijiazhuang Station" and the "New (新) Shijiazhuang Station".

Unlike most other cities along the Beijing–Guangzhou High-Speed Railway, where the high-speed line is routed away from city centers, and high-speed train stations are separate (and, usually, quite distant) from the cities' conventional railway stations, in Shijiazhuang a decision was made to construct a common station for the high-speed and conventional rail lines. This required extensive tunneling, with a 5-km long 6-track tunnel constructed under the city. This was the first time tunneling (instead of e.g. constructing an elevated line) was used to run a high-speed railway through a city in China.

The new Shijiazhuang railway station is located about 3 km south of the old station, just within the city's Second Ring Road (南二环). This site is also near the border of Qiaoxi and Qiaodong Districts.

The stations is currently served by the Shijiazhuang Metro Line 2 and Line 3.

Since 2020, the Shijiazhuang-Hengshui-Cangzhou-Huanghua Port Intercity Railway, a new high speed railway terminating at Shijiazhuang station is being constructed.
