= Beijing–Kunming high-speed train =

Railway service in China

Beijing–Kunming high-speed train 京昆高速动车组列车
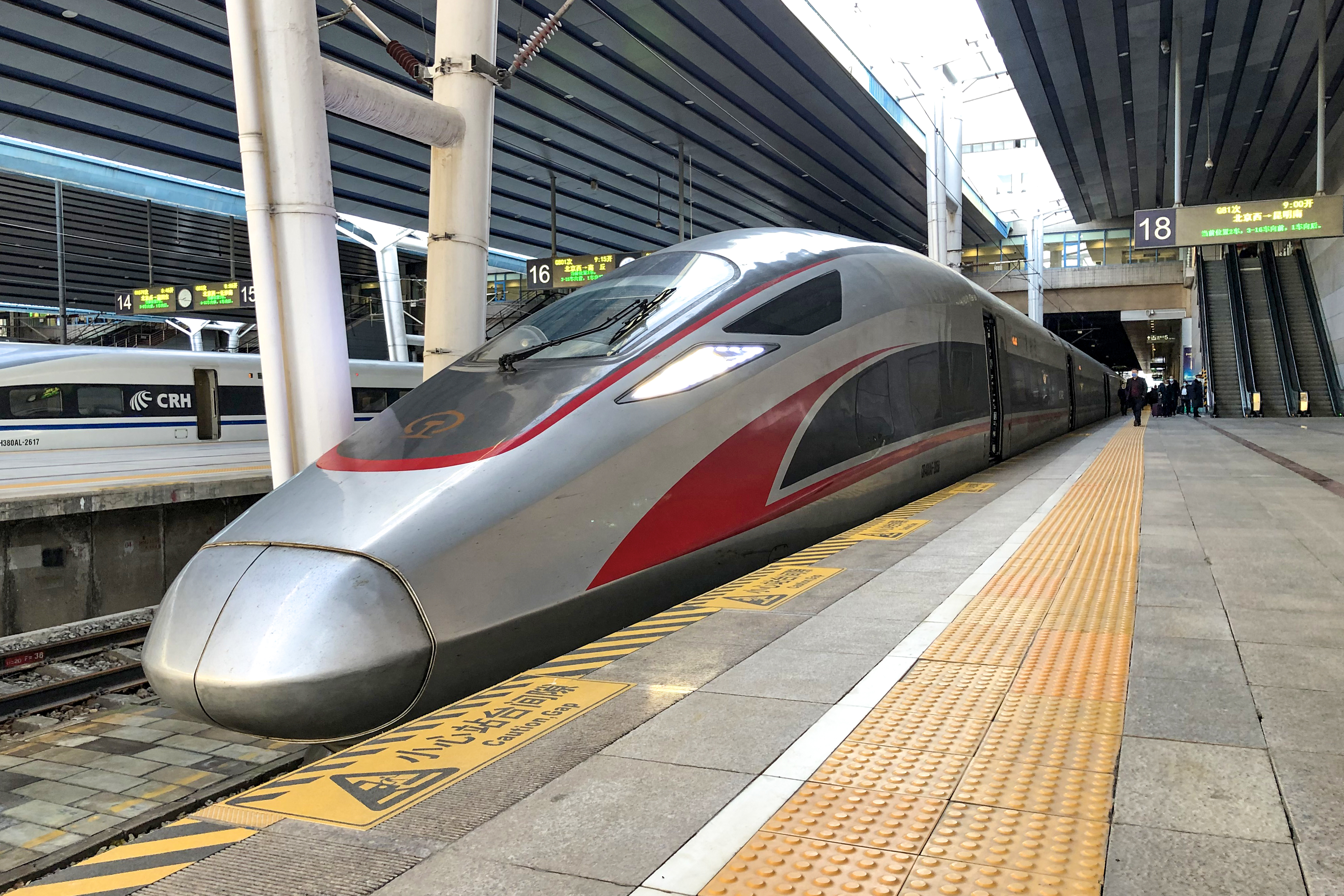
- A CR400AF EMU on G81 service awaiting departure at Beijing West railway station in December 2020

Overview
- Service type: G-series trains
- Status: Operational
- Locale: China
- First service: 5 January 2017
- Current operator(s): CR Beijing; CR Kunming

Route
- Termini: Beijing West; Kunming South
- Distance travelled: 2,760 kilometres (1,710 mi)
- Average journey time: 10h 20m – 13h 09m
- Service frequency: 6 daily
- Train number(s): G71 and G401 (Beijing West → Kunming South); G72 and G402 (Kunming South → Beijing West)
- Line(s) used: Beijing–Guangzhou–Shenzhen–Hong Kong HSR and Shanghai–Kunming HSR

On-board services
- Class(es): Business seat; First class seat; Second class seat
- Catering facilities: Dining car; Trolley refreshment service

Technical
- Rolling stock: CRH380AL, CRH380A, CR400AF
- Track gauge: 1,435 mm (4 ft 8 1/2 in)
- Operating speed: 350 km/h (220 mph) (Beijing - Wuhan); 300 km/h (190 mph) (Wuhan - Kunming)
- Track owner(s): China Railway

The Beijing–Kunming high-speed train (京昆高速动车组列车) are high-speed train services between Beijing and Kunming, the capital of Yunnan Province. Two pairs of trains are operated daily by CR Beijing and CR Kunming, with train numbers designated as G71/G72, G401/402.

With a travelling distance of 2,760 kilometres (1,710 mi), the services on this route have the longest distance among the high-speed train services in the world as of 2018.

== History ==
The high-speed trains between Beijing and Kunming began operations on 1 January 2017, with the completion of the Shanghai–Kunming HSR. The two pairs of trains were both extensions from other services. The former G401/404 trains (Beijing West-Guiyang North) and the former G1566/1565 trains (Beijing West-Zhengzhou East) were extended to Kunming South and had their train numbers changed to G403/404 and G405/406 respectively. With the opening of high-speed train services, the travelling time by train between Beijing and Kunming was shortened from over 33 hours to 12 hours.

== Operations ==
The G403/404 trains only have six intermediate stops and are the fastest train services on this route, with a travelling time of 10 hours 43 minutes. The trains are also called as the "benchmark trains" (Chinese: 标杆车).

- ●: stop at the station
- ↓ or ↑: pass the station
- : Benchmark train

G403	G71	G405	Stops	G404	G402	G406
●	●	●	Beijing West	●	●	●
↓	↓	↓	Baoding East	↑	●	↑
●	●	●	Shijiazhuang	●	●	●
↓	↓	●	Gaoyi West	↑	●	↑
↓	↓	●	Handan East	↑	●	↑
↓	↓	●	Anyang East	↑	●	↑
↓	↓	↓	Xinxiang East	↑	●	↑
●	●	●	Zhengzhou East	●	●	●
↓	↓	↓	Luohe West	↑	●	↑
↓	↓	↓	Zhumadian West	↑	●	↑
↓	↓	●	Xinyang East	↑	●	↑
●	●	●	Wuhan	●	●	●
↓	↓	↓	Chibi North	↑	●	↑
↓	↓	↓	Yueyang East	↑	↑	●
●	●	●	Changsha South	●	●	●
↓	↓	↓	Xiangtan North	↑	●	↑
↓	↓	●	Shaoshan South	↑	●	↑
↓	↓	●	Loudi South	↑	●	↑
↓	↓	↓	Shaoyang North	↑	↑	●
↓	↓	●	Xinhua South	↑	↑	●
●	●	●	Huaihua South	●	●	●
↓	↓	↓	Zhijiang	↑	●	●
↓	↓	●	Tongren South	↑	●	↑
↓	↓	↓	Sansui	↑	↑	●
↓	↓	●	Kaili South	↑	●	●
↓	↓	↓	Guiding North	↑	↑	●
●	●	●	Guiyang North	●	●	●
↓	●	●	Anshun West	↑	●	●
↓	●	↓	Panzhou	↑	●	●
↓	●	●	Qujing North	↑	●	●
●	●	●	Kunming South	●	●	●

== Train formation ==
The G71/402 trains are operated by 8-car CR400AF trainsets staffed by CR Beijing, the capacity being 576 (1152 if double-headed).

Car No.	1	2-3	4	5	6-7	8	9	10-11	12	13	14-15	16
Type	ZYS; Business/First class	ZE; Second class	ZE; Second class	ZEC; Second class/Dining car	ZE; Second class	ZES; Business/Second class	ZYS; Business/First class	ZE; Second class	ZE; Second class	ZEC; Second class/Dining car	ZE; Second class	ZES; Business/Second class

The G403/406 trains are operated by 8-car CRH380A trainsets staffed by CR Kunming, the capacity being 556 (1112 if double-headed).

Car No.	1	2-3	4	5	6-7	8	9	10-11	12	13	14-15	16
Type	ZYS; Business/First class	ZE; Second class	ZE; Second class	ZEC; Second class/Dining car	ZE; Second class	ZES; Business/Second class	ZYS; Business/First class	ZE; Second class	ZE; Second class	ZEC; Second class/Dining car	ZE; Second class	ZES; Business/Second class

The G405/404 trains are operated by 16-car CRH380AL trainsets staffed by CR Beijing, the capacity being 1028.

Car No.	1	2	3	4	5	6-8	9	10-15	16
Type	ZYS; Business/First class	ZY; First class	SW; Business	ZY; First class	ZE; Second class	ZE; Second class	CA; Dining car	ZE; Second class	ZYS; Business/First class
