= Xiaogan North railway station =

Railway station in Xiaogan, China

Xiaogan North 孝感北
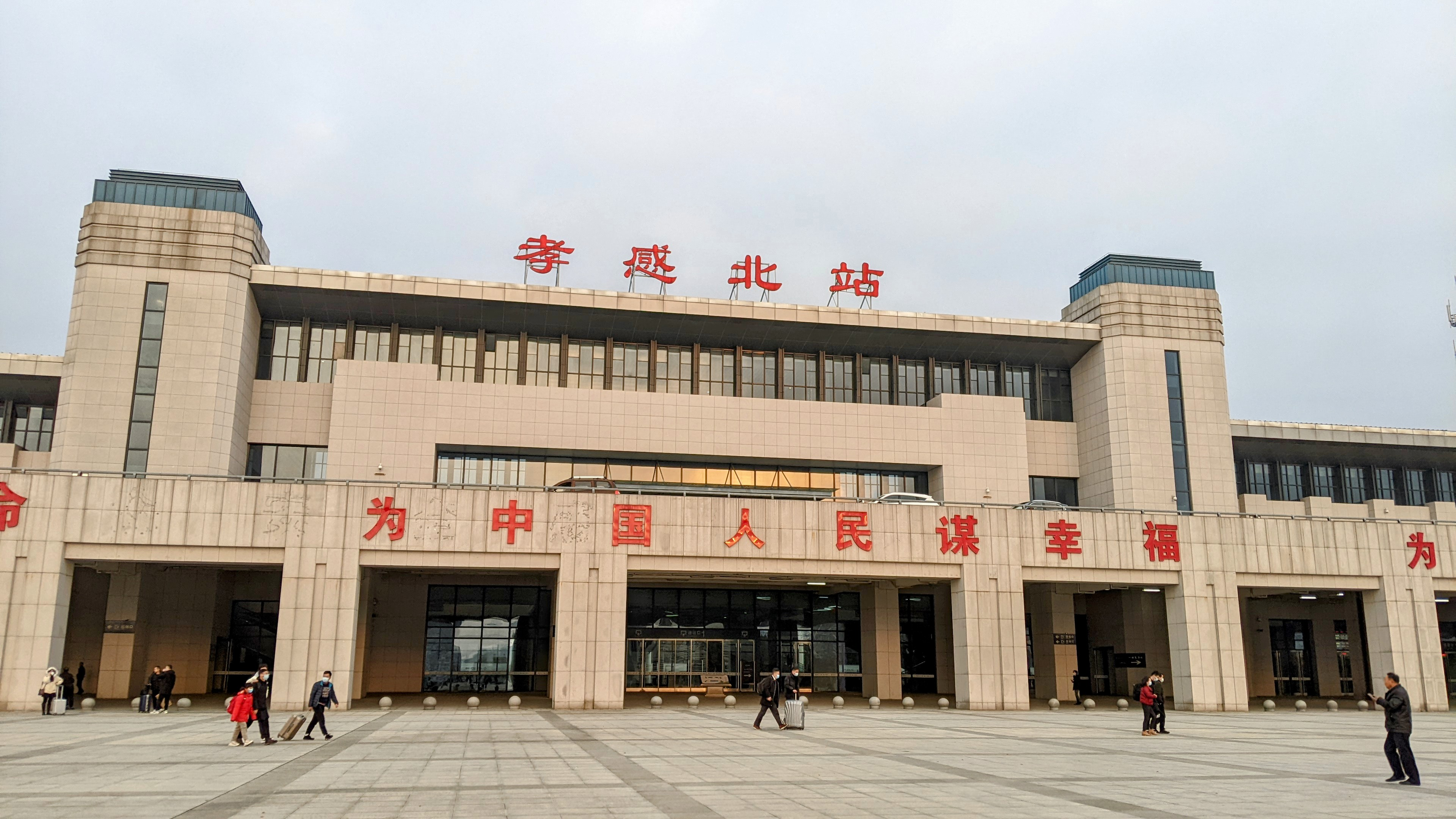
- Station Building

General information
- Other names: Xiaoganbei
- Location: Dawu County, Xiaogan, Hubei Province; China
- Operator: CR Wuhan
- Line: Shijiazhuang–Wuhan High-Speed Railway
- Platforms: 2 island platforms
- Connections: Bus

Other information
- Station code: 65794 (TMIS code); XJN (telegraph code); XGB (Pinyin code)

History
- Opened: 28 September 2012

Services
Preceding station	China Railway High-speed	Following station
Xinyang East towards Shijiazhuang	Shijiazhuang–Wuhan high-speed railway	Hengdian East towards Wuhan
Location

Xiaogan North railway station is a railway station located in Dawu County, Xiaogan, Hubei Province, China. Despite its name, the station is located in Dawu County, almost 100 km away from downtown Xiaogan. It serves the Shijiazhuang–Wuhan high-speed railway, a segment of the Harbin–Hong Kong (Macau) corridor, and the Beijing-Guangzhou-Shenzhen-Hong Kong High-Speed Railway. It was opened on 28 September 2012.
