= Xuchang East railway station =

Railway station in Xuchang, China

Xuchangdong 许昌东
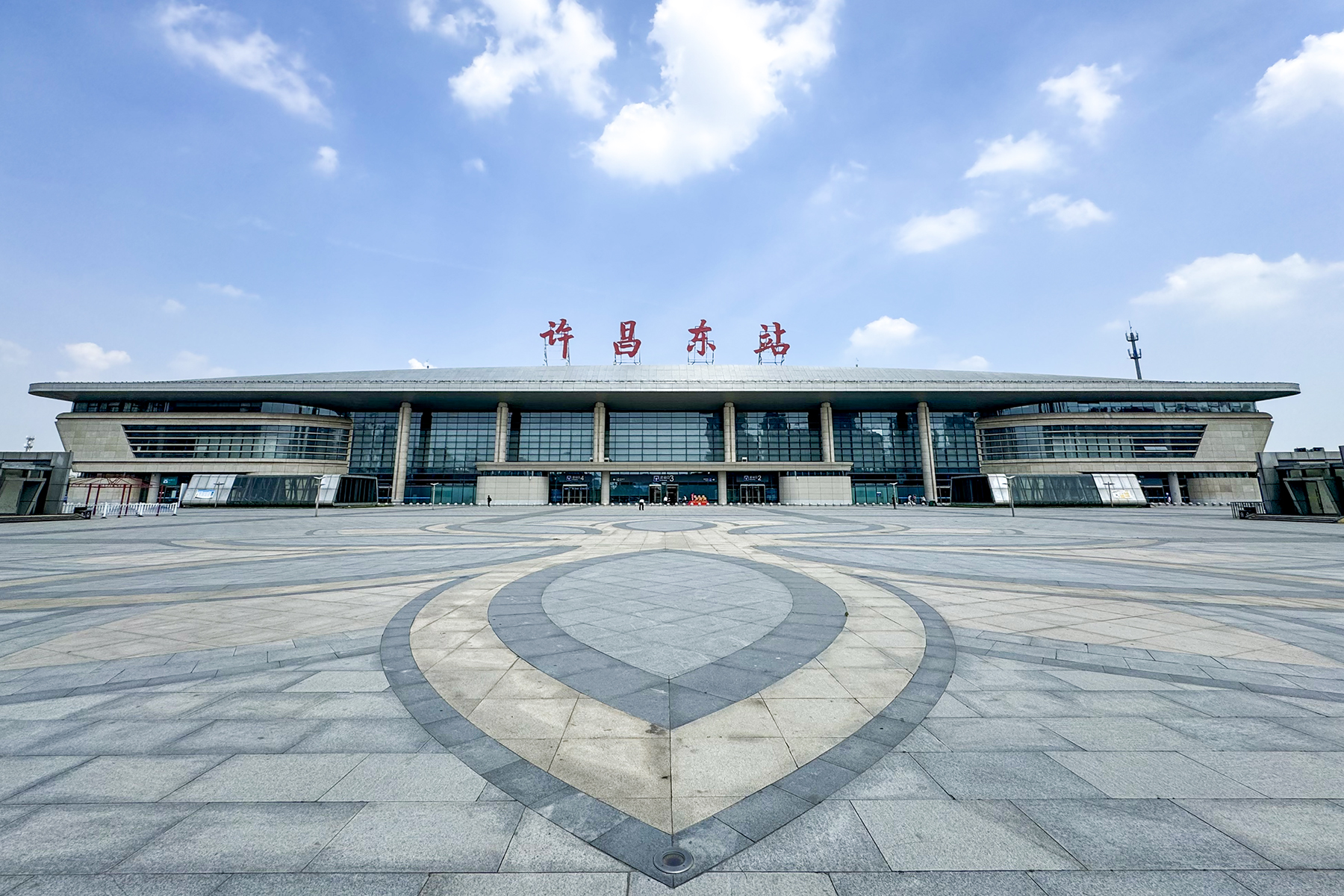

General information
- Other names: Xuchang East
- Location: Jian'an District, Xuchang, Henan; China
- Coordinates: 34.0500°N 113.8819°E
- Operator: CR Zhengzhou
- Line: Shijiazhuang–Wuhan high-speed railway
- Platforms: 3 (1 island platform, 1 side platform)
- Tracks: 5
- Connections: Bus terminal

Other information
- Station code: 65779 (TMIS code); XVF (telegraph code); XCD (Pinyin code)
- Classification: First Class station

History
- Opened: 28 September 2012

Services
Preceding station	China Railway High-speed	Following station
Zhengzhou East towards Shijiazhuang	Shijiazhuang–Wuhan high-speed railway	Luohe West towards Wuhan
Location

The Xuchang East railway station (Chinese: 许昌东站) is a railway station of the Beijing–Guangzhou–Shenzhen–Hong Kong High-Speed Railway located in east area of Xuchang, Henan, China.

== Metro station ==
Xuchangdong 许昌东站
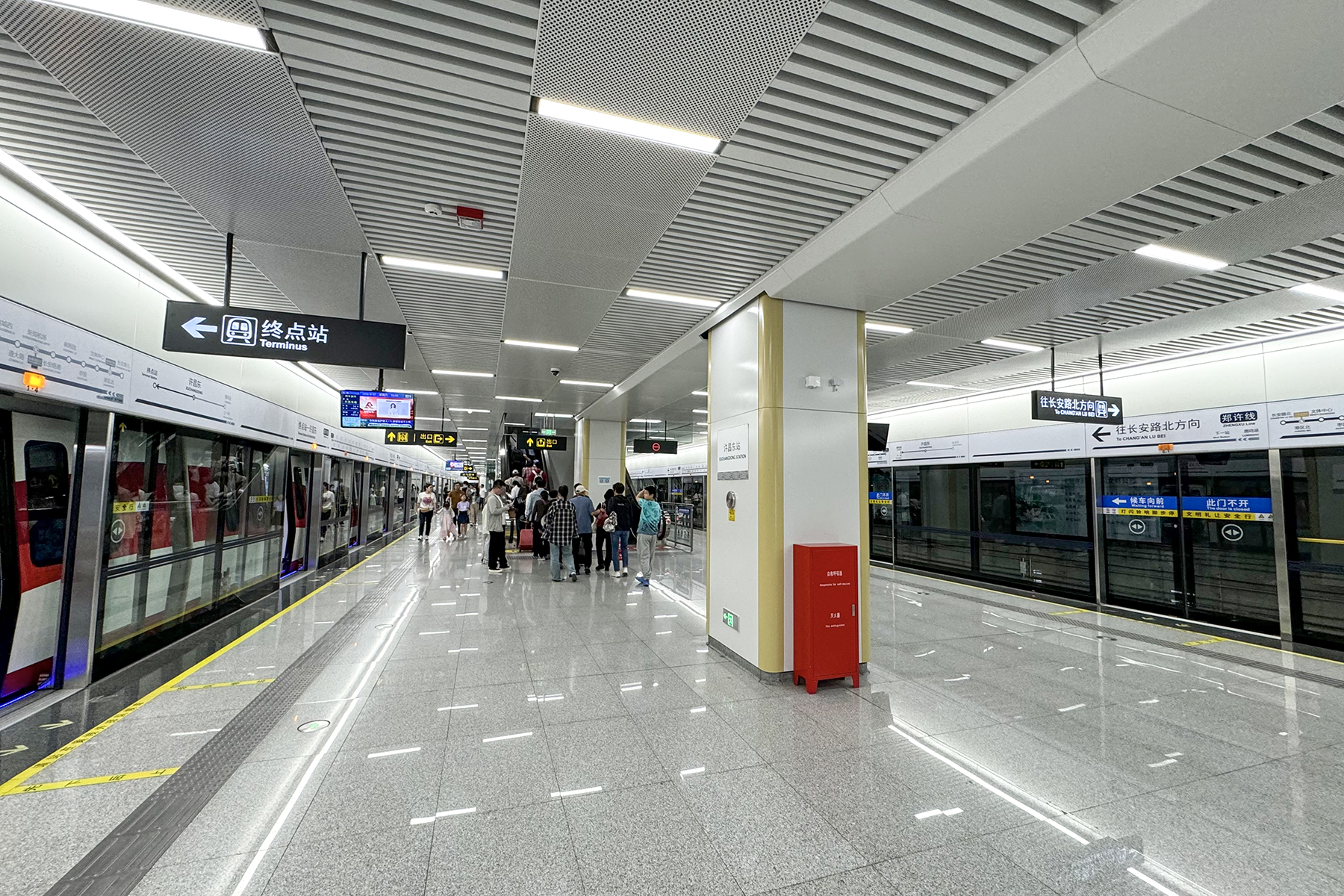

General information
- Location: Jian'an, Xuchang; China
- System: Zhengzhou Metro rapid transit station
- Operator: Zhengzhou Metro
- Line: Zhengxu line
- Platforms: 2
- Connections: Xuchangdong railway station

Construction
- Structure type: Underground

Other information
- Station code: 1773

History
- Opened: 2022

Services
Preceding station	Zhengzhou Metro	Following station
Luminglu towards Chang'anlubei	Zhengxu line	Terminus
Location

Xuchangdong (Chinese: 许昌东站) is a station on Zhengxu line of the Zhengzhou Metro. The station is beneath Xuchang East Railway Station.
