= Minggang East railway station =

Railway station in Minggang, China

Minggangdong 明港东
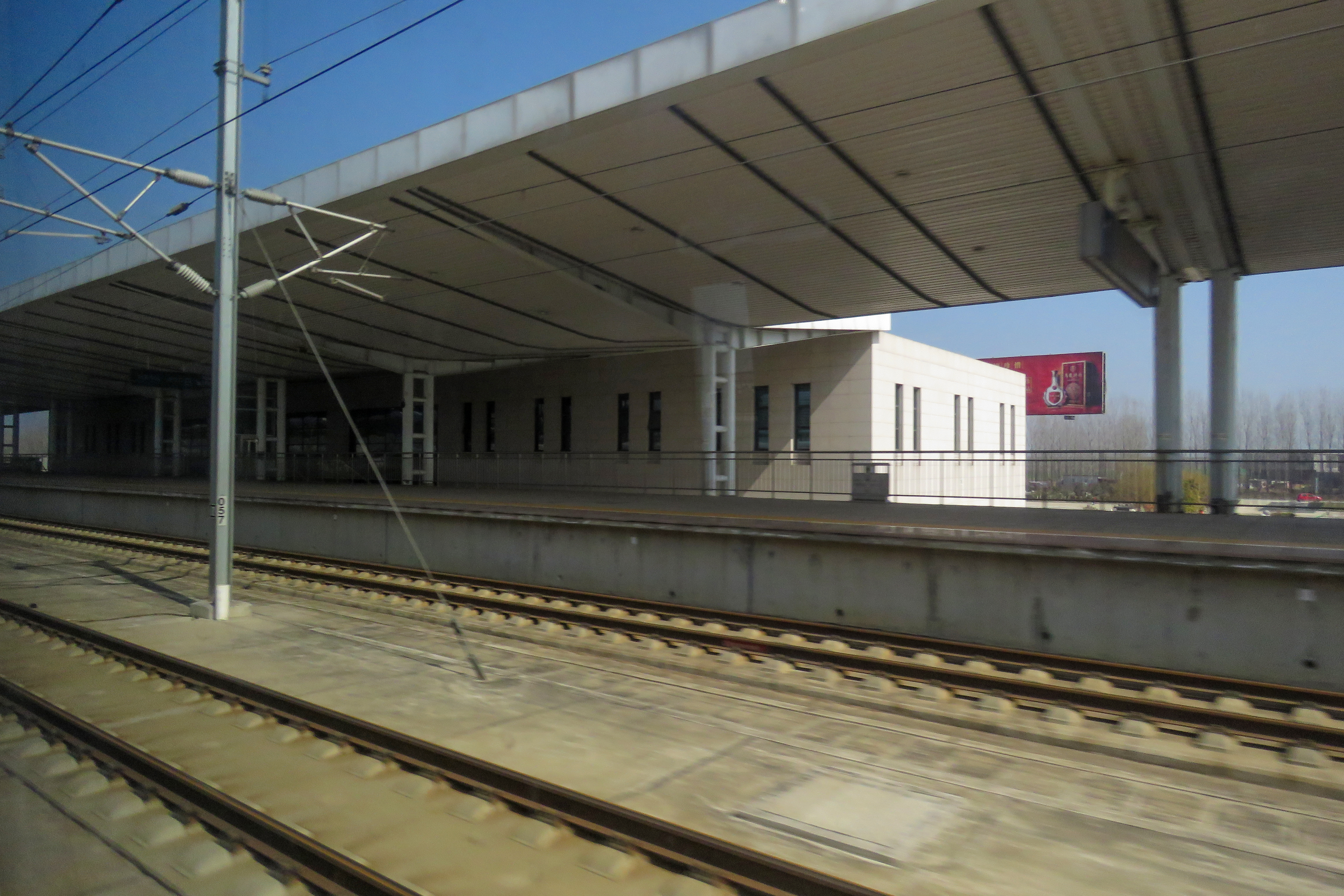

General information
- Location: Minggang, Pingqiao District, Xinyang, Henan Province; China
- Coordinates: 32.4888°N 114.0588°E
- Operated by: CR Wuhan
- Line(s): Shijiazhuang–Wuhan High-Speed Railway
- Platforms: 2
- Tracks: 4

Other information
- Station code: 65788 (TMIS code); MDN (telegraph code); MGD (Pinyin code)

History
- Opened: 28 September 2012

Services
Preceding station	China Railway High-speed	Following station
Zhumadian West towards Shijiazhuang	Shijiazhuang–Wuhan high-speed railway	Xinyang East towards Wuhan
Location

Minggang East railway station (Chinese: 明港东站) is a railway station of Beijing–Guangzhou–Shenzhen–Hong Kong High-Speed Railway located in Minggang, Pingqiao District, Xinyang, Henan Province, People's Republic of China.

== See also ==
- Minggang railway station
