= Luohe West railway station =

Railway station in Luohe, China

Luohexi 漯河西
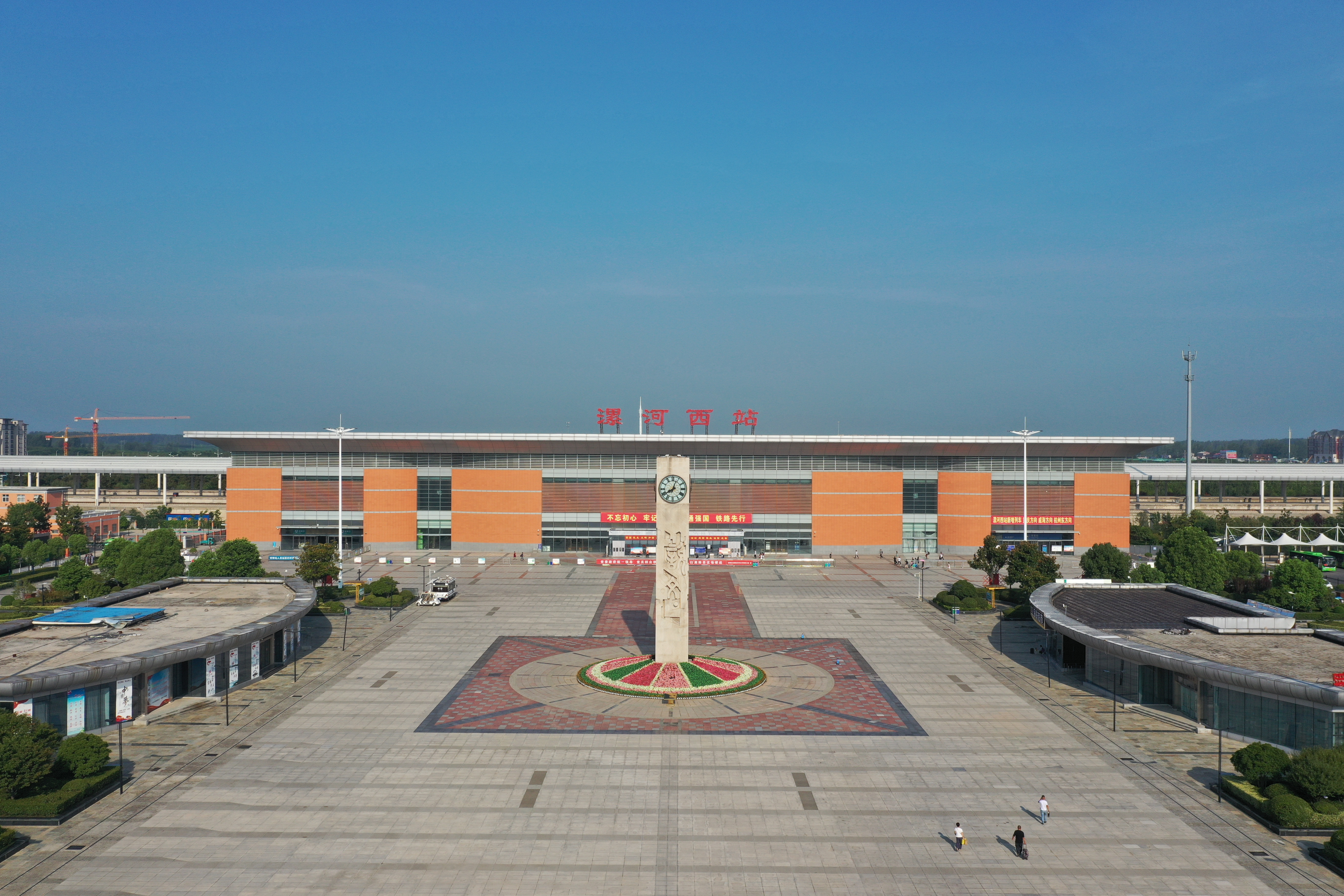

General information
- Other names: Luohe West
- Location: Cuihuashan Road; Yuanhui District, Luohe, Henan; China
- Coordinates: 33.5744°N 113.9576°E
- Operated by: CR Wuhan
- Line(s): Shijiazhuang–Wuhan high-speed railway; Pingdingshan–Luohe–Zhoukou high-speed railway (planned)
- Platforms: 4
- Tracks: 6
- Connections: Bus terminal

Other information
- Station code: 65782 (TMIS code); LBN (telegraph code); LHX (Pinyin code)

History
- Opened: 28 September 2012

Services
Preceding station	China Railway High-speed	Following station
Xuchang East towards Shijiazhuang	Shijiazhuang–Wuhan high-speed railway	Zhumadian West towards Wuhan

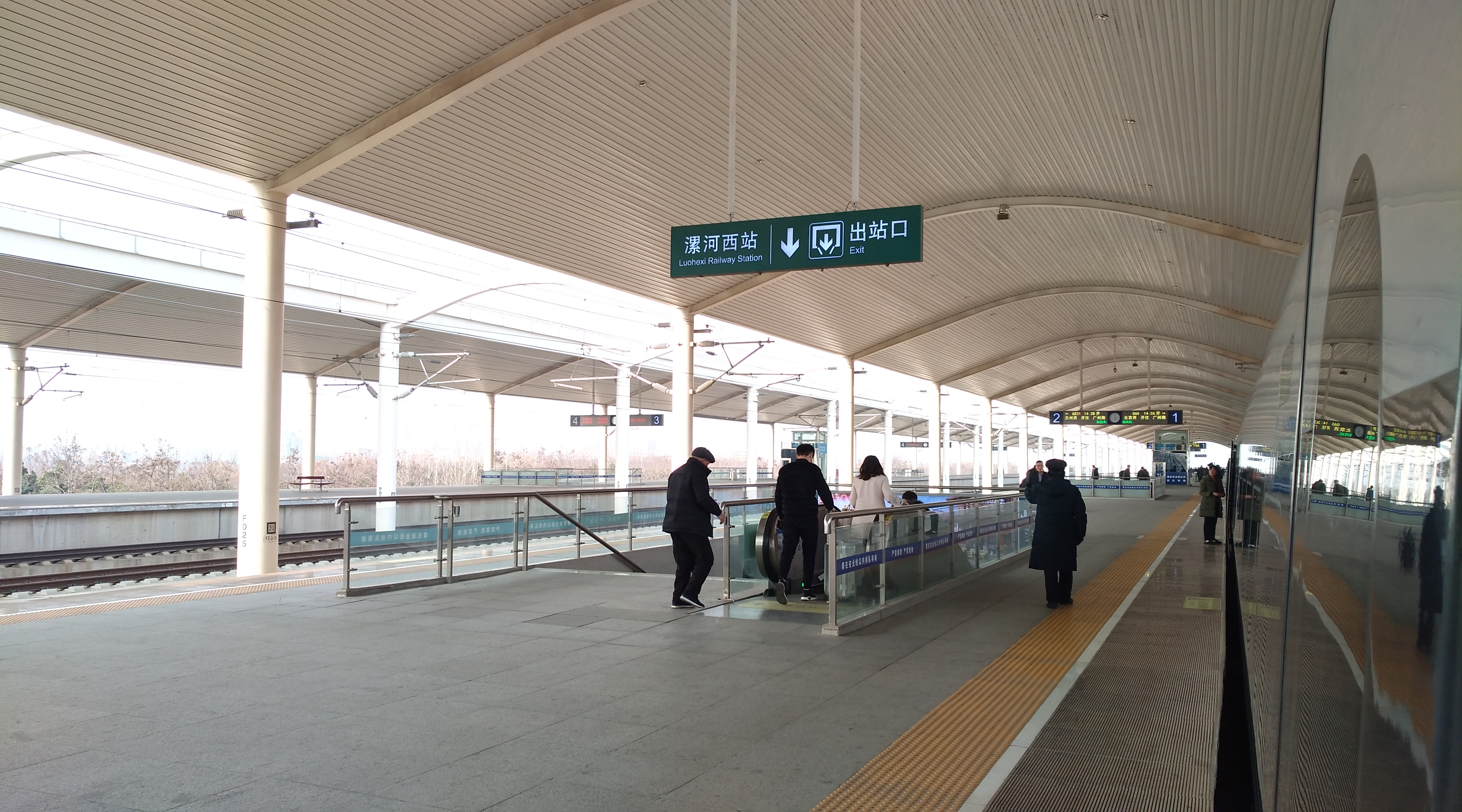
Platform 1&2

The Luohexi (Luohe West) railway station (Chinese: 漯河西站) is a high-speed railway station of Beijing–Guangzhou–Shenzhen–Hong Kong High-Speed Railway located in Luohe, Henan, People's Republic of China.
