= Zhumadian West railway station =

Railway station in Zhumadian, China

Coordinates: 33.0022°N 113.9728°E

Zhumadianxi 驻马店西
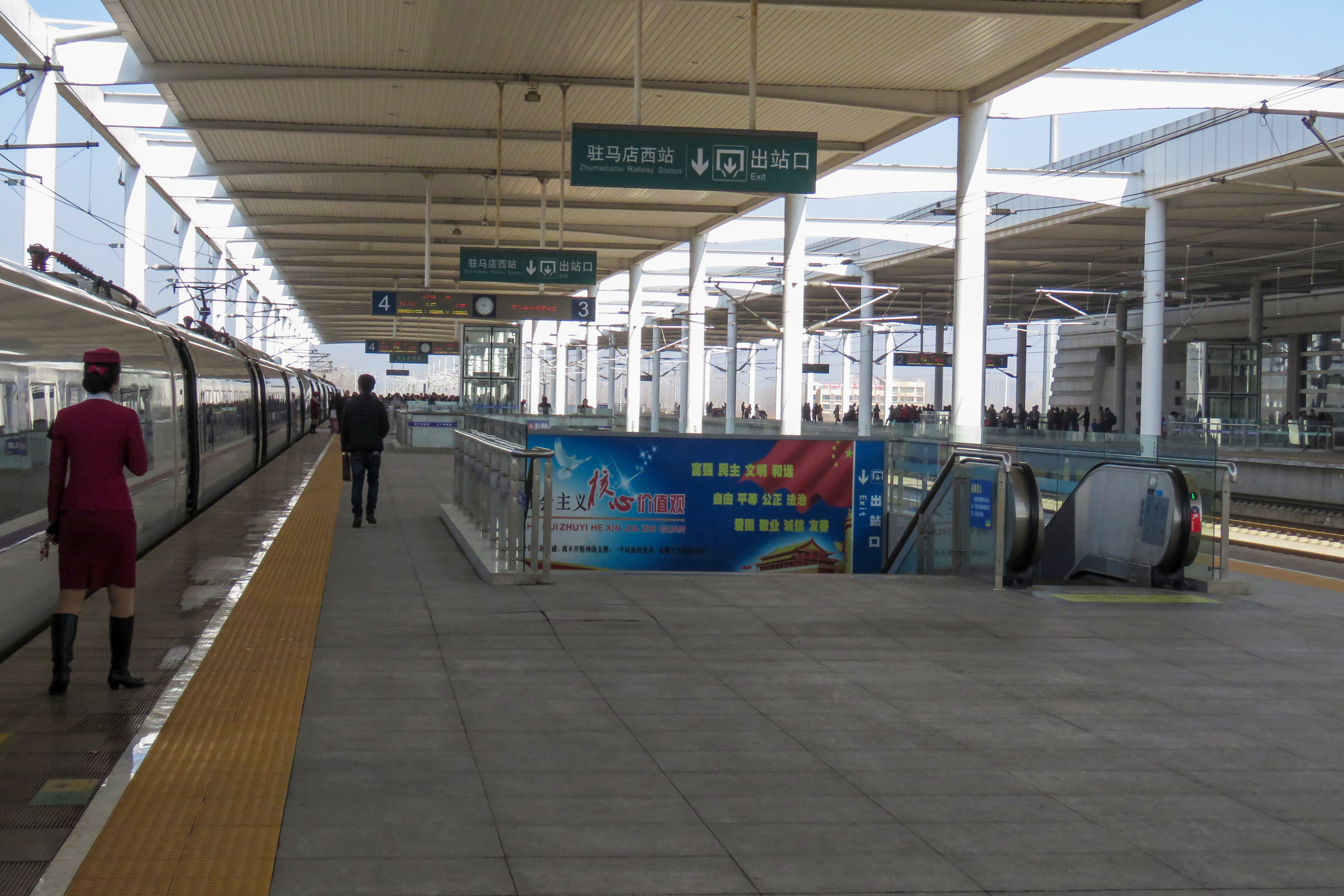

General information
- Other names: Zhumadian West
- Location: Zhumadian, Henan; China
- Operated by: CR Wuhan
- Line(s): Shijiazhuang–Wuhan high-speed railway
- Platforms: 4
- Tracks: 6

Other information
- Station code: 65785 (TMIS code); ZLN (telegraph code); ZMX (Pinyin code)

History
- Opened: 28 September 2012

Services
| Preceding station | China Railway High-speed | Following station |
|---|---|---|
| Luohe West towards Shijiazhuang | Shijiazhuang–Wuhan high-speed railway | Minggang East towards Wuhan |

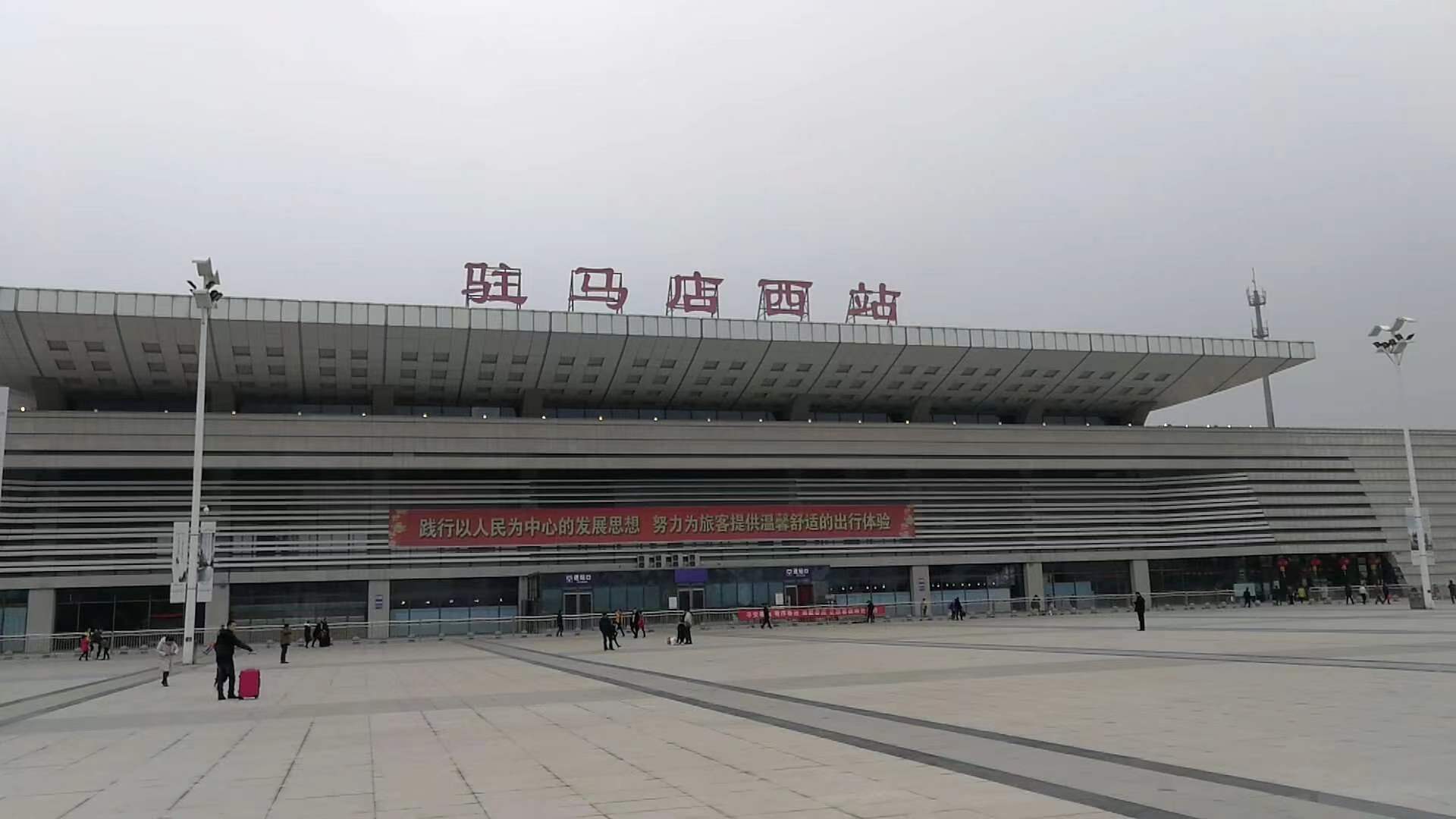
Zhumadian is named after the Royal post station here. The overall shape of Zhumadian West Railway Station is like a bottle (ancient wine holding appliance), which is intended to hold up good wine and sincerely welcome guests and friends from all over the world to visit Zhumadian by high-speed railway.

The Zhumadian West Station (Chinese: 驻马店西站) is a railway station of Beijing–Guangzhou–Shenzhen–Hong Kong High-Speed Railway located in Zhumadian, Henan, People's Republic of China.
