= Xinyang East railway station =

Railway station in Xinyang, China

Xinyangdong 信阳东
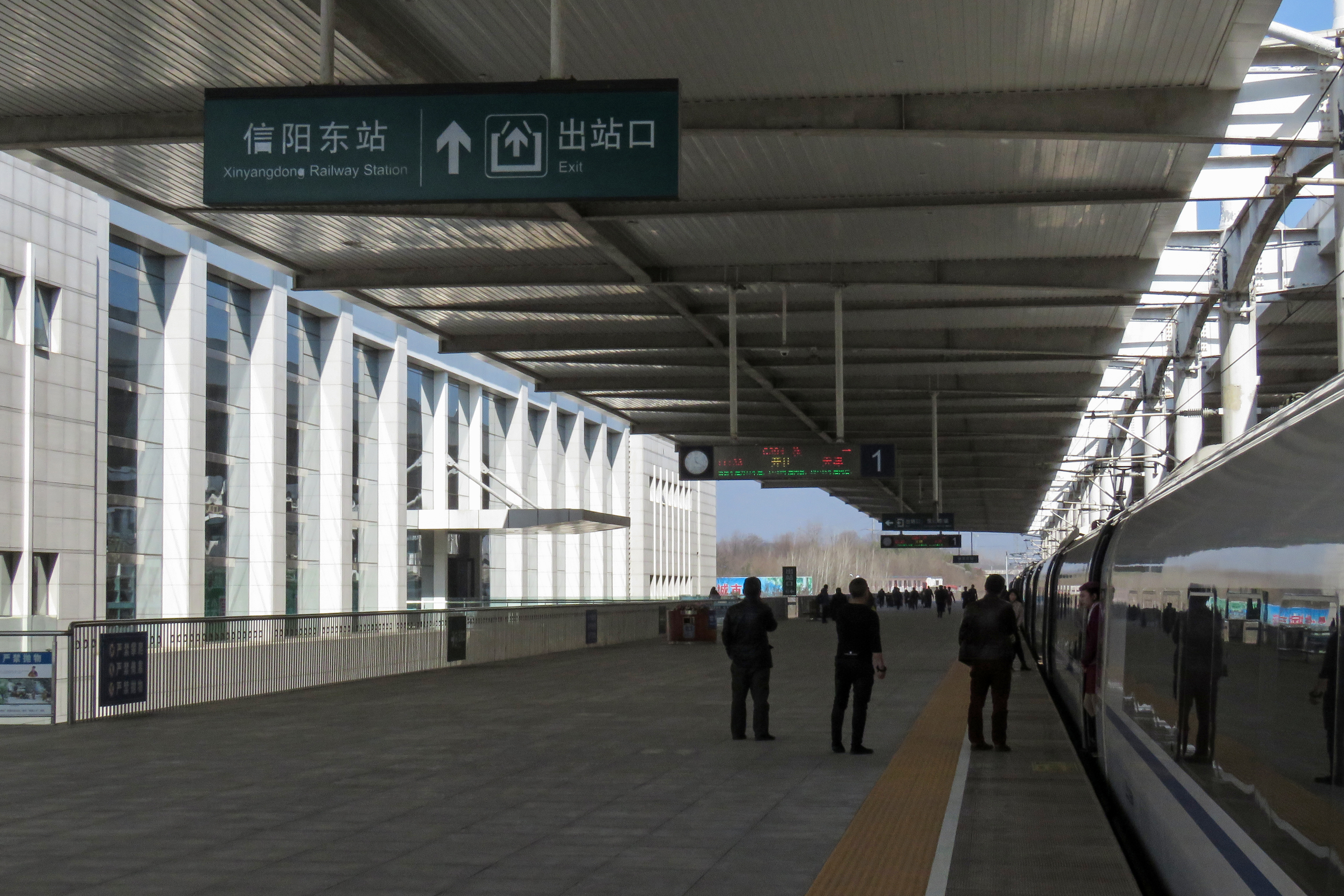
- Platform 1 of the station

General information
- Location: Pingqiao District, Xinyang; China
- Coordinates: 32.15°N 114.16°E
- Operator: CR Wuhan
- Line: Shijiazhuang–Wuhan High-Speed Railway
- Connections: Bus

Other information
- Station code: 65791 (TMIS code); OYN (telegraph code); XYD (Pinyin code)

History
- Opened: 28 September 2012

Services
Preceding station	China Railway High-speed	Following station
Minggang East towards Shijiazhuang	Shijiazhuang–Wuhan high-speed railway	Xiaogan North towards Wuhan
Location
- Location within Henan Location within China

The Xinyang East Railway Station (Chinese: 信阳东站) is a railway station of Beijing–Guangzhou–Shenzhen–Hong Kong High-Speed Railway located in Xinyang, Henan, People's Republic of China.
