= Hengdian East railway station =

Railway station in Wuhan, Hubei, China

Hengdian East 横店东
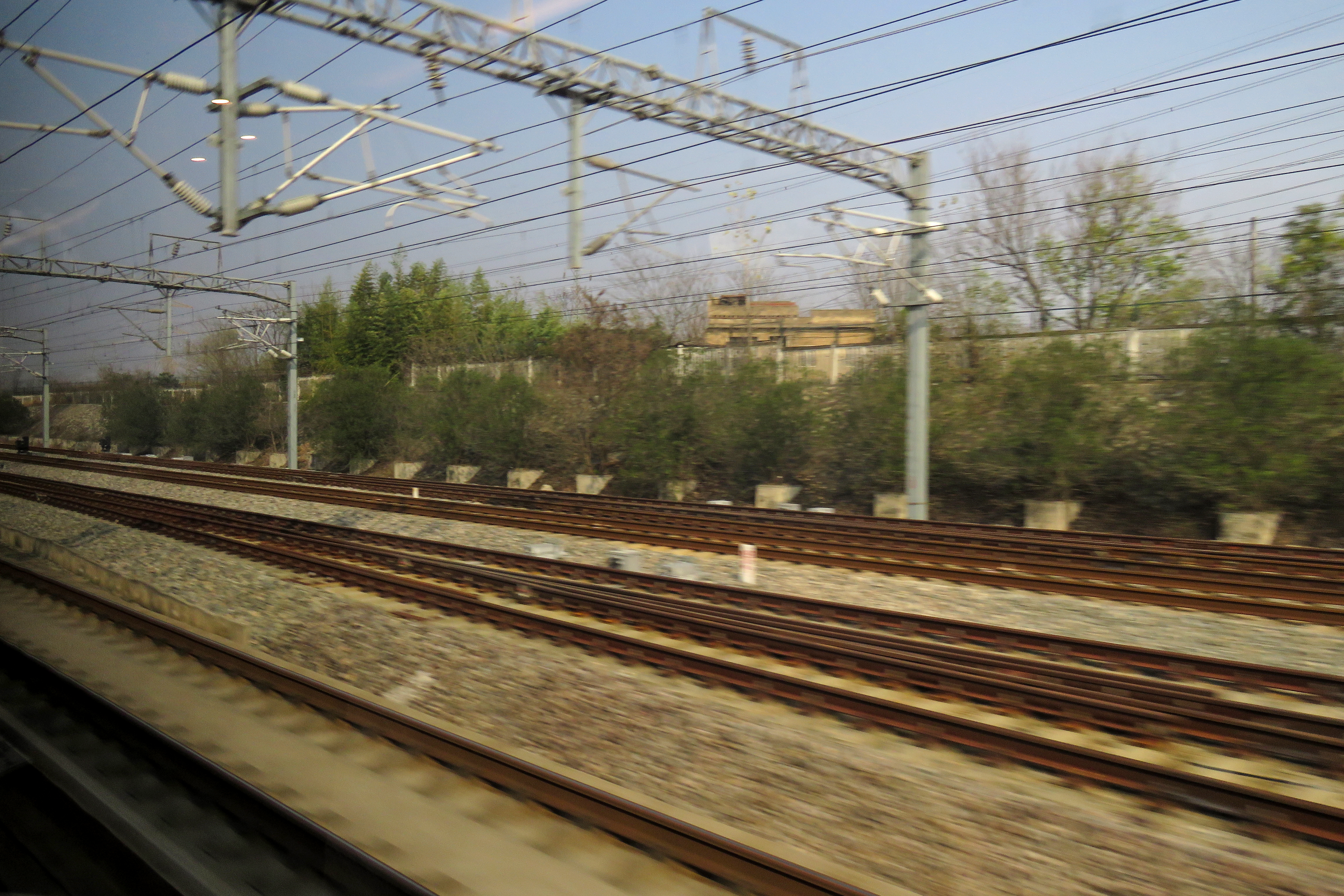

General information
- Other names: Hengdiandong
- Location: Huangpi District, Wuhan, Hubei province China
- Coordinates: 30.8167°N 114.3203°E
- Operated by: China Railway Wuhan Group
- Line: Shijiazhuang-Wuhan High-Speed Railway

History
- Opened: 2009

Services
Preceding station	China Railway High-speed	Following station
Xiaogan North towards Shijiazhuang	Shijiazhuang–Wuhan high-speed railway	Wuhan Terminus
Location

Hengdian East railway station (Chinese: 横店东站) is a railway station on the Shiwu Passenger Railway and the Beijing–Guangzhou–Shenzhen–Hong Kong High-Speed Railway. It is in Huangpi District, Wuhan, Hubei Province, China. The station opened in 2009.
