= Beijing–Harbin, Beijing–Hong Kong (Macau) corridor =

High-speed rail corridor in China

Beijing-Harbin, Beijing-Hong Kong (Macau) corridor 京哈～京港澳通道
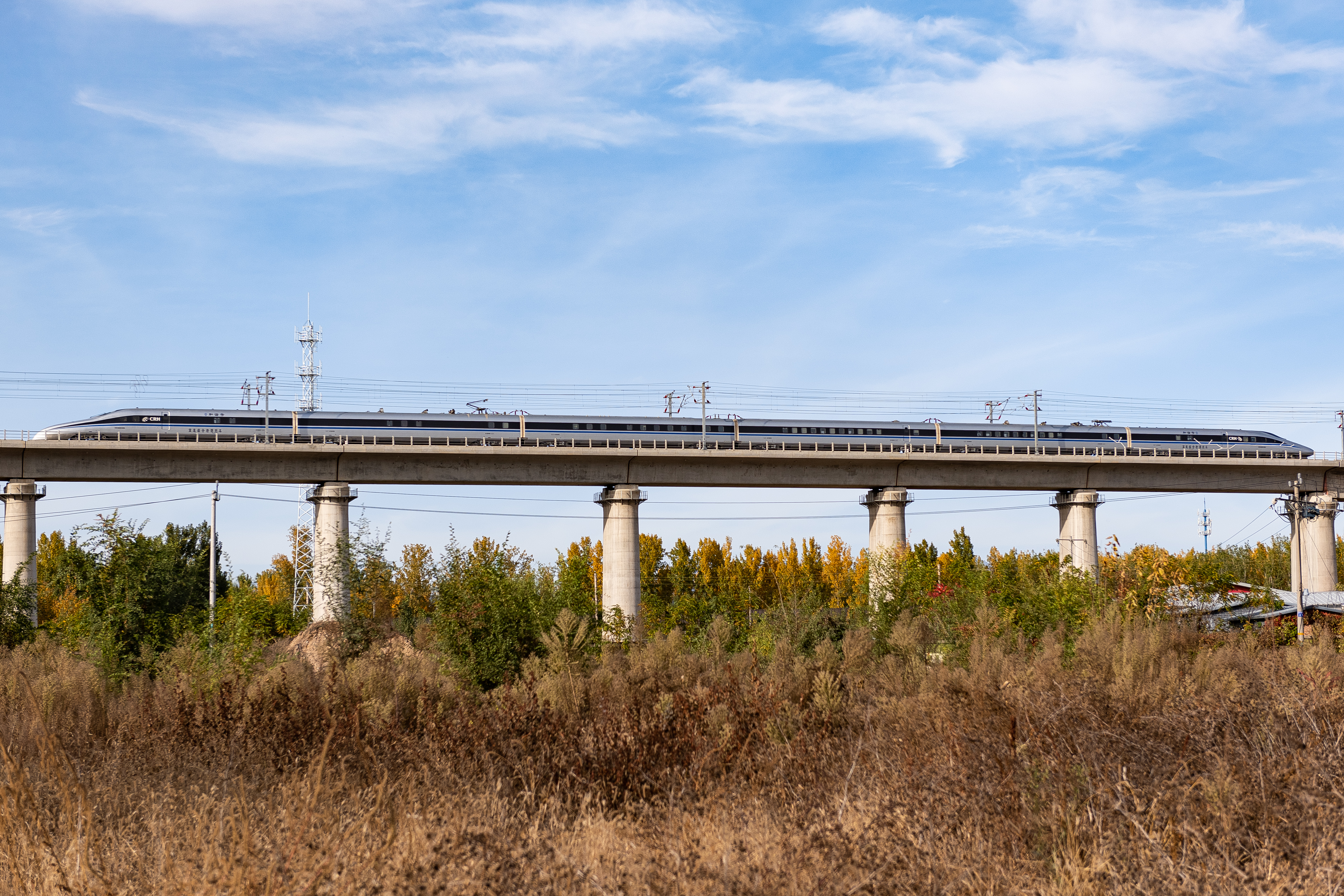
- CRH380AM performing a test run on the Beijing–Shenyang HSR in Beinianfeng Village, Yangsong Town, Huairou District, Beijing in October 2020

Overview
- Status: Operational
- Locale: People's Republic of China
- Termini: Harbin; Hong Kong Macau

Service
- Type: High-speed rail
- Operator: China Railway High-speed

Technical
- Track gauge: 1,435 mm (4 ft 8 1/2 in) standard gauge
- Electrification: 50 Hz 25,000 V
- Operating speed: 200 to 350 km/h (124 to 217 mph)

The Beijing–Harbin, Beijing–Hong Kong (Macau) corridor is a high-speed rail passage connecting Harbin in Heilongjiang province to the Hong Kong and Macau Special Administrative Regions via Beijing. The passage will pass through the cities of Changchun, Shenyang, Beijing, Shijiazhuang, Zhengzhou, Wuhan, Changsha, and Guangzhou before splitting into two lines: one passing through Shenzhen before terminating at Hong Kong, the other passing through Zhuhai before terminating at Macau.

Announced in 2016 as part of China's "Eight Vertical and Eight Horizontal" network, the passage is essentially a merger of two lines previously under the "Four Vertical and Four Horizontal" high-speed railway network: the Beijing–Harbin high-speed railway and the Beijing–Guangzhou–Shenzhen–Hong Kong high-speed railway, with the addition of the Guangzhou–Macau branch line. The Shenyang–Dalian railway section, initially considered part of the Beijing–Harbin high-speed railway, now forms part of the Coastal corridor, a different rail corridor.

== Route ==
=== Main route (Harbin to Hong Kong) ===
Section Railway line	Description	Designed speed (km/h)	Length (km)	Construction start date	Open date
Harbin–Shenyang; Harbin–Dalian high-speed railway (section)	HSR from Harbin to Shenyang, part of longer route to Dalian and Changchun.	350 (summer); 250 (winter)	921	2007-08-23	2012-12-01
Shenyang-Beijing; Beijing–Shenyang high-speed railway	HSR from Beijing to Shenyang via Chengde, Fuxin and Chaoyang	350	684	2014-02-28	2018-12-29 (Chengde South–Shenyang section); 2021-01-22 (Beijing Chaoyang–Chengde South section)
Beijing–Shijiazhuang; Beijing–Shijiazhuang high-speed railway	HSR from Beijing to Shijiazhuang	350	281	2008-10-08	2012-12-26
Shijiazhuang–Wuhan; Shijiazhuang–Wuhan high-speed railway	HSR from Shijiazhuang to Zhengzhou	350	838	2008-10-15	2012-12-26
Shijiazhuang–Wuhan; Shijiazhuang–Wuhan high-speed railway	HSR from Zhengzhou to Wuhan	350	838	2008-10-15	2012-09-28
Wuhan–Guangzhou; Wuhan–Guangzhou high-speed railway	HSR from Wuhan to Guangzhou via Changsha	350	968	2005-09-01	2009-12-26; 2010-01-30
Guangzhou–Shenzhen; Guangzhou–Shenzhen–Hong Kong Express Rail Link	Mainland section of the Express Rail Link. HSR from Guangzhou to Shenzhen North Railway Station.	350	116	2008-08-20	2011-12-26
Guangzhou–Shenzhen; Guangzhou–Shenzhen–Hong Kong Express Rail Link	Mainland section of the Express Rail Link. HSR from Shenzhen North to the border of Hong Kong.	350	116	2008-08-20	2015-12-30
Shenzhen–Hong Kong; Guangzhou–Shenzhen–Hong Kong Express Rail Link (Hong Kong section)	Hong Kong section of the Express Rail Link. HSR from the border of Shenzhen to Hong Kong.	200	26	2010	2018-09-23

=== Branch line (Guangzhou to Macau) ===
Section Railway line	Description	Designed speed (km/h)	Length (km)	Construction start date	Open date
Guangzhou–Zhuhai intercity railway	Intercity railway between Guangzhou and Zhuhai. Zhuhai Station next to Macau border.	200	187	2005-12-18	2011-01-07

== See also ==
- High-speed rail in China
