= Beijing–Guangzhou high-speed railway =

High-speed railway line in China

- China Railway High-speed
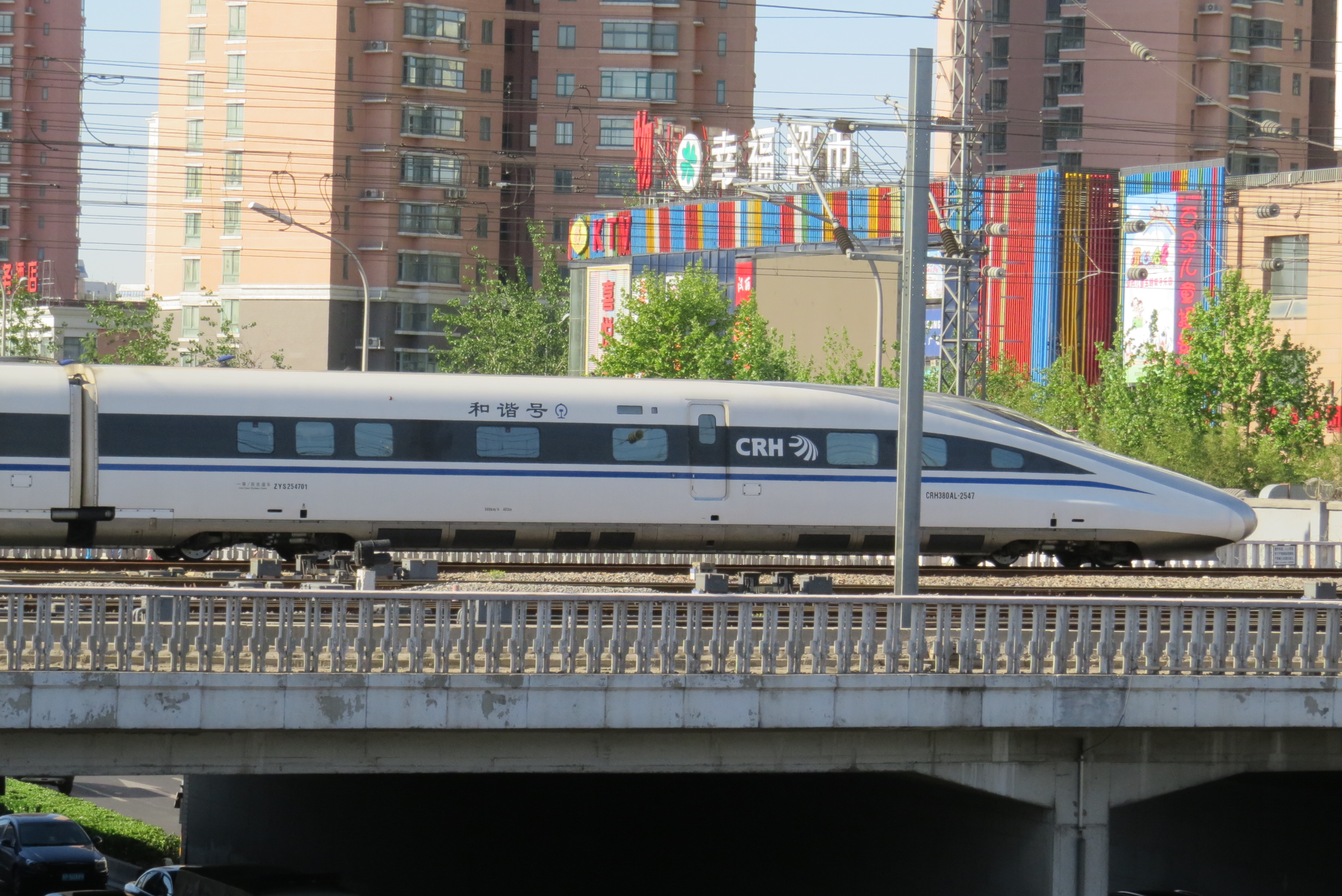
- A CRH380AL trainset departing Beijing for Shenzhen as G71

Overview
- Other name: Jingguang high-speed railway
- Native name: 京广高速铁路
- Status: Operational
- Owner: China Railway
- Locale: Beijing, Hebei, Henan, Hubei, Hunan, Guangdong
- Termini: Beijing Fengtai; Guangzhounan
- Stations: 42

Service
- Type: High-speed rail
- System: Beijing–Hong Kong (Macau) corridor
- Operator: China Railway High-speed
- Depots: Beijing MU Depot; Shijiazhuang MU Depot; Zhengzhou MU Depot; Wuhan MU Depot; Changsha MU Depot; Guangzhou MU Depot
- Rolling stock: CRH2E; CR400AF-A/AF-AZ/AF-S/AF-AE; CR400BF-A/BF-Z/BF-AZ

History
- Opened: 26 December 2012

Technical
- Line length: 2,118 km (1,316 mi)
- Num of tracks: 2 (Double-track)
- Character: Elevated
- Track gauge: 1,435 mm (4 ft 8 1/2 in) standard gauge
- Electrification: 25 kV 50 Hz AC (Overhead line)
- Operating speed: 350 km/h (220 mph)
- Signalling: CTCS-3
- Average inter-station distance: 47.8 km (29.7 mi)

Chinese name
- Simplified Chinese: 京广高速铁路
- Traditional Chinese: 京廣高速鐵路
Transcriptions
Standard Mandarin
- Hanyu Pinyin: Jīngguǎng Gāosù Tiělù
- IPA: [tɕíŋ.kwàŋ káʊ.sû tʰjè.lû]
Yue: Cantonese
- Jyutping: ging^{1}gwong^{2}gou^{1}cuk^{1} tit^{3}lou^{6}
- IPA: [kɪŋ˥.kʷɔŋ˧˥ kɔw˥.tsʰʊk̚˥ tʰit̚˧.lɔw˨]

The Beijing–Guangzhou high-speed railway or Jingguang high-speed railway from its Chinese name is a high-speed railway corridor of the CRH passenger service, connecting Beijing Fengtai station in Beijing and Guangzhounan station in Guangdong. It is 2,118 kilometres (1,316 mi) long, and is the only Chinese high-speed railway to cross a border that requires immigration and customs clearance. The existing, conventional Jingguang railway runs largely parallel to the line.

The line forms part of the Beijing–Harbin, Beijing–Hong Kong (Macau) corridor, based on the "Eight Verticals and Eight Horizontals" railway master plan announced in 2016.

Route of the Beijing–Guangzhou high-speed railway

== History ==
Construction started in 2005. The Wuhan–Guangzhou section opened in December 2009, the Guangzhou–Shenzhen section opened in December 2011, the Zhengzhou–Wuhan section opened in September 2012, and the Beijing–Zhengzhou section was opened in December 2012. The 36-kilometre (22 mi) cross-border Shenzhen–Hong Kong section opened on 23 September 2018. The line is the world's longest high-speed rail route. The high speed rail line cuts travel time by more than half. The line fully opened on 23 September 2018.

== Through-services with other high-speed lines ==
Besides trains running between Beijing, Shijiazhuang, Zhengzhou, Wuhan, Changsha, Guangzhou and Shenzhen, the railway also has direct service with other connecting high-speed lines. The direct Xi'an–Zhengzhou–Wuhan–Guangzhou–Shenzhen service started simultaneously with the opening of the Zhengzhou–Wuhan section in September 2012, as well as the direct interline service Xi'an-Zhengzhou–Beijing, Taiyuan–Shijiazhuang–Guangzhou, Taiyuan–Shijiazhuang–Wuhan–Guangzhou. The Hangzhou–Fuzhou–Shenzhen high-speed railway have through operation to Guangzhou South albeit limited due to track situation in Shenzhen North Station.

== Connections to local transport ==
To minimize disruptions to existing urban areas and provide large curve radii, the Beijing–Guangzhou high-speed railway, similar to other such railways in China, was constructed in an alignment somewhat different from the existing Beijing–Guangzhou Railway. In most cities served by the high-speed railway, its trains stop at stations built specifically for the new line, which are away from the urban core and the city's conventional railway station. In some of the larger cities, it may take more than an hour to ride a bus or taxi from the city centre to the high-speed rail station. One notable exception is Shijiazhuang station, which is shared with conventional trains and located in city centre (but moved south from the original). It is also possible for high-speed trains to stop at Zhengzhou station and Hankou station, which shared the characteristics of Shijiazhuang Station, but unlike Shijiazhuang they are not on main track of the Beijing-Guangzhou High Speed line.

To alleviate this most of the cities involved have improved the public transit access to the new high-speed rail stations, or plan to do so. Guangzhounan station is already served by Guangzhou Metro (Line 2) and Beijingxi station served by Beijing Subway (Line 7, 9). Wuhan station is served by Wuhan Metro's Line 4 and Zhengzhoudong station by Zhengzhou Metro's Line 1, both of which opened in December 2013, and Shijiazhuang station by Shijiazhuang Metro's Line 3, opened in June 2017.

== Transfers to other rail lines ==
Guangzhounan station and Wuhan station are designed as hubs for several high-speed railway (HSR) lines. Frequent service to Zhuhai is available at Guangzhou South, while a connection to Yichang can be made at Wuhan.

Although the Beijing–Guangzhou HSR largely parallels the older conventional Beijing–Guangzhou line, most of the HSR stations are located away from the local conventional train stations. Therefore, direct transfer to conventional (not high-speed) trains is possible only at a few stations along the route. Among them are Beijing West (which is one of the nation's main passenger railway hubs), Shijiazhuang, and Guangzhou North, where both lines meet.

== Immigration clearance ==
As Hong Kong is a Special Administrative Region, the Shenzhen-Hong Kong portion of the high speed rail passes through an immigration control point. The West Kowloon Terminus was designed to allow both Mainland and Hong Kong officials to conduct immigration control in Hong Kong, but for several years there was an unclear constitutional issue as Mainland officials were thought not to have the constitutional authority to enforce Mainland law in Hong Kong. In November 2017, the Government of Hong Kong resolved this by signing the Co-operation Arrangement for Implementing Co-location Arrangement, designating a portion of West Kowloon railway station as the "Mainland Port Area" that would be subject to Mainland law. Travelers coming from Hong Kong therefore pass through Mainland immigration and customs clearance before boarding their trains, allowing direct service to the entire Mainland high-speed rail network without having to stop at the Mainland-Hong Kong border.

== Sections ==
Section	Description	Designed speed (km/h)	Length (km)	Construction start date	Open date	Top trip speed
Beijing–Guangzhou–Shenzhen–Hong Kong high-speed railway	HSR Corridor connecting North with Central China, consisting of four segments between Beijing, Shijiazhuang, Wuhan, Guangzhou and Hong Kong.	350	2230	1 September 2005	26 December 2012	See below
Beijing–Shijiazhuang section (Beijing–Shijiazhuang high-speed railway)	HSR from Beijingxi (further: Fengtai) to Shijiazhuang	350	281	8 October 2008	26 December 2012	-
Shijiazhuang–Wuhan section (Shijiazhuang–Wuhan high-speed railway)	HSR from Shijiazhuang to Wuhan via Zhengzhoudong	350	838	15 October 2008	28 September 2012 (Zhengzhou East–Wuhan); 26 December 2012 (Shijiazhuang–Zhengzhou East)	-
Wuhan–Guangzhou Section (Wuhan–Guangzhou high-speed railway)	HSR from Wuhan to Guangzhounan via Changshanan	350	968	1 September 2005	26 December 2009	

== Station list ==
Major railway terminals are in bold. Medium-size stations that trains can regularly terminate are in Italics.

Station name	Chinese	Total distance (km)	Travel time		Rail transfers*	Metro and Commuter rail transfers*	Platforms	Tracks served by platform	Location		
Station name	Chinese	Total distance (km)	250 km/h	350 km/h	Rail transfers*	Metro and Commuter rail transfers*	Platforms	Tracks served by platform	Prefecture/ City	Province/ Territory	
**Beijing West**	北京西	0	0:00	0:00	Beijing–Guangzhou railway Beijing–Kowloon railway Beijing–Xiong'an intercity railway Beijing underground cross-city railway	7 9 Sub-Central			Beijing	Beijing	
Zhuozhou East	涿州东 涿州東	59	0:26 (D901)	0:25 (G6723)					Baoding	Hebei	
Gaobeidian East	高碑店东 高碑店東	84	N/A (No D-trains from Beijing currently serve Gaobeidian)	0:30 (G505)					Baoding	Hebei	
Baoding East	保定东 保定東	139	0:45 (D923)	0:35 (G345)					Baoding	Hebei	
Dingzhou East	定州东 定州東	200	N/A (No D-trains from Beijing currently serve Dingzhou)	0:54 (G671)					Baoding	Hebei	
Zhengding Airport	正定机场 正定機場	244	N/A (No D-trains from Beijing currently serve Zhengding Airport)	1:06 (G629)					Shijiazhuang	Hebei	
**Shijiazhuang**	石家庄 石家莊	280	1:22 (D927)	1:00 (G315)	Beijing–Guangzhou railway Shijiazhuang–Dezhou railway Shijiazhuang–Taiyuan railway Shijiazhuang–Taiyuan passenger railway	2 3			Shijiazhuang	Hebei	
Gaoyi West	高邑西	323	N/A (No D-trains from Beijing currently serve Gaoyi)	1:45 (G511)					Shijiazhuang	Hebei	
Xingtai East	邢台东 邢臺東	384	1:55 (D927)	1:36 (G345)					Xingtai	Hebei	
Handan East	邯郸东 邯鄲東	437	N/A (No D-trains from Beijing currently serve Handan)	1:37 (G311)					Handan	Hebei	
Anyang East	安阳东 安陽東	496	2:27 (D903)	1:48 (G367)					Anyang	Henan	
Hebi East	鹤壁东 鶴壁東	542	2:55 (D901)	1:56 (G305)					Hebi	Henan	
Xinxiang East	新乡东 新鄉東	595	N/A (No D-trains from Beijing currently serve Xinxiang)	2:21 (G345)					Xinxiang	Henan	
**Zhengzhou East**	郑州东 鄭州東	663	3:08 (D919)	2:11 (G377)	Xuzhou–Lanzhou high-speed railway Zhengzhou–Kaifeng intercity railway Zhengzhou–Xinzheng Airport intercity railway	1 5			Zhengzhou	Henan	
Xuchang East	许昌东 許昌東	744	N/A (No D-trains from Beijing currently serve Xuchang)	2:43 (G333)		Zhengxu line				Henan	Xuchang
Luohe West	漯河西	799	N/A (No D-trains from Beijing currently serve Luohe)	3:53 (G527)					Luohe	Henan	
Zhumadian West	驻马店西 駐馬店西	864	N/A (No D-trains from Beijing currently serve Zhumadian)	3:09 (G307)					Zhumadian	Henan	
Minggang East	明港东 明港東	917	N/A (No D-trains from Beijing currently serve Minggang)						Xinyang	Henan	
Xinyang East	信阳东 信陽東	960	N/A (No D-trains from Beijing currently serve Xinyang East station)	3:21 (G317)					Xinyang	Henan	
Xiaogan North	孝感北	1024	N/A (No D-trains from Beijing currently serve Xiaogan)	5:10 (G1043)					Xiaogan	Hubei	
Hengdian East	横店东 橫店東								Wuhan	Hubei	
**Wuhan**	武汉 武漢	1136	N/A (No D-trains from Beijing currently serve Wuhan Station)	3:48 (G339)	Shanghai–Wuhan–Chengdu high-speed railway Wuhan–Jiujiang passenger railway Wuhan–Huangshi intercity railway Wuhan–Huanggang intercity railway	metro 4			Wuhan	Hubei	
Xianning North	咸宁北 咸寧北	1221	N/A (No D-trains from Beijing currently serve Xianning)	5:46 (G505)					Xianning	Hubei	
Chibi North	赤壁北	1264							Xianning	Hubei	
Yueyang East	岳阳东 岳壁東	1346	N/A (No D-trains from Beijing currently serve Yueyang East station)	4:43 (G315)					Yueyang	Hunan	
Miluo East	汨罗东 汨羅東	1416	N/A (No D-trains from Beijing currently serve Miluo)	6:45 (G503)					Yueyang	Hunan	
**Changsha South**	长沙南 長沙南	1484	N/A (No D-trains from Beijing currently serve Changsha South station)	5:10 (G381)	Shanghai–Kunming high-speed railway	2 4 Maglev			Changsha	Hunan	
Zhuzhou West	株洲西	1524	N/A (No D-trains from Beijing currently serve Zhuzhou)	7:42 (G503)					Zhuzhou	Hunan	
Hengshan West	衡山西	1591		8:30 (G1043)					Hengyang	Hunan	
Hengyang East	衡阳东 衡陽東	1632	N/A (No D-trains from Beijing currently serve Hengyang)	5:55 (G301)					Hengyang	Hunan	
Leiyang West	耒阳西 耒陽西	1687	N/A (No D-trains from Beijing currently serve Leiyang)	8:28 (G1051)					Hengyang	Hunan	
Chenzhou West	郴州西	1766	N/A (No D-trains from Beijing currently serve Chenzhou)	9:02 (G1051)					Chenzhou	Hunan	
Lechang East	乐昌东 樂昌東			9:25 (G1025)					Shaoguan	Guangdong	
Shaoguan	韶关 韶關	1896		9:20 (G1579)					Shaoguan	Guangdong	
Yingde West	英德西	1966							Qingyuan	Guangdong	
Qingyuan	清远 清遠	2023	12:59 (D2103)	10:06 (G1579)					Qingyuan	Guangdong	
Guangzhou North	广州北 廣州北	2060			With connection line to Guangzhou Baiyun railway station, served by D35 (21:22)	9			Guangzhou	Guangdong	
**Guangzhou South**	广州南 廣州南	2105	N/A (D35 goes to Guangzhou Baiyun; see above)	7:17 (G381)	Guangzhou–Zhuhai intercity railway Guangzhou–Shenzhen–Hong Kong Express Rail Link; Guiyang–Guangzhou high-speed railway Nanning–Guangzhou high-speed railway	2 7 22; 2			Guangzhou	Guangdong	

== See also ==
- Beijing–Hong Kong high-speed railway
