= Wuhan railway station =

Railway station in Wuhan, Hubei

Wuhan 武汉站 4 5 19
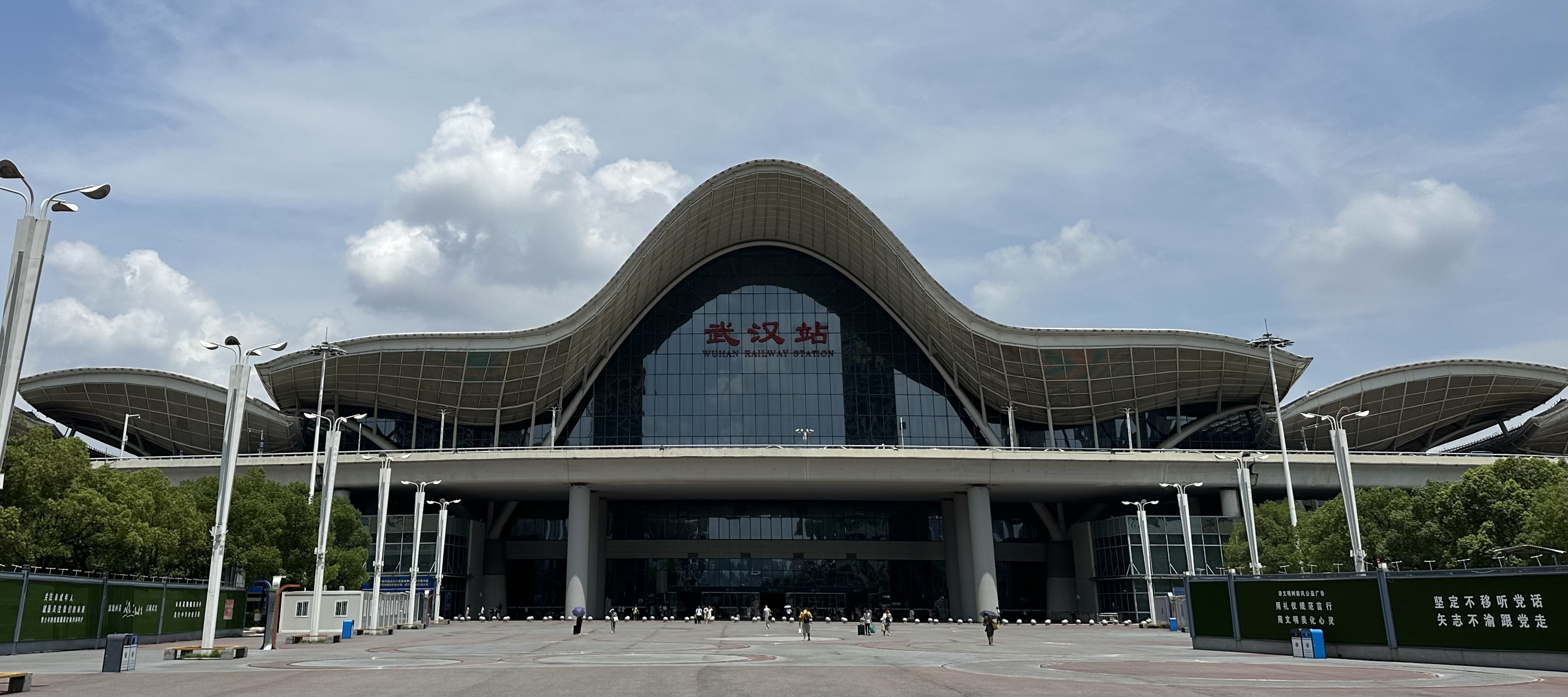
- Wuhan Railway Station in 2023

General information
- Location: Huanghe Lu, Hongshan District, Wuhan, Hubei; China
- Coordinates: 30°36′36.69″N 114°25′7.19″E
- Operated by: Wuhan Railway Bureau
- Lines: Shijiazhuang–Wuhan high-speed railway; Wuhan–Guangzhou high-speed railway; Wuhan–Jiujiang high-speed railway; Wuhan–Huangshi intercity railway; Wuhan–Huanggang intercity railway
- Platforms: 20 (9 island platforms, 2 side platforms)
- Connections: Bus terminal

Other information
- Station code: TMIS code: 65800; Telegraph code: WHN; Pinyin code: WHA
- Classification: Top Class station

History
- Opened: December 2009 (railway station); 28 December 2013 (Wuhan Metro Line 4); 28 March 2020 (resume to operation, arrival only for railway station; metro); 5 April 2020 (resume to operation)

Services
Preceding station	China Railway High-speed	Following station
Hengdian East towards Shijiazhuang	Shijiazhuang–Wuhan high-speed railway	Terminus
Terminus	Wuhan–Guangzhou high-speed railway	Wulongquan East towards Guangzhou South
Hengdian East towards Hefei South	Hefei–Wuhan railway	Terminus
Terminus	Wuhan–Jiujiang high-speed railway	Huashan South towards Jiujiang or Lushan
Terminus	Wuhan–Huangshi intercity railway	Huashan South towards Daye North
Terminus	Wuhan–Huanggang intercity railway	Huashan South towards Huanggang East
Location

Wuhan railway station (武汉站; 武漢站) is one of the three main passenger railway stations of Wuhan, the capital of China's Hubei Province. It is located northeast of Wuhan's East Lake, near a small lake called Yangchunhu, and is adjacent to the 3rd Ring Road. Administratively, the site is within the Wuhan's Hongshan District.

Although it shares its name with the sub-provincial city, this station was constructed rather recently; there was no Wuhan station before the construction of the Beijing-Guangzhou high speed railway, and Wuhan's main passenger railway stations were Hankou and Wuchang, representing old city names before the merger, which often confused outsiders. Completed in December 2009, the station has 11 platforms and 20 tracks. It serves the Beijing–Guangzhou–Shenzhen–Hong Kong high-speed railway, the Shanghai–Wuhan–Chengdu high-speed railway, and Zhengzhou/Jiujiang-bound passenger trains.

During the COVID-19 pandemic, Wuhan suspended all public transportation effective 10AM local time on January 23, 2020. This order applied to all bus, metro, and ferry lines, as well as all outbound trains and flights. Wuhan railway station was thus closed until March 28.

== Design ==
The station was designed by AREP (Architecture Recherche Engagement Post-carbone), the Fourth Survey and Design Institute of China, MaP3, and SNCF-IGOA, after winning a two-phase competition in 2005. The design was inspired by the yellow crane, the symbol of Wuhan City. The distinctive roof is intended to resemble the crane's wings, and is based on a sine curve. The building consists of nine separated parts, symbolizing China's nine provinces, plus a central thoroughfare.

== Construction ==
Construction of the station began in September 2006, and was completed in December 2009. It was built by China State Construction Engineering Corporation, which also built the Wuhan Airport and the Beijing CCTV building. Construction cost exceeded 14 billion Yuan (US$2 billion), including upgrades to surrounding infrastructure.

The total construction area of the station is 370,860 m^{2} (3,991,900 sq ft), of which the station building has a 114,602 m^{2} (1,233,570 sq ft) floor area, a 13,324 m^{2} (143,420 sq ft) elevated pedestrian platform, a 143,664 m^{2} (1,546,390 sq ft) non-stop pillar canopy, a 60,650 m^{2} (652,800 sq ft) ground floor, and a 38,620 m^{2} (415,700 sq ft) ground floor car park. The main arch spans 116 meters (381 ft), and the highest point is 58 meters (190 ft) above the ground.

== Services ==
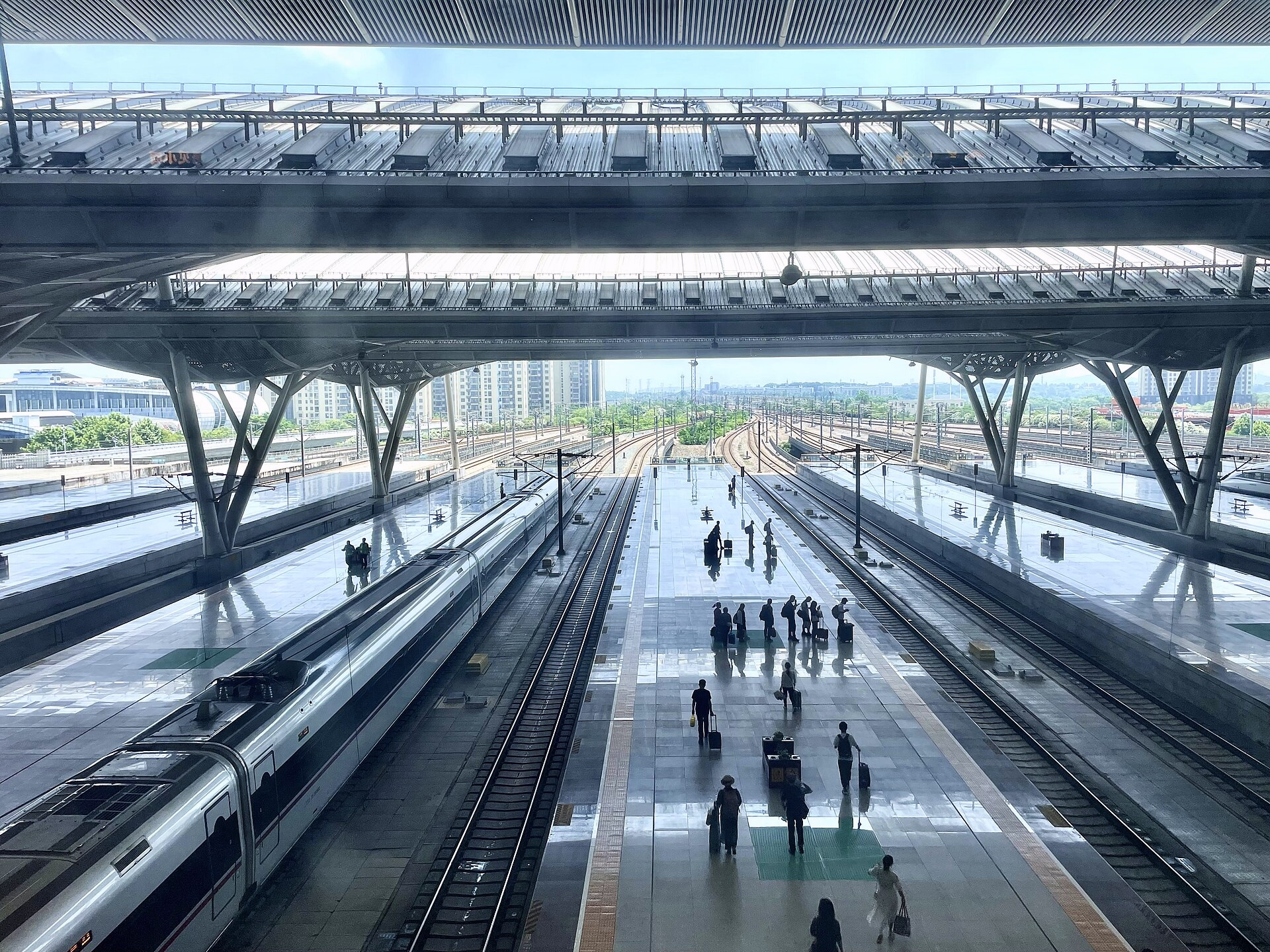
Inside view

Located on the main line of the Beijing–Guangzhou high-speed railway, Wuhan railway station is served by almost all trains traveling on this railway to or through Wuhan. (Only a small number of trains terminate at Hankou instead.)

Some high speed trains traveling via Wuhan on the Shanghai–Wuhan–Chengdu high-speed railway use Wuhan station as well, but most of them use Hankou instead. The Wuhan station is also served by some high speed trains traveling to and from Nanchang (on the Wuhan–Jiujiang Passenger Railway).

No "conventional" (non high-speed) trains are found in this station (due to this station is connected with high-speed line only); all of those services goes to Hankou or Wuchang stations instead.

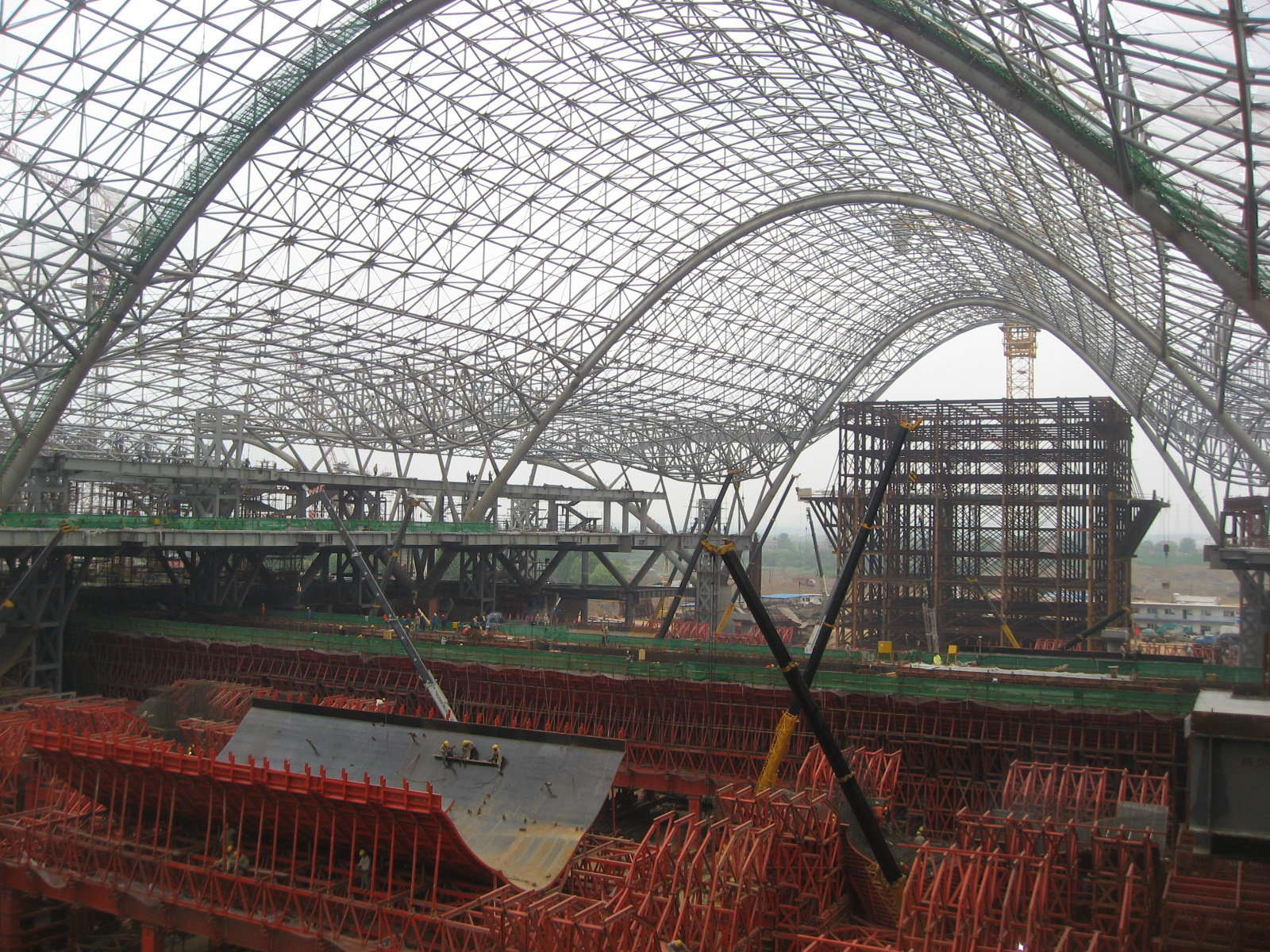
Under construction

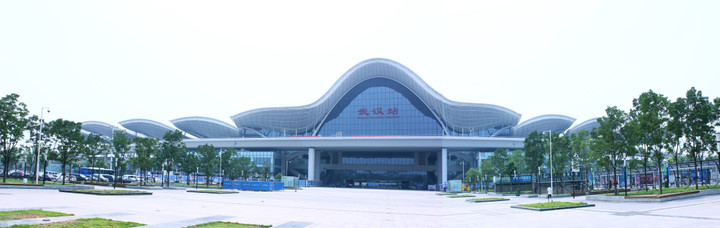

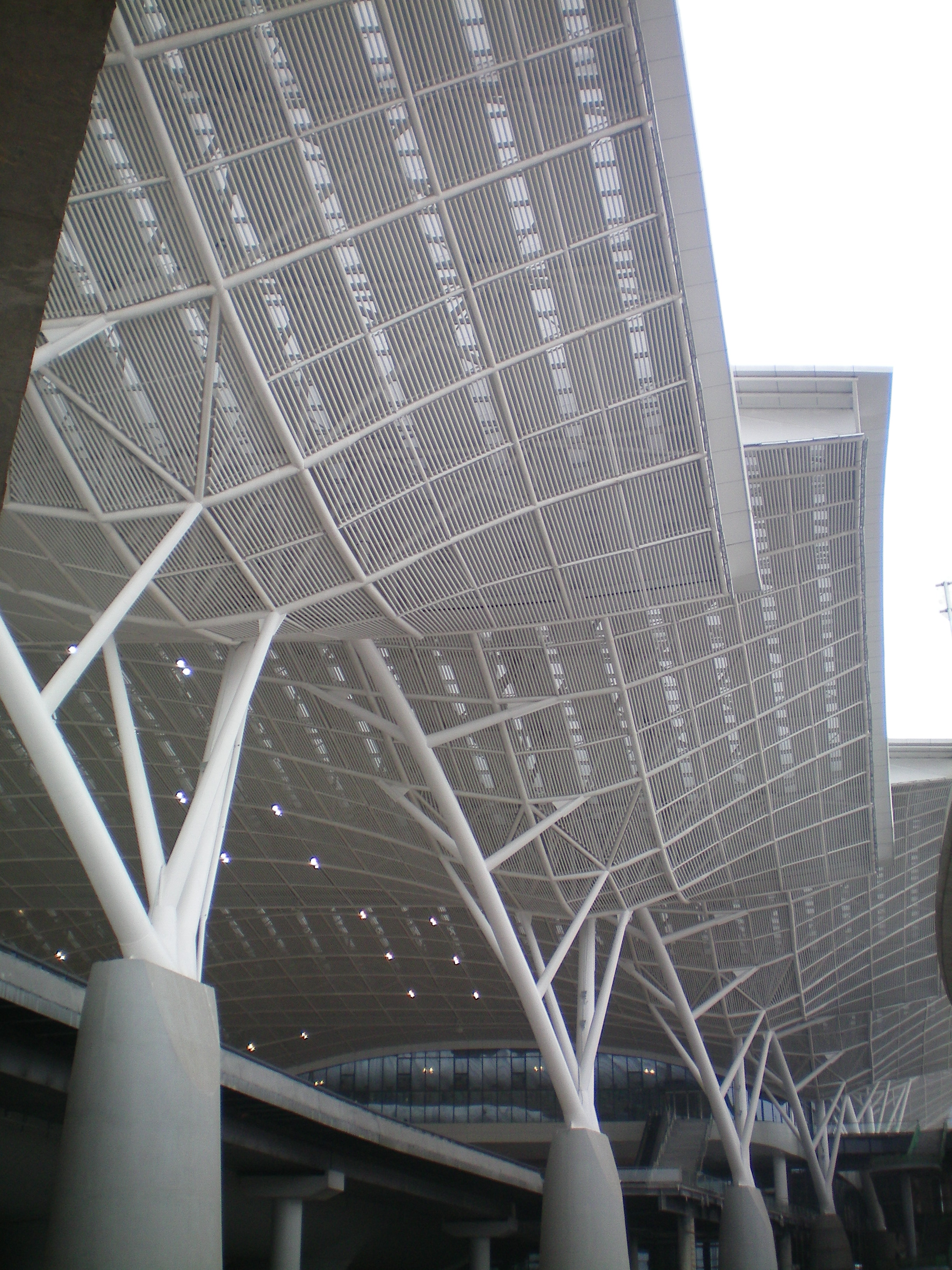

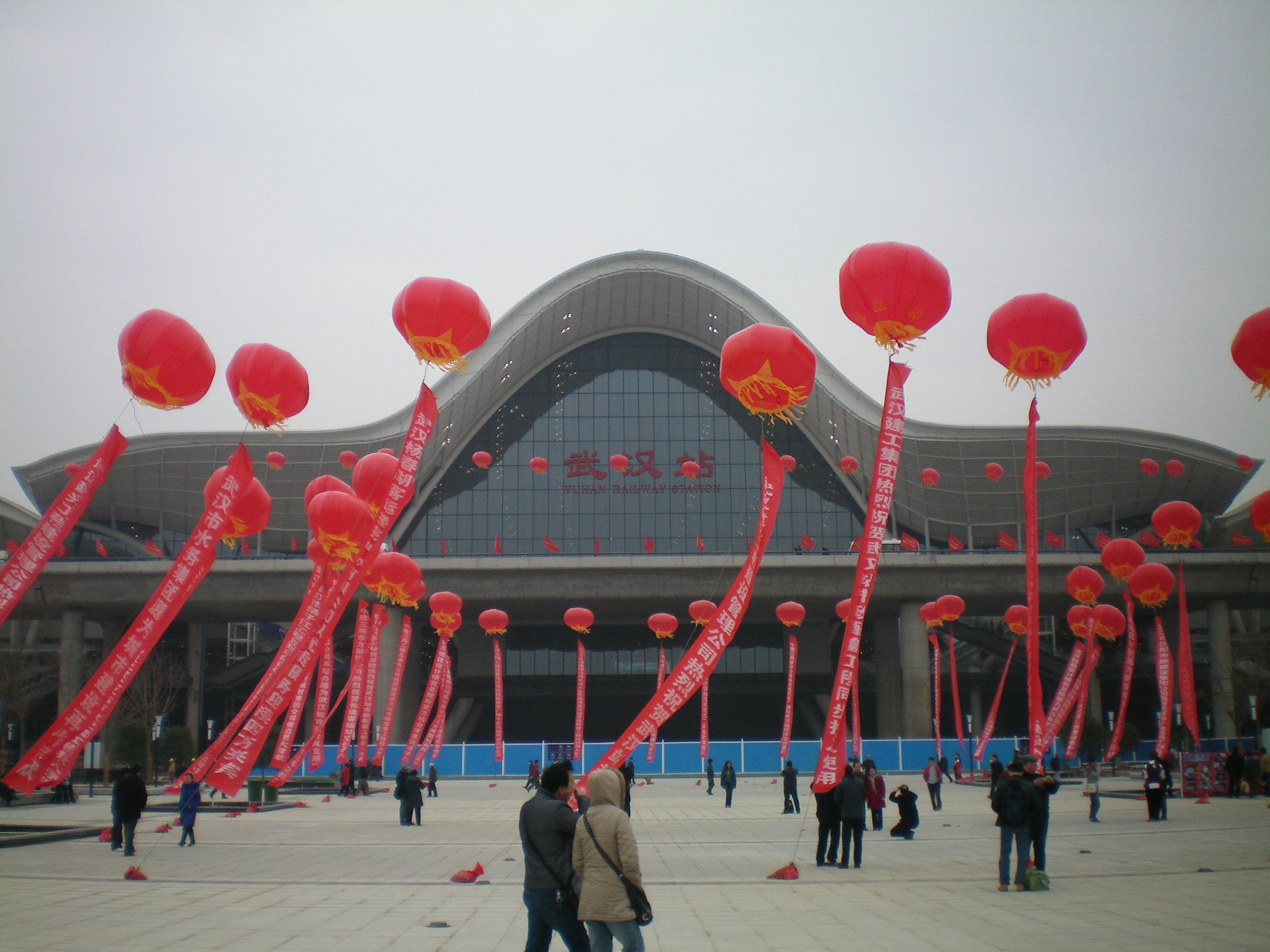
Opening Ceremony

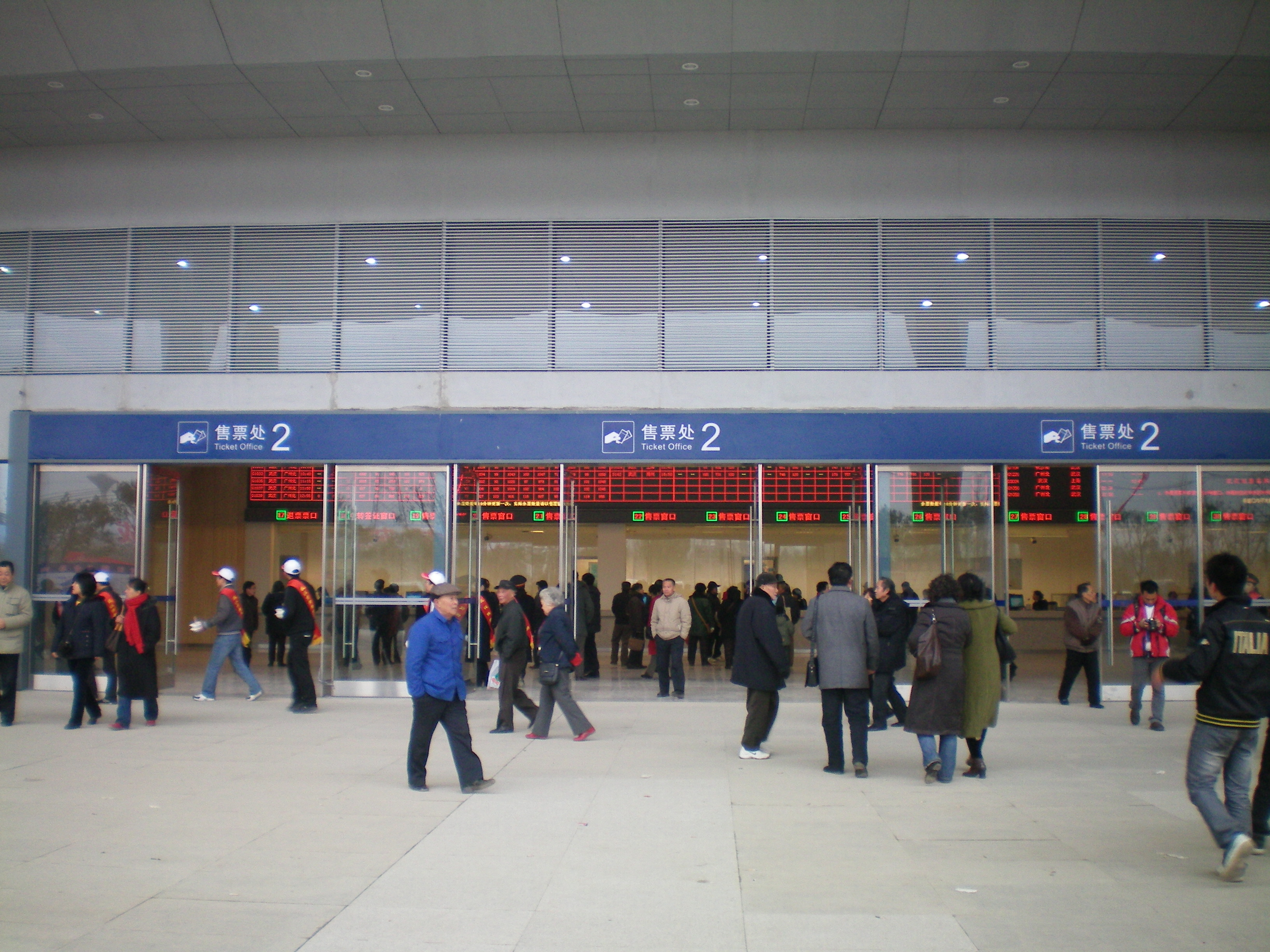
No.2 Ticket Office

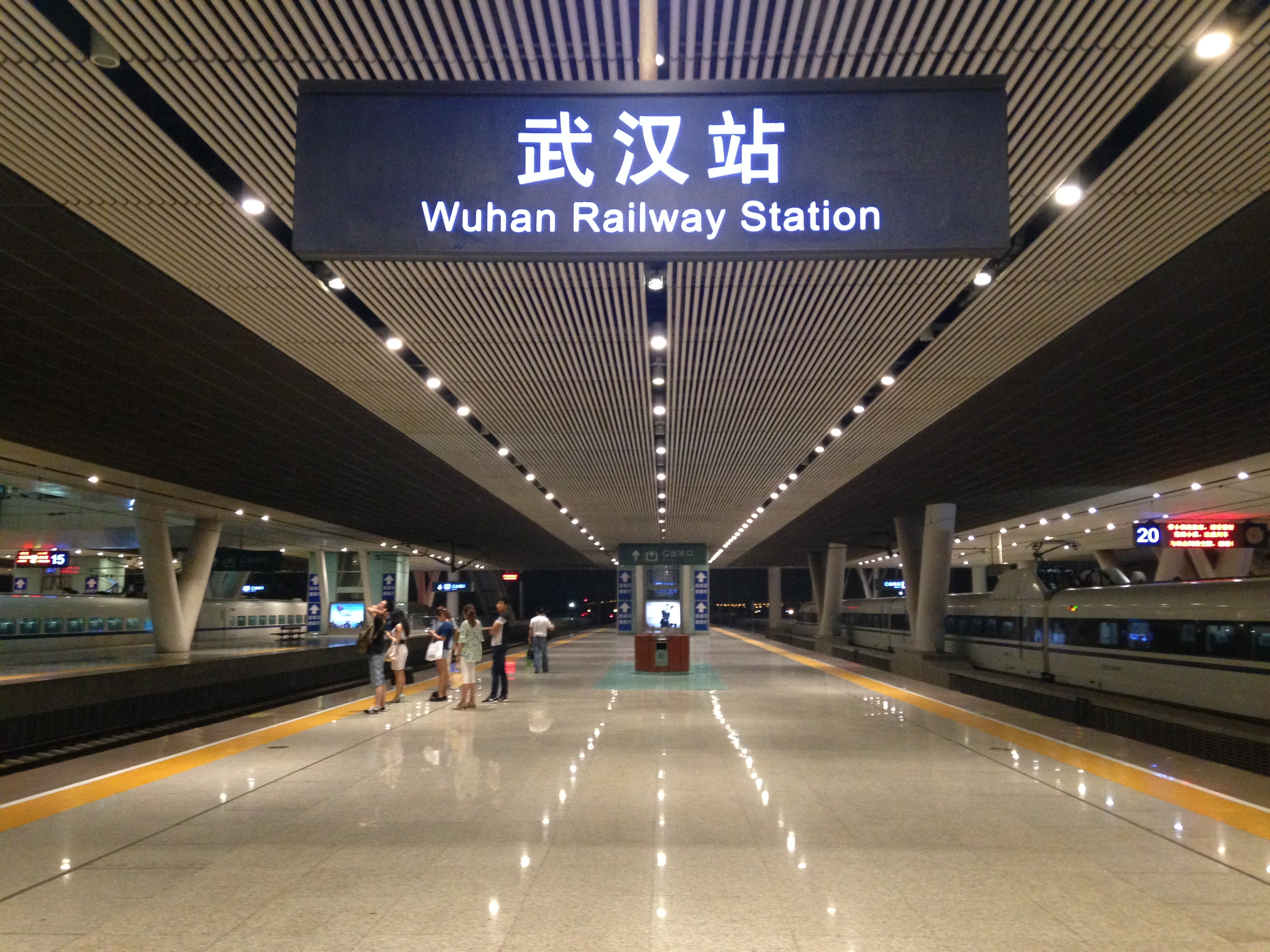
Platform at night

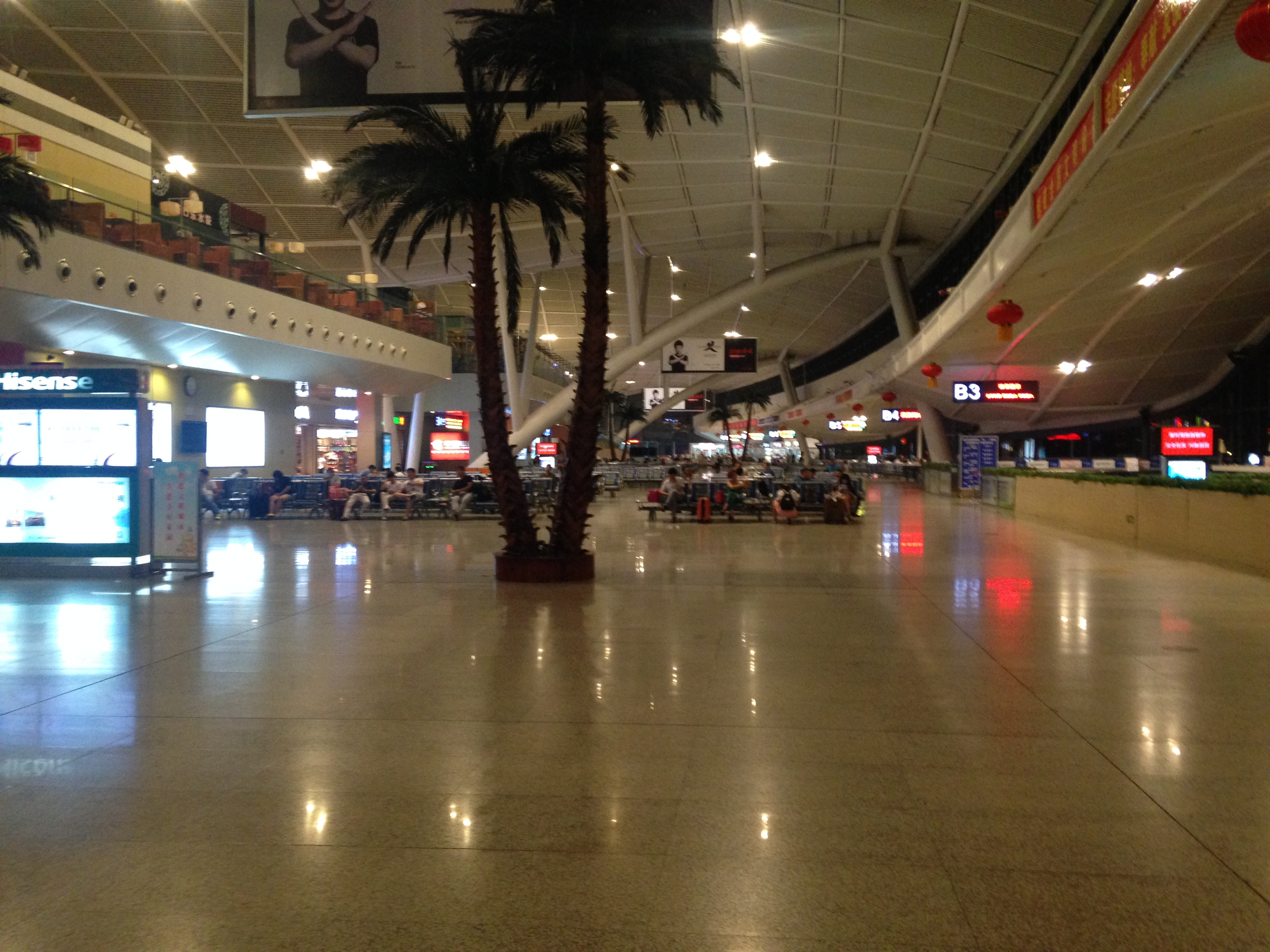
Waiting Area

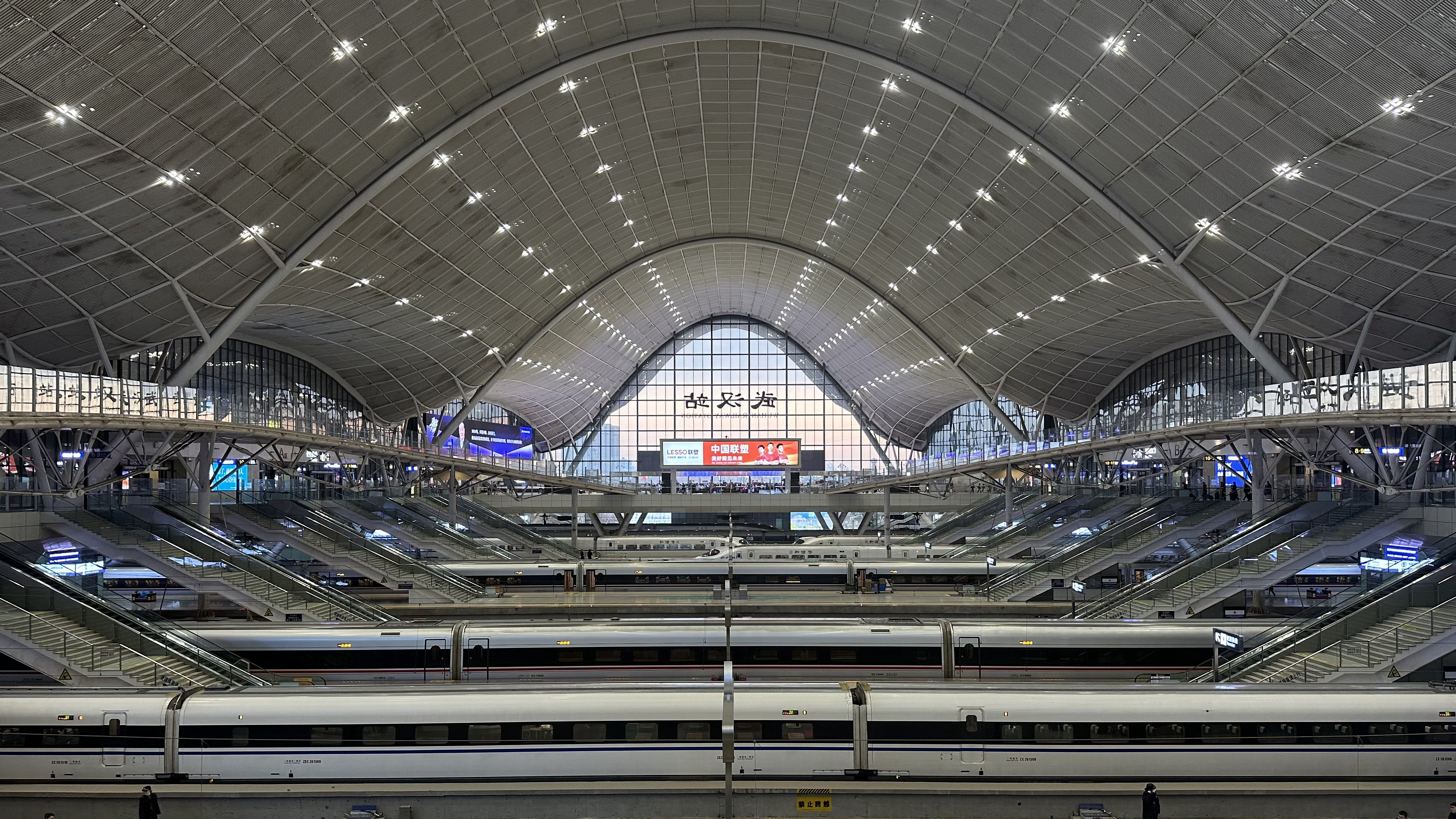
Atrium of Wuhan Railway Station February 2024

== Wuhan Metro ==
=== Wuhan Railway Station ===
Wuhan Railway Station 武汉火车站 4
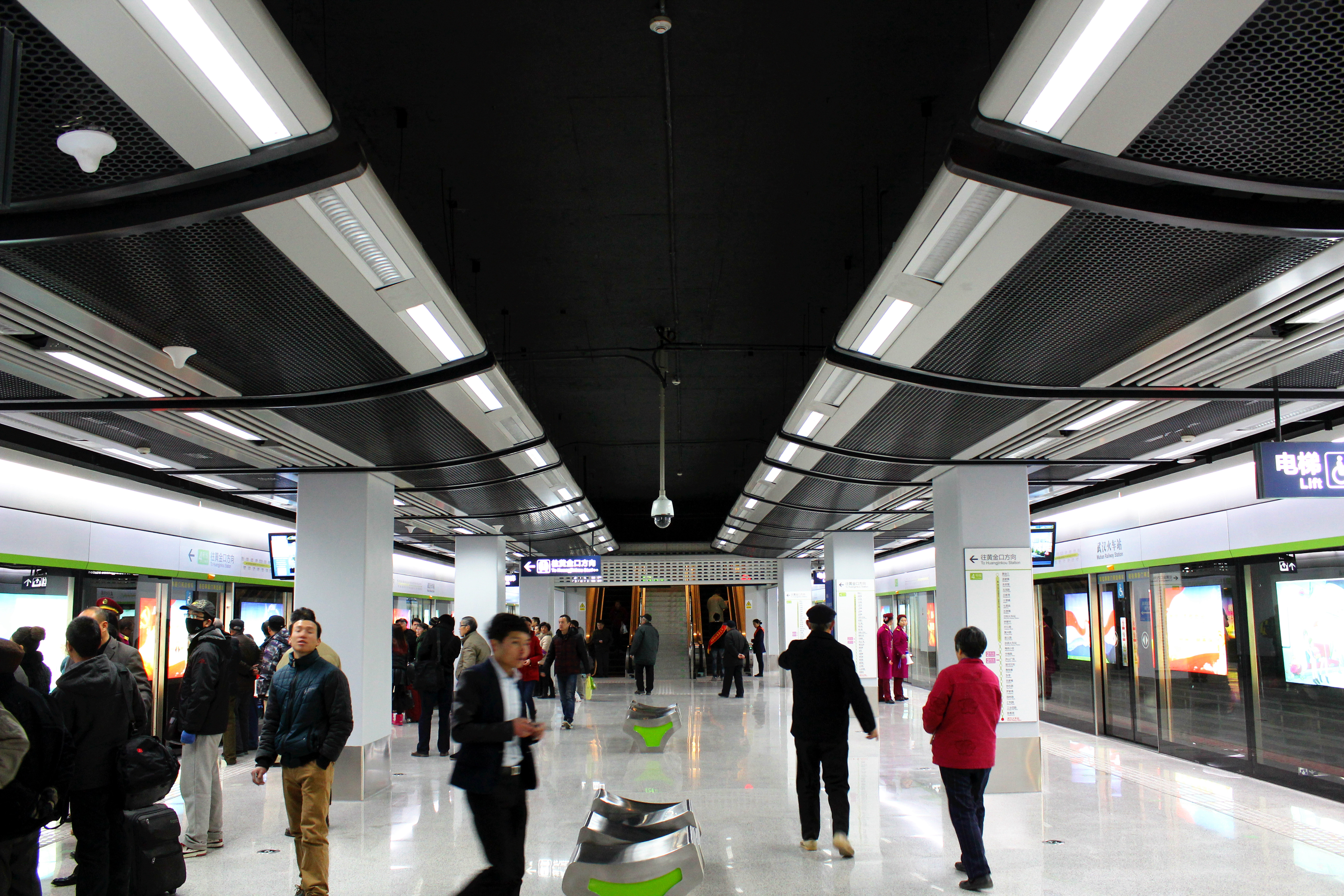

General information
- Location: Hongshan District, Wuhan, Hubei; China
- Operated by: Wuhan Metro Co., Ltd
- Line: Line 4
- Platforms: 2 (1 island platform)

Construction
- Structure type: Underground

History
- Opened: December 28, 2013 (Line 4)

Services
Preceding station	Wuhan Metro	Following station
Yangchunhu towards Bailin	Line 4	Terminus
Location

Wuhan Railway Station (Chinese: 武汉火车站) is a station of Line 4 of Wuhan Metro, and is the eastern terminus of Line 4. It entered revenue service on December 28, 2013. It is located in Hongshan District and it serves Wuhan railway station.

==== Station layout ====
G	Concourse	Faregates, Station Agent
B1	Westbound	← Line 4 towards Bailin (Yangchunhu)
B1	Island platform, doors will open on the left
B1	Eastbound	Line 4 termination platform →

==== Gallery ====
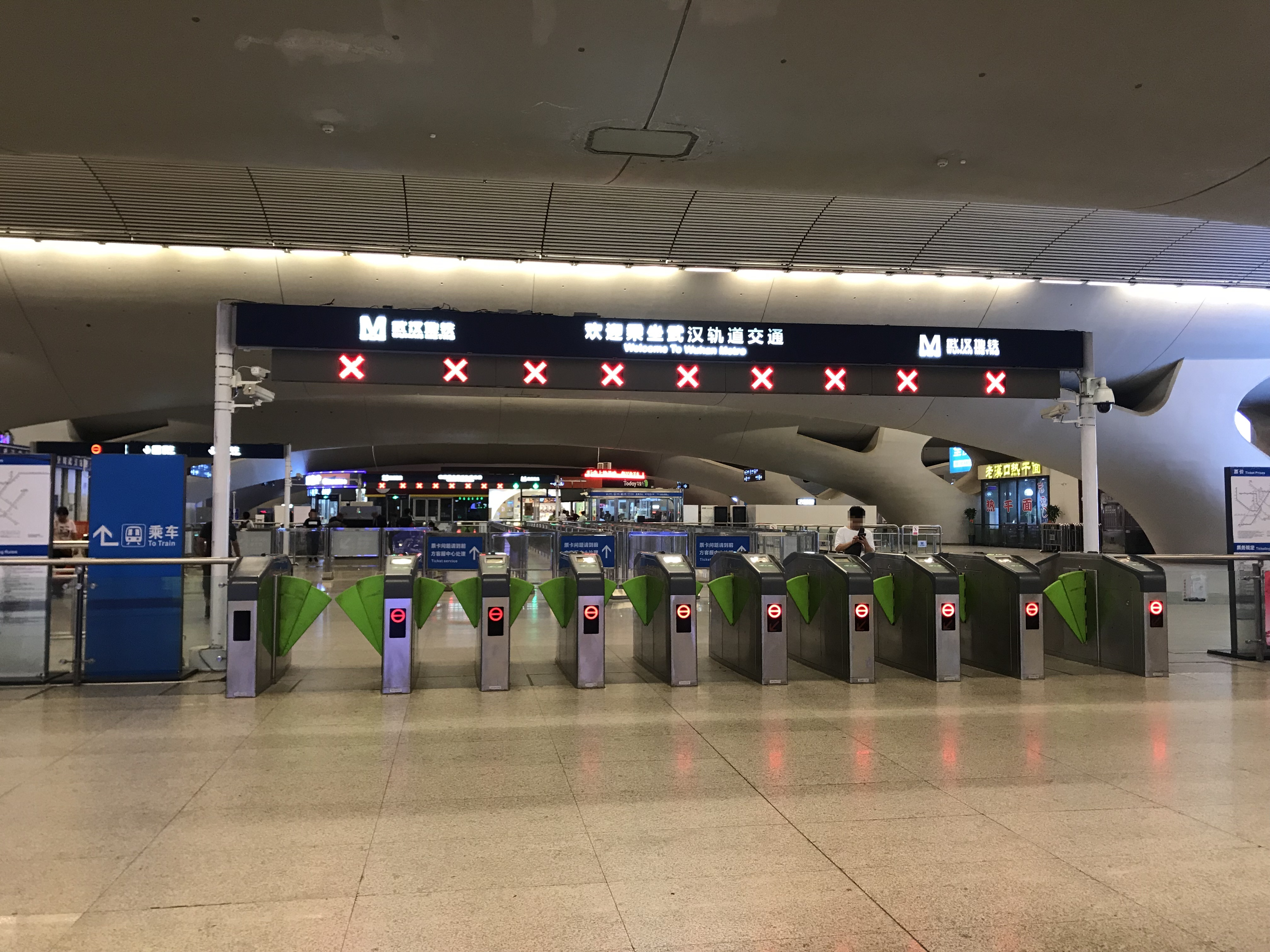
Concourse

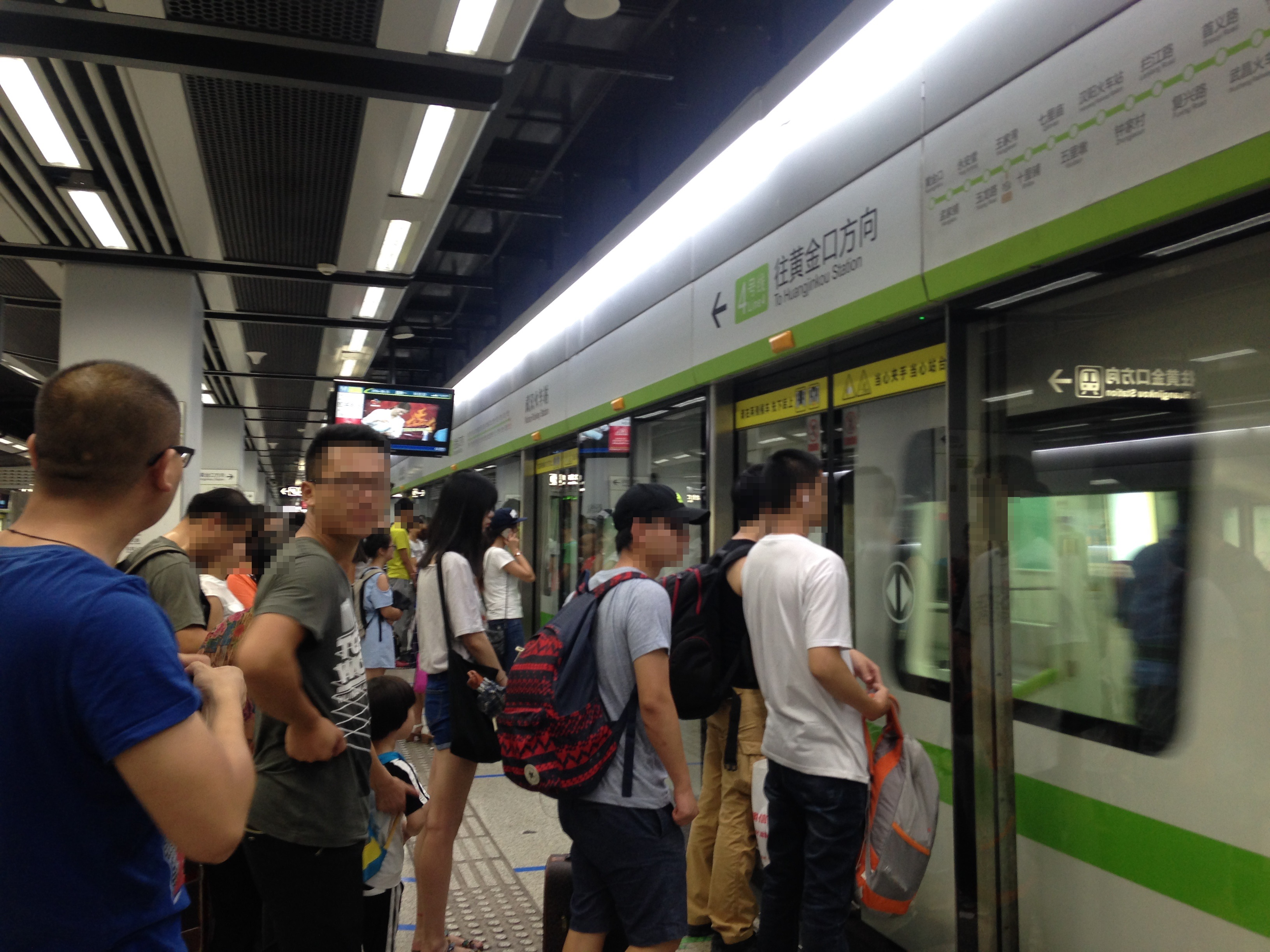
Platform

=== East Square station ===
East Square of Wuhan Railway Station 武汉站东广场 5
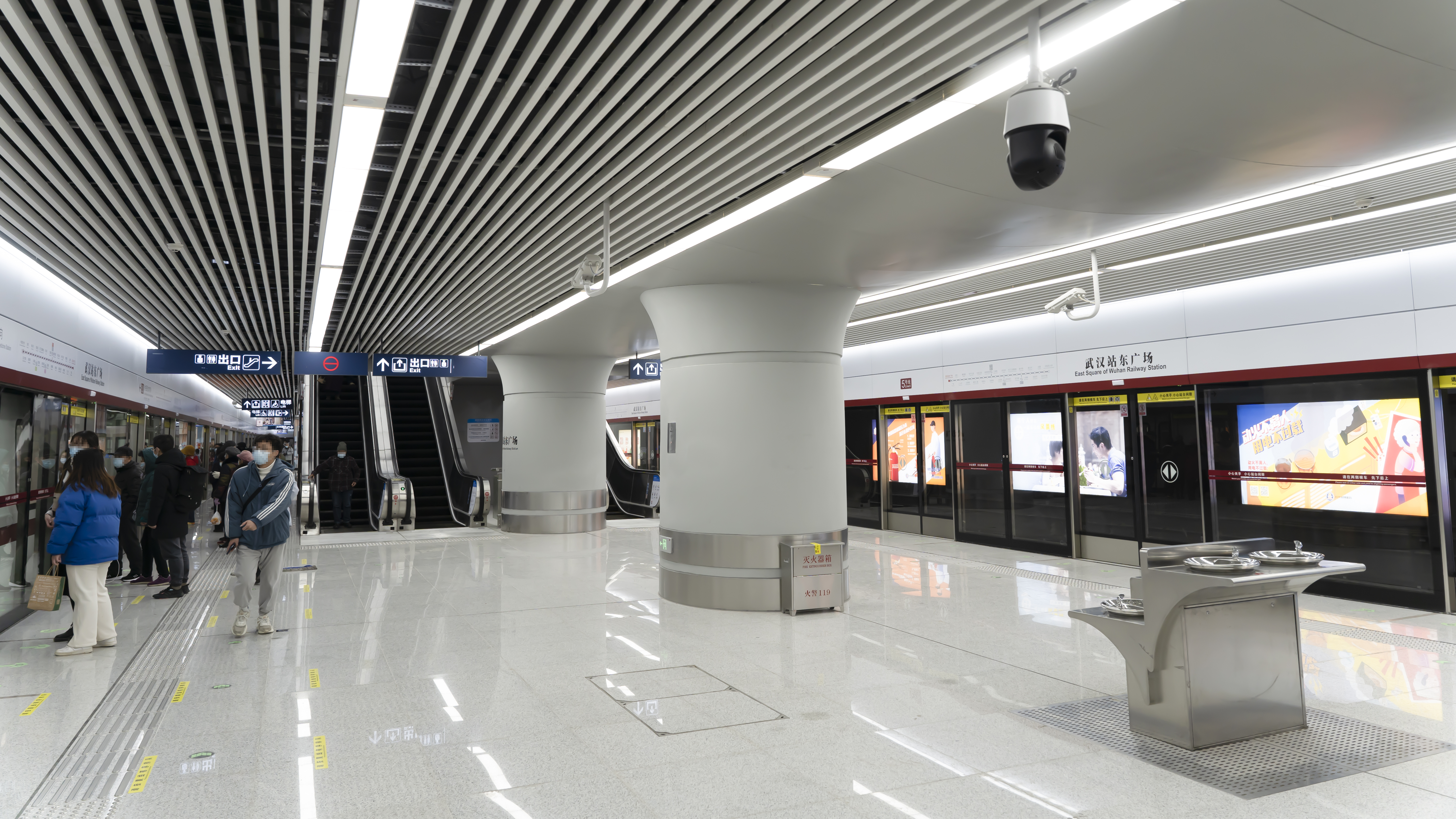

General information
- Location: Hongshan District, Wuhan, Hubei; China
- Operated by: Wuhan Metro Co., Ltd
- Line: Line 5
- Platforms: 2 (1 island platform)

Construction
- Structure type: Underground

History
- Opened: December 26, 2021

Services
Preceding station	Wuhan Metro	Following station
Terminus	Line 5	Changqian towards Hongxia
Location

East Square of Wuhan Railway Station (Chinese: 武汉站东广场) is a metro station for Line 5. It opened on December 26, 2021.

The station is located underneath the East Square of the railway station with three floors. The length of the platform is 241 metres (791 ft), and there are a total of three exits.

==== Gallery ====
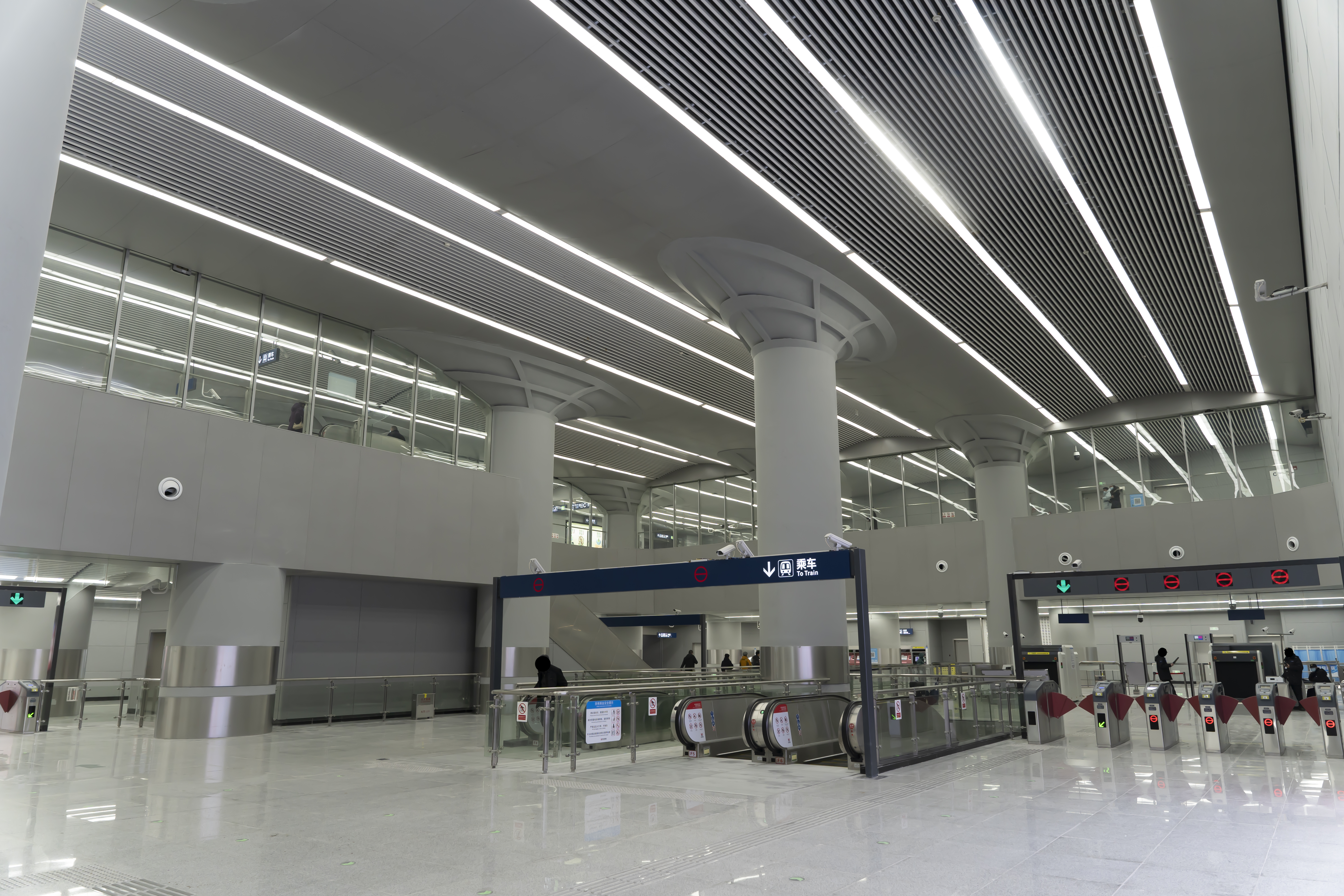
Concourse

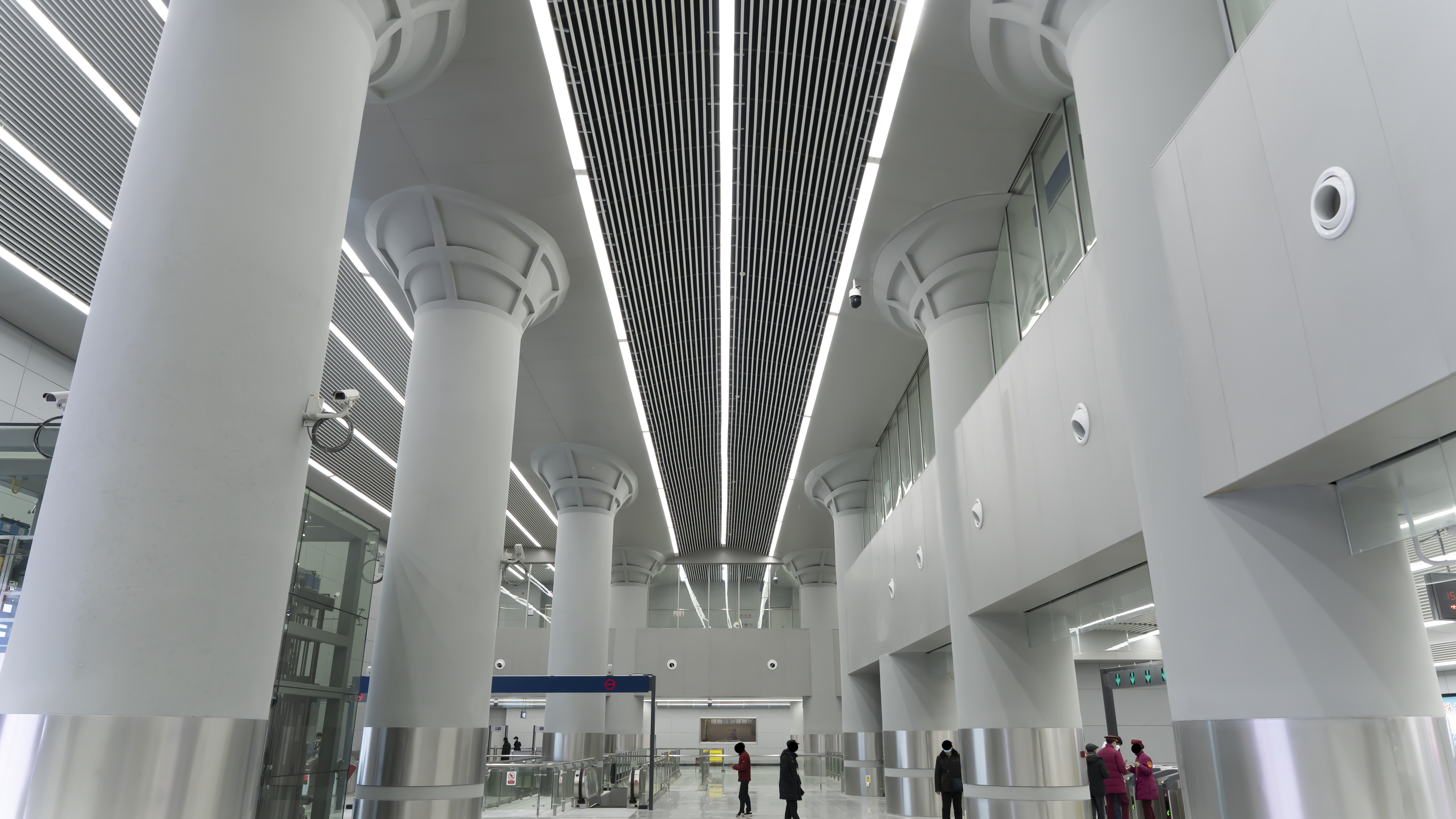
Concourse

=== West Square station ===
West Square of Wuhan Railway Station 武汉站西广场 19
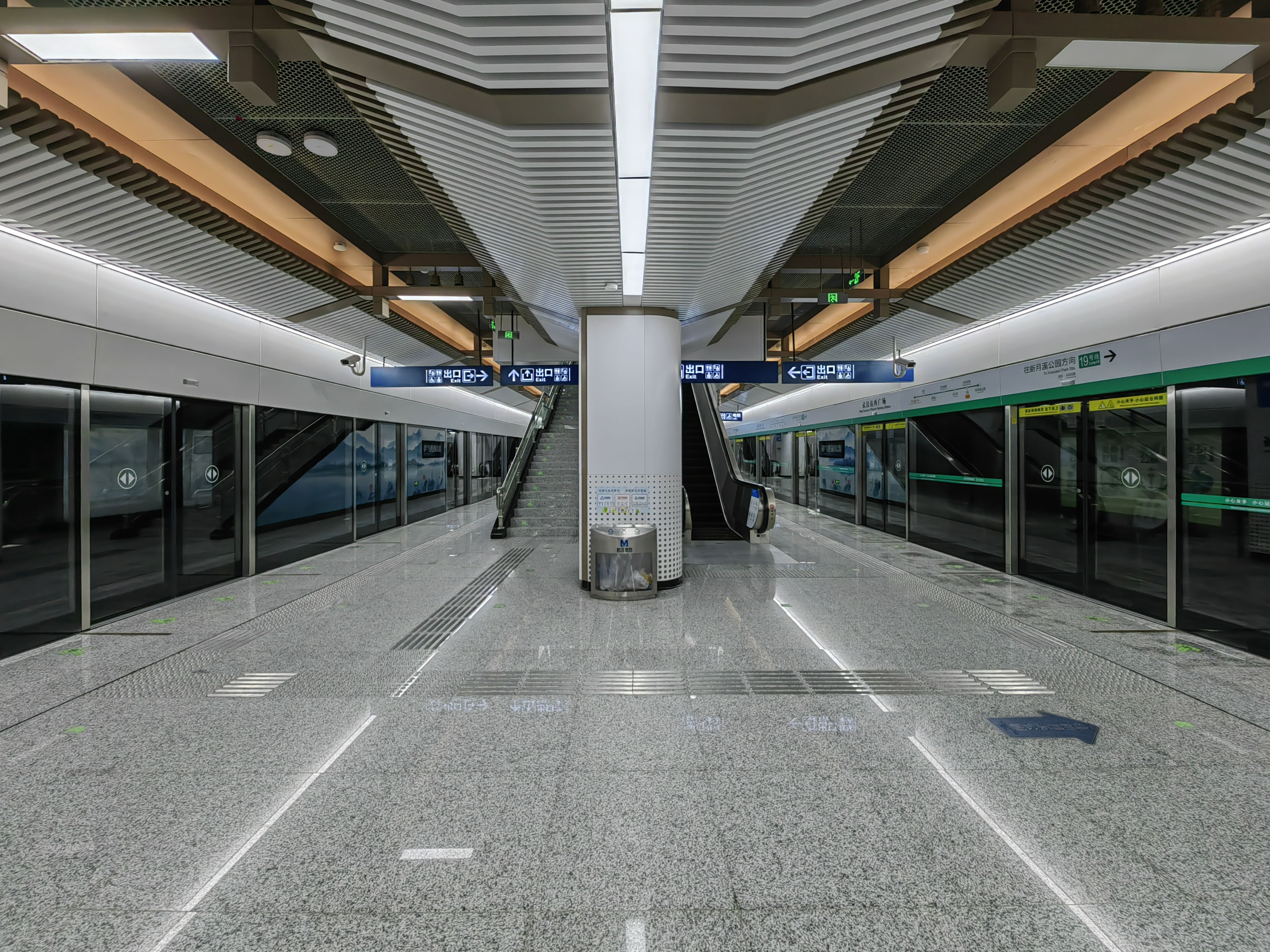

General information
- Location: Hongshan District, Wuhan, Hubei; China
- Operated by: Wuhan Metro Co., Ltd
- Line: Line 19
- Platforms: 2 (1 island platform)

Construction
- Structure type: Underground

History
- Opened: December 30, 2023

Services
Preceding station	Wuhan Metro	Following station
Terminus	Line 19	Wudong towards Xinyuexi Park
Location

West Square of Wuhan Railway Station (Chinese: 武汉站西广场) is a metro station for Line 19 of the Wuhan Metro and the western terminus of Line 19. It was unveiled on December 12, 2023.

The station features a replica statue of the Bianzhong of Marquis Yi of Zeng. According to Associate Professor Gong Qian of the Hubei Institute of Fine Arts, it is flanked on both sides by two statues of bianzhongs from the Qing Dynasty.
