= Shijiazhuang–Wuhan high-speed railway =

Railway line in China

Beijing–Guangzhou–Shenzhen–Hong Kong high-speed railway Shijiazhuang–Wuhan section
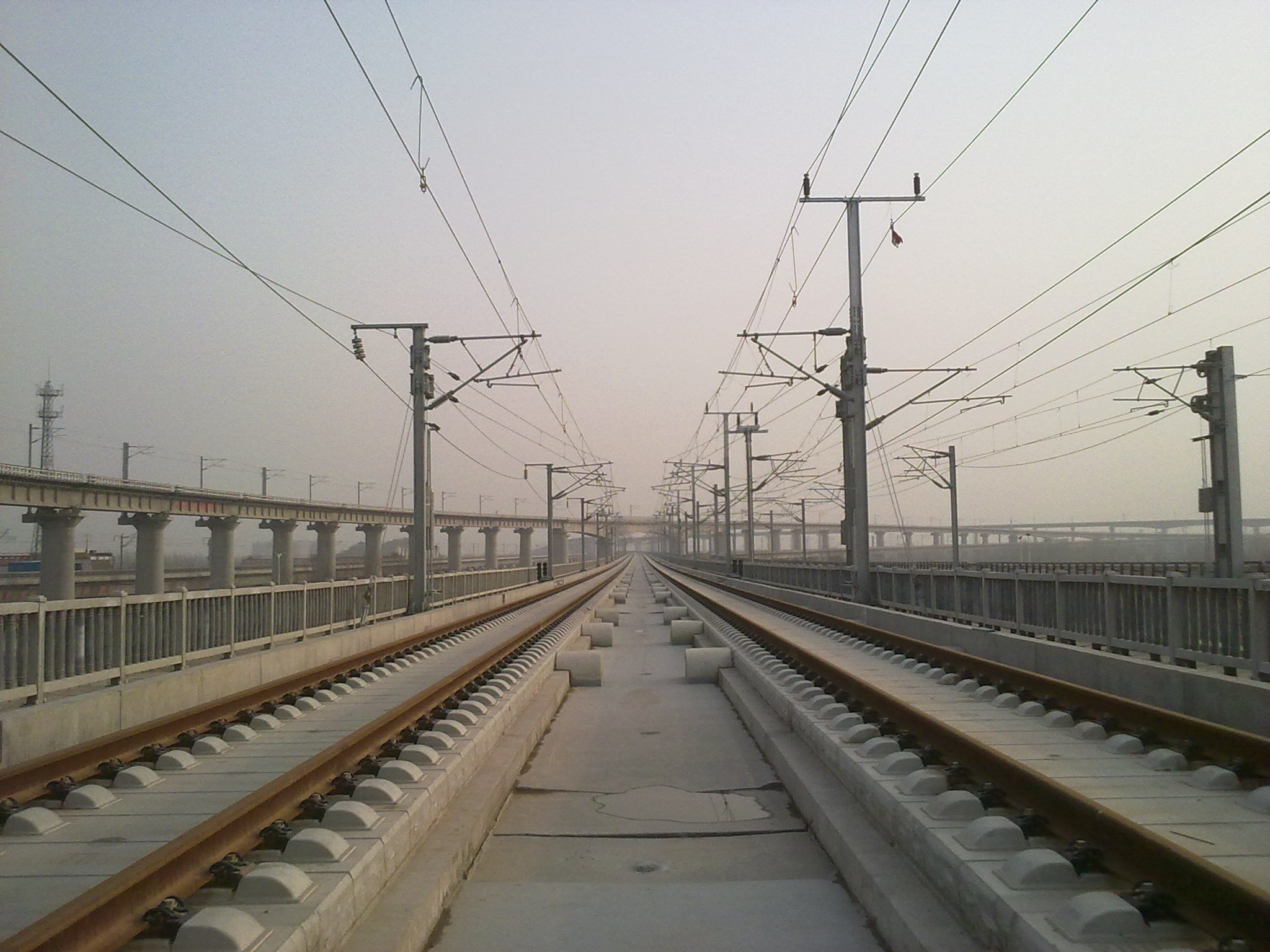
- The section under overhead catenary lines stringing (in this image, it is now done with stringing equipment intact) and stringing of overhead catenary feeder lines

Overview
- Native name: 京广深港高速铁路石武段
- Status: Operational
- Owner: CR Beijing; CR Zhengzhou; CR Wuhan
- Locale: Hebei province; Henan province; Hubei province
- Termini: Shijiazhuang; Wuhan Hankou
- Stations: 16

Service
- Type: High-speed rail
- System: China Railway High-speed
- Operator(s): CR Beijing; CR Zhengzhou; CR Wuhan

History
- Opened: 28 September 2012

Technical
- Line length: 840 km (522 mi)
- Number of tracks: 2 (Double-track)
- Track gauge: 1,435 mm (4 ft 8 1/2 in) standard gauge
- Electrification: 25 kV 50 Hz AC (Overhead line)
- Operating speed: 350 km/h (220 mph)
- Maximum incline: 2%
Route map

The Shijiazhuang–Wuhan high-speed railway, or Shiwu passenger railway (simplified Chinese: 石武客运专线; traditional Chinese: 石武客運專線; pinyin: Shíwǔ Kèyùn Zhuān Xiàn), is an 840 km (520 mi) high-speed rail line operated by China Railway High-speed between Shijiazhuang and Wuhan, the provincial capitals of Hebei and Hubei, respectively. Construction commenced in October 2008, with a total investment of 116.76 billion yuan. The design speed is 350 km/h (220 mph). It is part of the Jingguang passenger-dedicated line, a high-speed railway connecting Beijing and Guangzhou, which runs parallel to the older conventional Jingguang Railway.

The railway crosses the Yangtze in Wuhan over the Tianxingzhou Bridge, which was opened in December 2009.

Track-laying commenced on 29 November 2010.

Early on, it was reported that the Zhengzhou-Wuhan section was to enter service on 1 July 2012; however, later on the date was moved back to the end of September 2012. Trial runs on this section began on 26 August. The line was put into service on 28 September 2012 between Zhengzhou and Wuhan, a distance of 536 km (333 mi).

As of its opening day, published schedules show a number of G-series trains running from the new Zhengzhou East railway station via Wuhan to Guangzhou. There are also some G-series trains from Wuhan to Zhengzhou railway station, where a convenient connection to the frequent service on the Zhengzhou–Xi'an high-speed railway is possible. A few direct trains from Xi'an North railway station to Guangzhou South and Shenzhen North (e.g. G824/G821 via Zhengzhou or G838/G835 via Zhengzhou East), over the Zhengzhou–Xi'an high-speed railway and the Shijiazhiuang-Wuhan-Guangzhou line, have been introduced as well.

The entire Shijiazhuang–Wuhan line was put into service by the end of 2012.

Although the railway's southern end point is notionally Wuhan railway station, a small number of high-speed trains from Beijing terminate at Hankou railway station instead. This is convenient for trains to transfer to the Shanghai–Wuhan–Chengdu high-speed railway, e.g. for passengers traveling toward Yichang, Chongqing or Chengdu.
