= Beijing–Guangdong high-speed train =

High-speed train service in China

Beijing–Guangdong high-speed train 京粤高速动车组列车
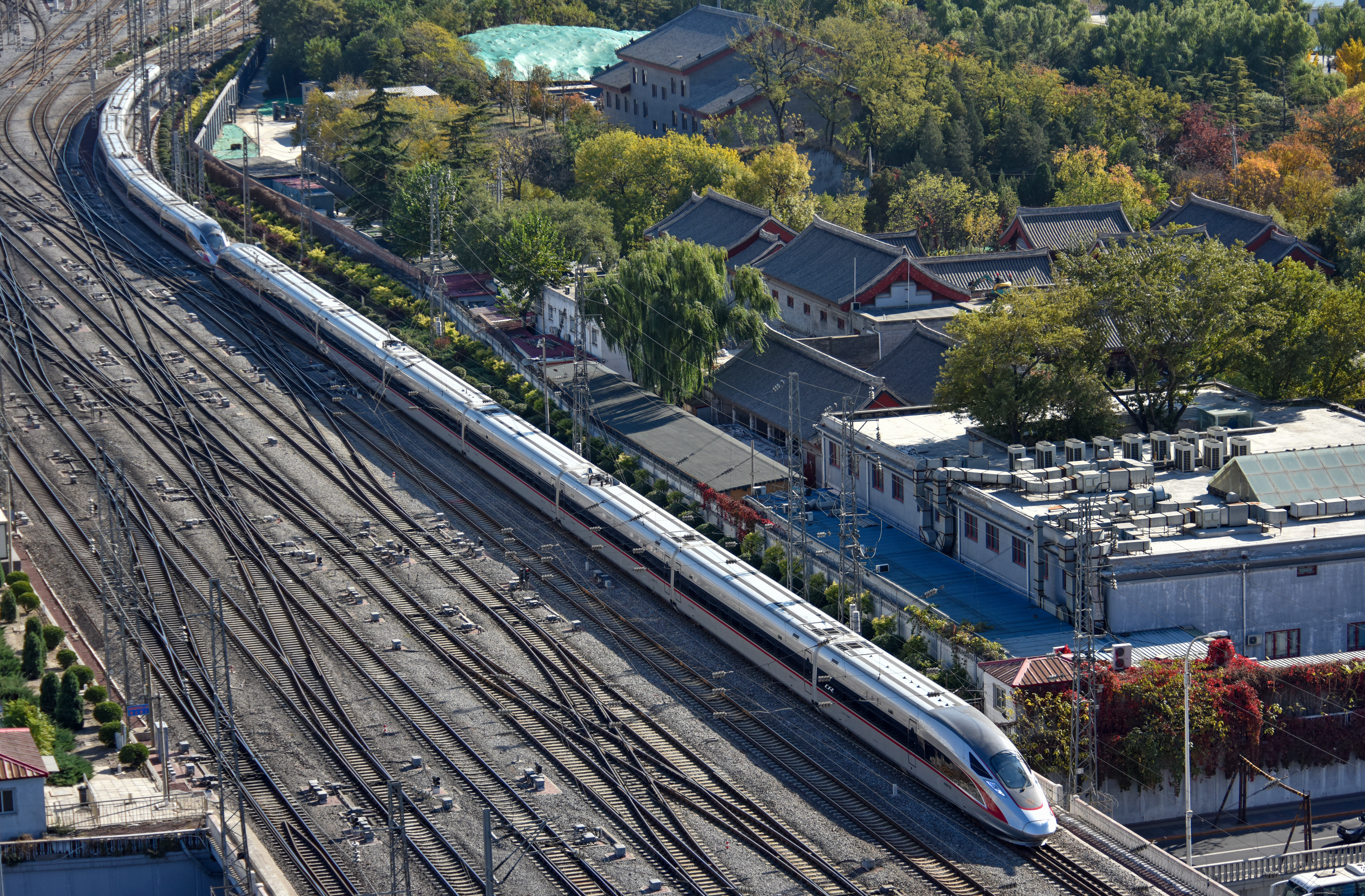
- A double-headed CR400AF EMU on G65 service near Beijing West

Overview
- Service type: G-series trains
- Status: Operational
- Locale: China
- First service: 26 December 2012
- Current operator(s): CR Beijing

Route
- Termini: Beijing West: Guangzhou South; Futian; Zhuhai
- Distance travelled: 2,298 kilometres (1,428 mi) (Beijing West–Guangzhou South); 2,409 kilometres (1,497 mi) (Beijing West–Futian); 2,414 kilometres (1,500 mi) (Beijing West–Zhuhai)
- Average journey time: 10h 55m (G65); 8h (G66); 9h 45m (G67); 10h 59m (G68); 9h 21m (G69); 9h 38m (G70); 10h 36m (G71); 11h 22m (G72)
- Service frequency: 2 daily (Beijing West–Guangzhou South); Daily (Beijing West–Futian); Daily (Beijing West–Zhuhai)
- Train number(s): G65 (Beijing West → Zhuhai); G68 (Zhuhai → Beijing West); G67/69 (Beijing West → Guangzhou South); G66/70 (Guangzhou South → Beijing West); G71 (Beijing West → Futian); G72 (Futian → Beijing West)
- Line(s) used: Beijing–Guangzhou–Shenzhen–Hong Kong HSR, Guangzhou–Zhuhai ICR

On-board services
- Class(es): Business seat; First class seat; Second class seat
- Catering facilities: Dining car; Trolley refreshment service

Technical
- Rolling stock: CRH380AL, CR400AF
- Track gauge: 1,435 mm (4 ft 8 1/2 in)
- Operating speed: 300 km/h
- Track owner(s): China Railway

The Beijing–Guangdong high-speed train (京粤高速动车组列车) is a high-speed train service operated by China Railway Beijing Group (CR Beijing) on Beijing–Guangzhou–Shenzhen–Hong Kong HSR in China. Currently, 3 pairs of trains are operated daily between Beijing West and Guangzhou South with train numbers G77/78, G339/340, and G1579/1580; 1 pair of trains daily between Beijing West and Futian in Shenzhen with train numbers G335/336; 1 pair of trains daily between Beijing West and Zhuhai with train numbers G337/338, and 1 pair of trains daily between Beijing West and Hong Kong West Kowloon with train numbers G79/80.

== History ==
The high-speed train services between Beijing and Guangzhou date back to 26 December 2012, when the Beijing–Zhengzhou section of the Beijing–Guangzhou–Shenzhen–Hong Kong HSR was opened. At the initial stage, 2 pairs of trains were operated daily between Beijing West and Guangzhou South with train numbers G79/82 and G80/81.

The G71/72 trains also started service between Beijing West and Shenzhen North from 26 December 2012.

On 28 December 2013, the southern terminus of the G79/82 service was extended to Shenzhen North and the train number of the Shenzhen-bound service was changed from G82 to G80. The former G80/81 service between Beijing West and Guangzhou South had the train numbers changed to G66/69 and 2 more pairs of trains (G65/68 and G67/70) between Beijing West and Guangzhou South started services. After the adjustment, there were 3 pairs of trains operating daily between Beijing West and Guangzhou South (G65/68, G66/69 and G67/70), and 2 pairs of trains between Beijing West and Shenzhen North (G71/72 and G79/80).

On 5 January 2017, the G71/72 and G79/80 services were extended to Futian.

With the inauguration of the Guangzhou–Shenzhen–Hong Kong XRL Hong Kong section on 23 September 2018, the G79/80 service was extended to Hong Kong West Kowloon, and became the fastest train service between Beijing and Hong Kong (see Beijing–Hong Kong High-Speed Train).

On 10 July 2019, the G65/68 service was extended to Zhuhai.

(Note that G80 and G79 between Hong Kong and Beijing, via Shenzhen and Guangzhou, are staffed by CR Guangzhou, not CR Beijing)

== Operations ==
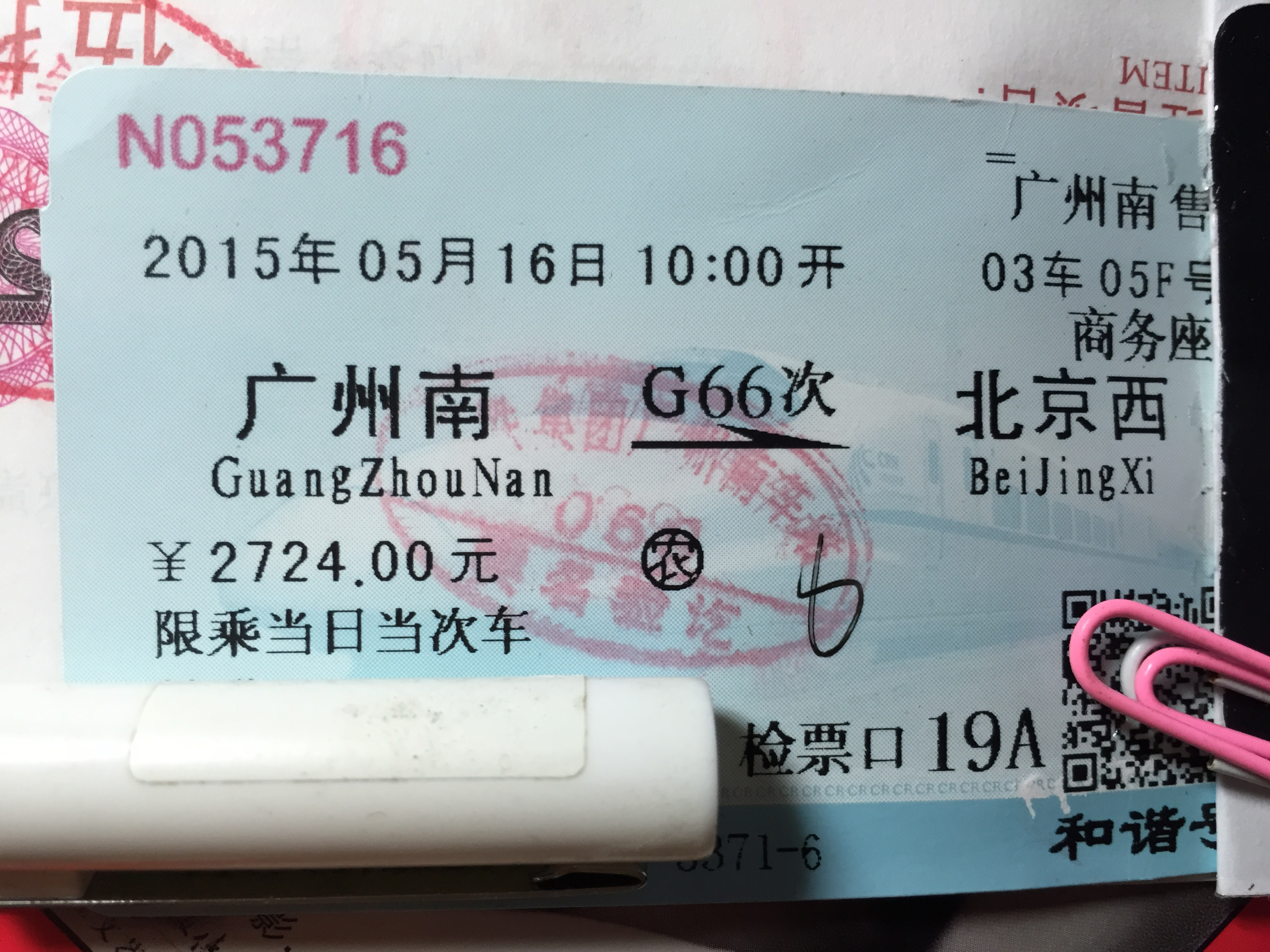
A business seat ticket of Train G66

Train G66 only stop at stations of province capitals and is thus the fastest train service from Guangzhou to Beijing, with a travelling time of 8 hours. The train is also called as the "benchmark train" (Chinese: 标杆车).

- ●: stop at the station
- ↓ or ↑: pass the station
- —: out of service range
- : Benchmark train

G65	G67	G69	G71	Stops	G66	G68	G70	G72
●	●	●	●	Beijing West	●	●	●	●
↓	↓	↓	●	Zhuozhou East	↑	↑	●	↑
↓	↓	●	↓	Gaobeidian East	↑	↑	↑	↑
●	●	↓	●	Baoding East	↑	↑	●	●
↓	↓	●	↓	Dingzhou East	↑	↑	↑	↑
↓	●	↓	↓	Zhengding Airport	↑	↑	↑	↑
●	●	●	●	Shijiazhuang	●	●	●	●
●	●	↓	●	Xingtai East	↑	↑	↑	●
↓	●	●	●	Handan East	↑	↑	●	↑
●	↓	↓	↓	Anyang East	↑	●	●	●
↓	↓	↓	●	Hebi East	↑	●	↑	↑
↓	●	↓	●	Xinxiang East	↑	↑	↑	↑
●	●	●	●	Zhengzhou East	●	●	●	●
●	●	↓	↓	Xuchang East	↑	↑	↑	↑
↓	●	↓	↓	Luohe West	↑	●	↑	●
↓	↓	●	●	Zhumadian West	↑	●	↑	●
↓	↓	↓	↓	Minggang East	↑	↑	●	↑
●	●	↓	↓	Xinyang East	↑	●	●	↑
↓	↓	↓	●	Xiaogan North	↑	↑	↑	↑
●	●	●	●	Wuhan	●	●	●	●
●	↓	↓	↓	Xianning North	↑	↑	↑	↑
↓	↓	↓	↓	Chibi North	↑	↑	●	↑
●	●	●	↓	Yueyang East	↑	●	↑	●
↓	↓	●	↓	Miluo East	↑	↑	↑	↑
●	●	●	●	Changsha South	●	●	●	●
↓	↓	↓	↓	Zhuzhou West	↑	●	↑	↑
●	●	↓	↓	Hengshan West	↑	↑	●	↑
↓	↓	●	●	Hengyang East	↑	↑	↑	●
↓	↓	↓	●	Leiyang West	↑	●	↑	↑
●	●	↓	↓	Chenzhou West	↑	↑	●	●
↓	↓	↓	●	Shaoguan	↑	●	●	●
↓	●	↓	↓	Yingde West	↑	↑	↑	↑
●	↓	↓	↓	Qingyuan	↑	↑	↑	↑
●	●	●	●	Guangzhou South	●	●	●	●
—	—	—	●	Humen	—	—	—	↑
—	—	—	●	Futian	—	—	—	●
↓	—	—	—	Zhongshan	—	●	—	—
●	—	—	—	Zhuhai	—	●	—	—

(Note that the Hong Kong / Beijing G79 and G80 trains are "benchmark" trains too but is not listed above)

== Train formation ==
The G66/69, G67/70 and G71/72 services are operated by 16-car CRH380AL trainsets with the formation shown below. The front and rear cars (Car 1 and 16) are for business seats together with 2+2 first class seats. Car 2 and 4 are first class car with 2+2 seating. Car 3 is for business seats only. Car 5-8 and 10-15 are for second class seats with 3+2 seating. Car 9 is the dining car.

Car No.	1	2	3	4	5	6-8	9	10-15	16
Type	ZYS; Business/first class	ZY; First class	SW; Business	ZY; First class	ZE; Second class	ZE; Second class	CA; Dining car	ZE; Second class	ZYS; Business/first class

The G65/68 service is operated by double-headed 8-car CR400AF trainsets (16 cars). The formation is shown below.

Car No.	1	2-3	4	5	6-7	8	9	10-11	12	13	14-15	16
Type	ZYS; Business/first class	ZE; Second class	ZE; Second class	ZEC; Second class/dining car	ZE; Second class	ZES; Business/second class	ZYS; Business/first class	ZE; Second class	ZE; Second class	ZEC; Second class/dining car	ZE; Second class	ZES; Business/second class

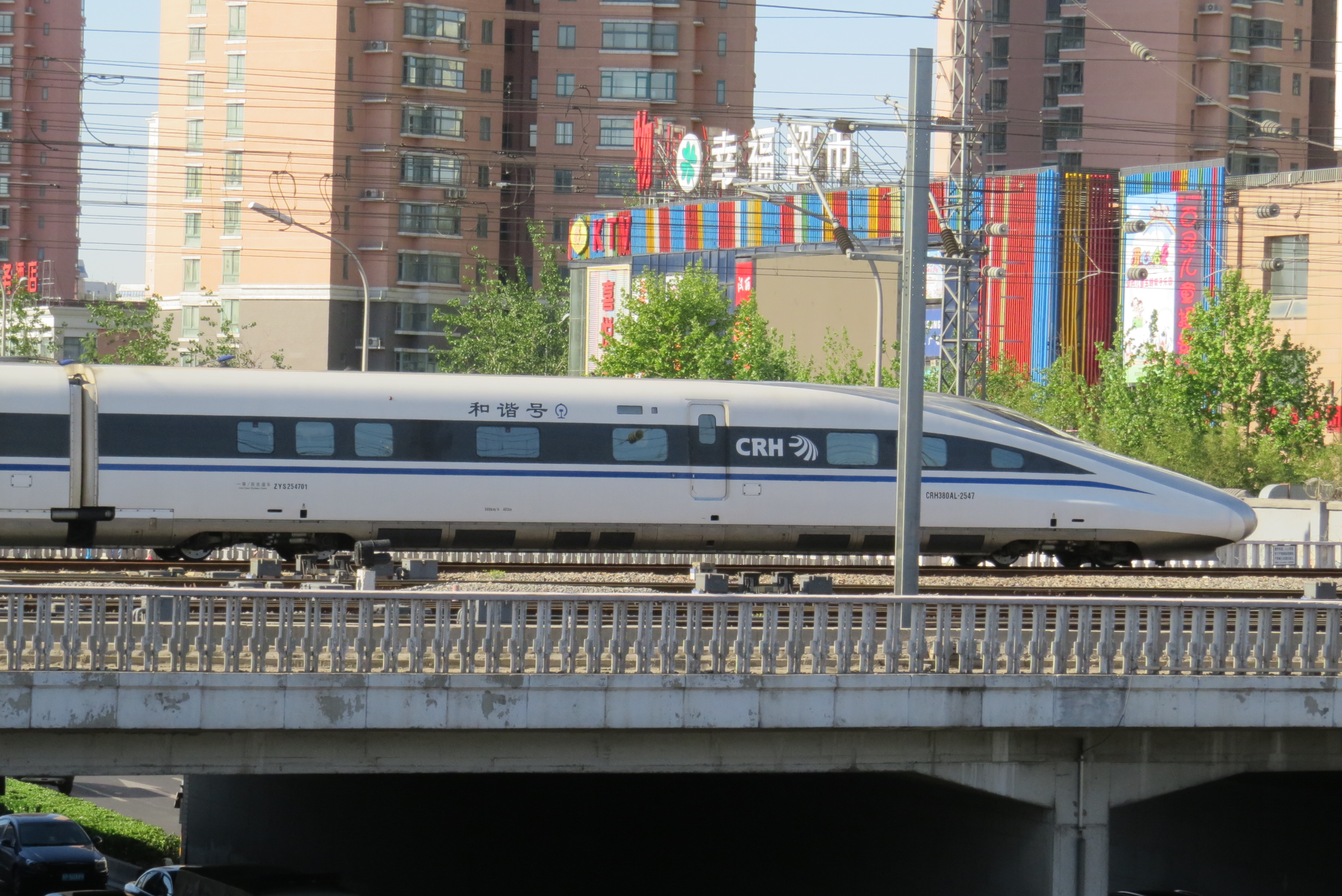
A CRH380AL on G71 service in May 2015

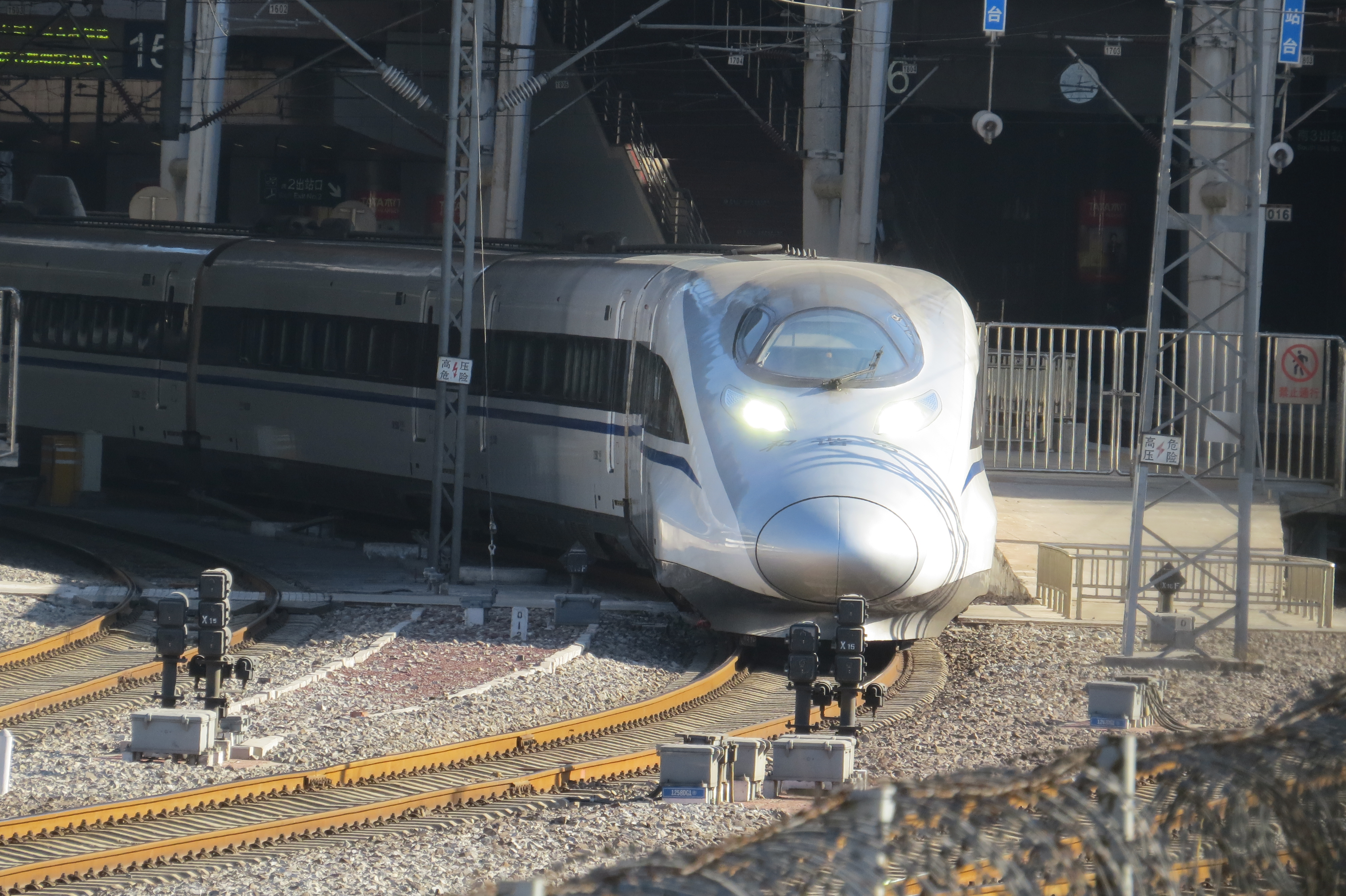
A CRH380AL on G67 service in Jan. 2016

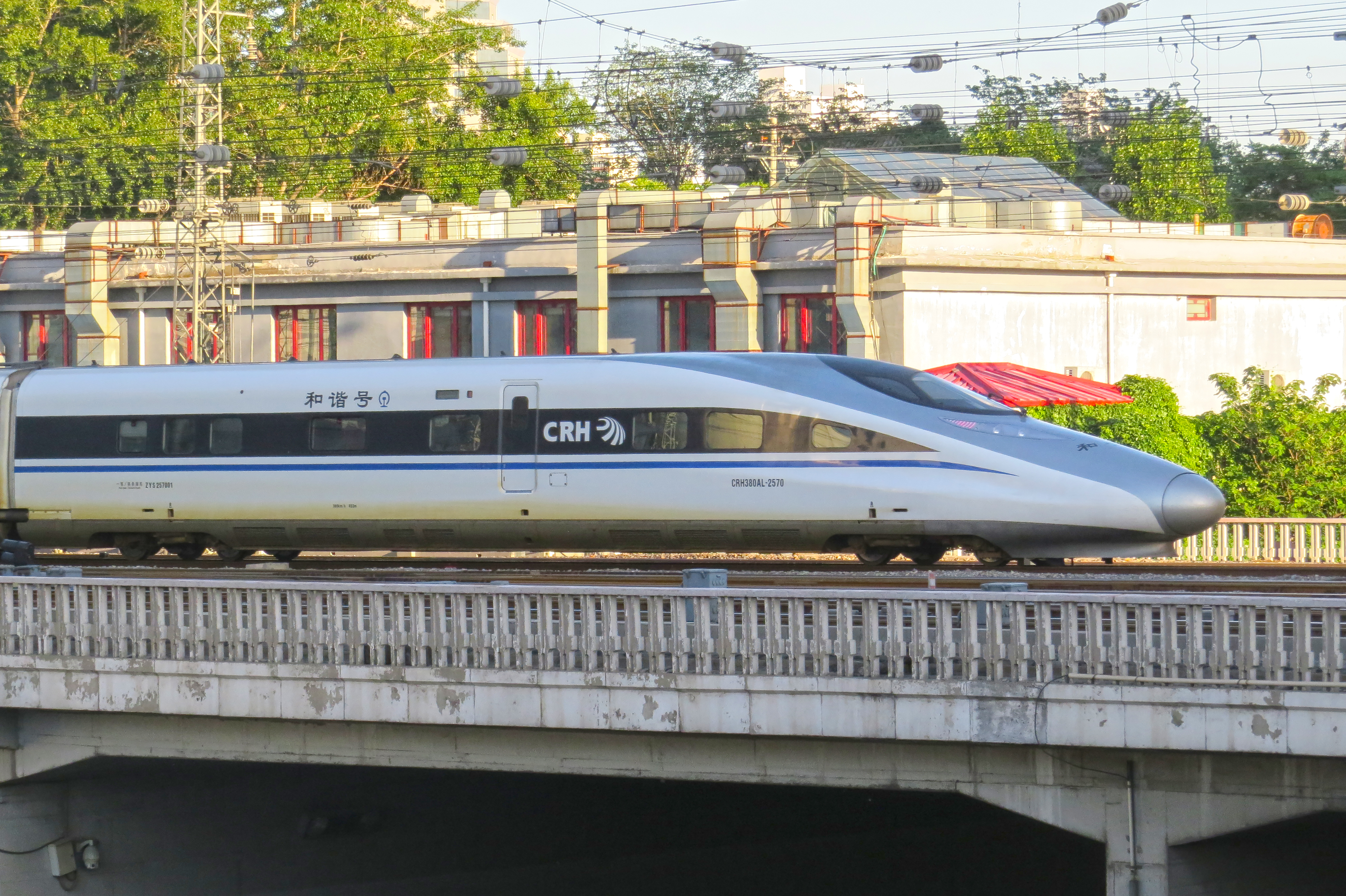
A CRH380AL on G66 service in May 2016

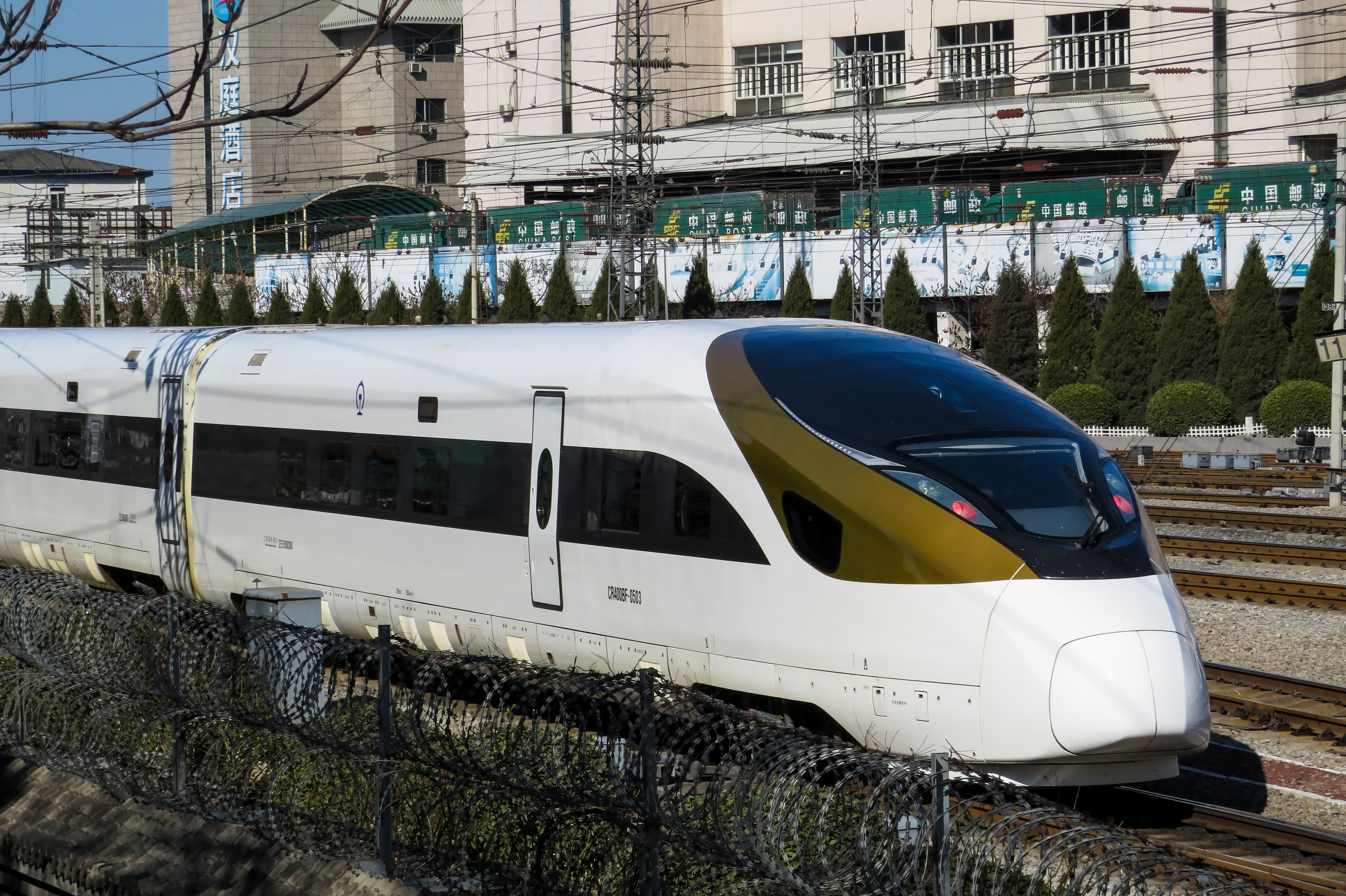
The prototype CR400BF on G65 service in Feb. 2017
