= Zhengzhou–Shenzhen high-speed train =

Railway service between Zhengzhou and Shenzhen, China

Zhengzhou–Shenzhen high-speed train 郑深高速动车组列车
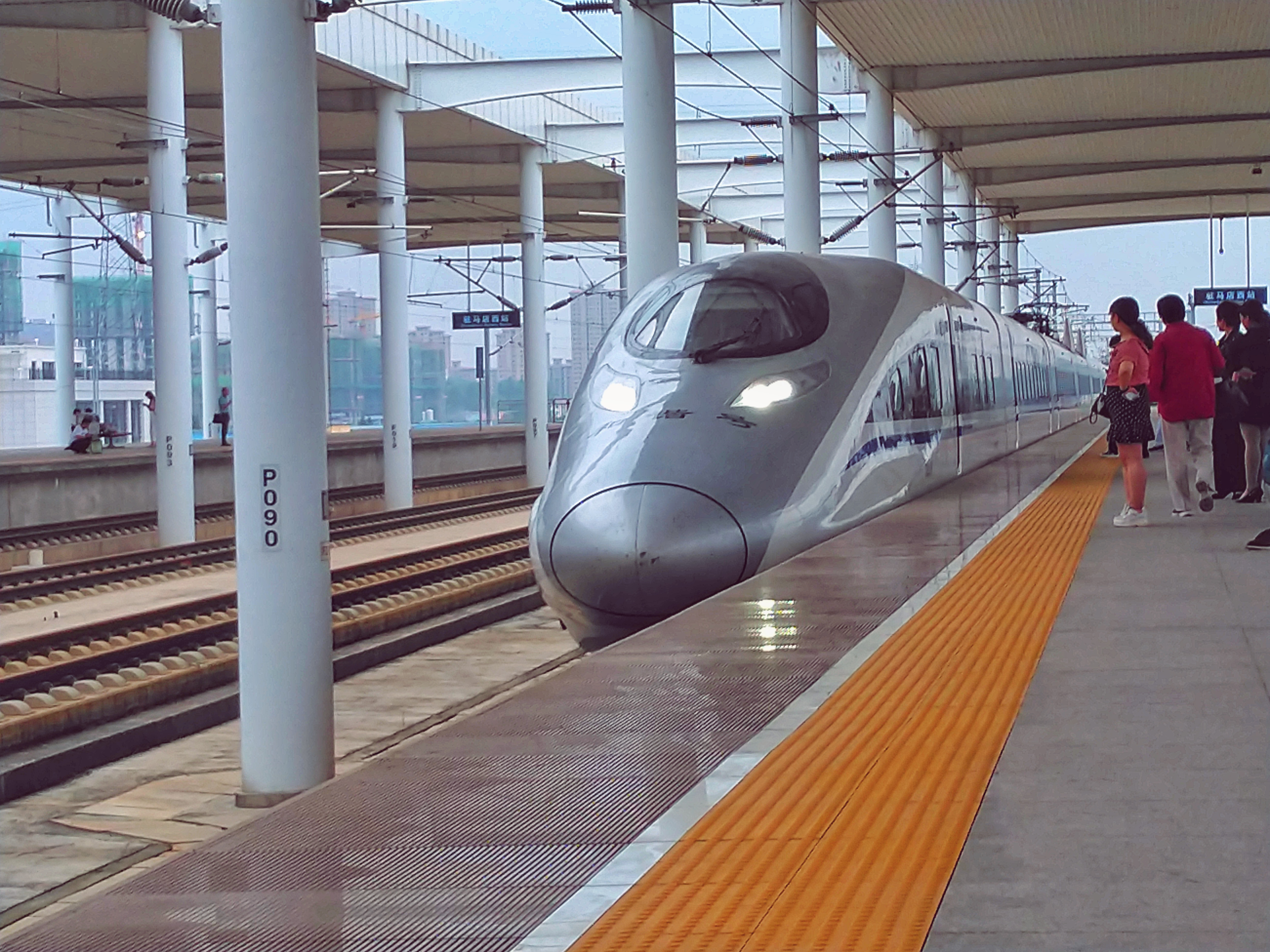
- Train G74 approaching Zhumadianxi railway station

Overview
- Service type: G-series trains
- Status: Operational
- Locale: China
- First service: 28 September 2012
- Current operator(s): CR Guangzhou; CR Zhengzhou

Route
- Termini: Zhengzhou East; Shenzhen North
- Distance travelled: 2,439 kilometres (1,516 mi)
- Average journey time: 6h 46m - 7h 20m
- Train number(s): G73 (Anyang East → Shenzhen North); G75 (Jiaozuo → Shenzhen North); G74/76 (Shenzhen North → Zhengzhou East)
- Line(s) used: Beijing–Guangzhou–Shenzhen–Hong Kong HSR

On-board services
- Class(es): Business seat; First class seat; Second class seat
- Catering facilities: Dining car; Trolley refreshment service

Technical
- Rolling stock: CRH380AL
- Track gauge: 1,435 mm (4 ft 8 1/2 in)
- Operating speed: 300 km/h
- Track owner(s): China Railway

The Zhengzhou–Shenzhen high-speed train (郑深高速动车组列车) are high-speed train services between Zhengzhou, the capital city of Henan Province, and Shenzhen, a major city in Guangdong Province.

== History ==
The service commenced operations on 28 September 2012, when the Zhengzhou–Wuhan section of the Beijing–Guangzhou–Shenzhen–Hong Kong HSR was put into operation.

== Operations ==
The services are operated on the Beijing–Guangzhou–Shenzhen–Hong Kong HSR and Zhengzhou–Jiaozuo ICR (G75 only).

The G73 train departs from Anyang East instead of Zhengzhou East, but it still takes Zhengzhou East as an intermediate stop, while G75 takes its intermediate stop at Zhengzhou railway station and doesn't go past Zhengzhou East. These trainsets go back to Zhengzhou East respectively as G76 and G74.

G73	G75	Stops	G74	G76
●	—	Anyang East	—	—
—	●	Jiaozuo	—	—
—	●	Zhengzhou	—	—
●	—	Zhengzhou East	●	●
●	●	Xuchang East	●	●
●	●	Luohe West	●	●
↓	●	Zhumadian West	●	↑
↓	●	Minggang East	↑	↑
●	●	Xinyang East	●	●
●	●	Wuhan	●	●
↓	●	Yueyang East	●	↑
↓	↓	Miluo East	●	↑
●	●	Changsha South	●	●
↓	●	Zhuzhou West	↑	↑
↓	●	Hengyang East	↑	●
↓	↓	Leiyang West	●	↑
●	↓	Chenzhou West	●	●
●	●	Shaoguan	↑	↑
↓	↓	Yingde West	●	↑
↓	↓	Qingyuan	↑	●
●	●	Guangzhou South	●	●
↓	●	Humen	●	●
●	●	Shenzhen North	●	●

Note:

- ●: stop at the station
- ↓ or ↑: pass the station
- —: out of service range

== Rolling stocks ==
The services are operated by CRH380AL trainsets.

=== CRH380AL ===
The G75/G74 service is operated by 16-car CRH380AL trainsets of CR Zhengzhou while the G76/G73 service uses the same type of trainsets of CR Guangzhou. The front and rear cars (Car 1 and 16) are for business seats together with 2+2 first class seats. Car 2-3 are first class car with 2+2 seating. Car 4-8 and 10-15 are for second class seats with 3+2 seating. Car 9 is the dining car.

Car No.	1	2-3	4	5	6-8	9	10-15	16
Type	ZYS; Business/first class	ZY; First class	ZE; Second class	ZE; Second class	ZE; Second class	CA; Dining car	ZE; Second class	ZYS; Business/first class

=== Previously rolling stocks used by G76/G73 (in chronological order) ===
- CRH3C
- CRH380B
- CRH380A

== Other services ==
The services between Shenzhen and Beijing (G71/72), Shijiazhuang (G531/532), Jinan (G279/280) and Xi'an (G817/818/821/822/825/826/839/840), and between Beijing and Hong Kong (G79/80), also provide services between Zhengzhou and Shenzhen.
