= YYD =

YYD may refer to:

- Smithers Airport, British Columbia, Canada, IATA code YYD
- Yueyang East railway station, Hubei, China, Pinyin code YYD
