= MQQ =

MQQ or mqq may refer to:

- MQQ, the IATA code for Moundou Airport, Chad
- MQQ, the Telegraph code for Miluo East railway station, Yueyang, Hunan, China
- mqq, the ISO 639-3 code for Minokok language, Malaysia
