= Chibi North railway station =

Railway station in Xianning, Hubei, China

Chibi North 赤壁北
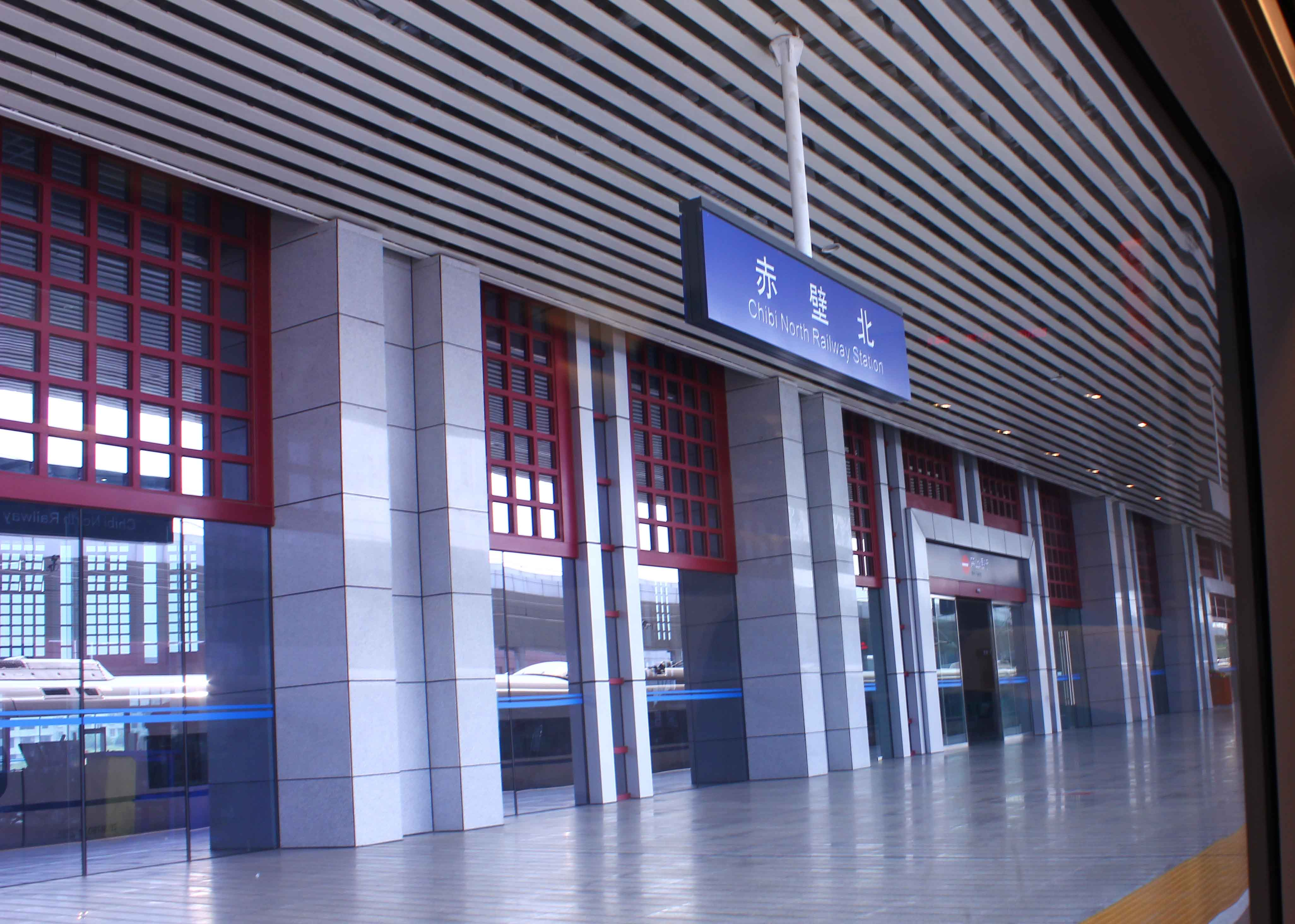
- The platform at Chibi North railway station.

General information
- Other names: Chibibei
- Location: Chibi, Xianning, Hubei; China
- Coordinates: 29°44′25.63″N 113°53′40.66″E
- Operator: China Railway Wuhan Group
- Line: Wuhan–Guangzhou High-Speed Railway

Other information
- Station code: TMIS code: 65809; Telegraph code: CIN; Pinyin code: CBB

History
- Opened: 2009
Location

Chibi North railway station (Chinese: 赤壁北站; pinyin: Chìbì běi zhàn) is a railway station serving Chibi, Xianning, Hubei Province, China. It is on the Wuhan–Guangzhou high-speed railway, a segment of the Beijing–Guangzhou high-speed railway. The station opened in 2009.

| Preceding station | China Railway High-speed | Following station |
|---|---|---|
| Xianning North towards Wuhan | Wuhan–Guangzhou high-speed railway | Yueyang East towards Guangzhou South |
