= Shaoguan railway station =

Railway station in Guangdong, China

Shaoguan 韶关
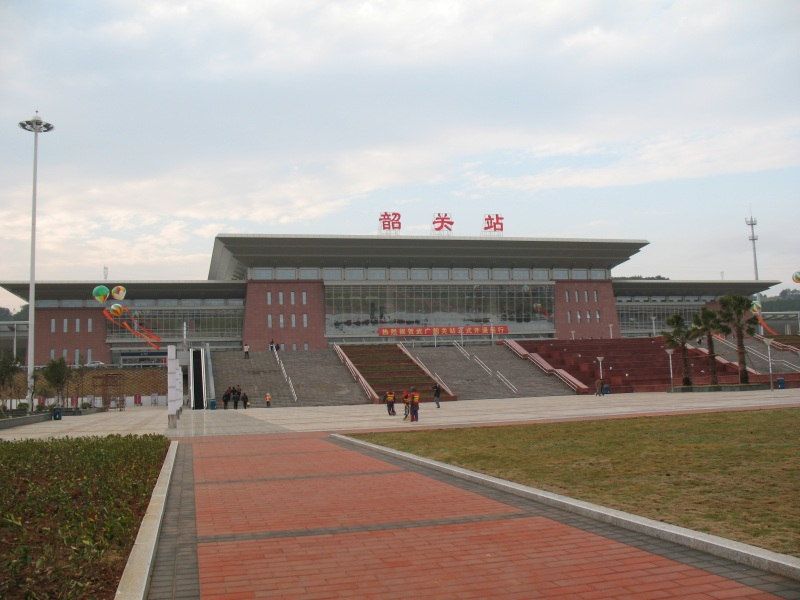

General information
- Location: Xilian, Wujiang District, Shaoguan, Guangdong; China
- Coordinates: 24.7535°N 113.509°E
- Operated by: China Railway Guangzhou Group
- Line(s): Wuhan–Guangzhou High-Speed Railway

Other information
- Station code: TMIS code: 65839; Telegraph code: SNQ; Pinyin code: SGU
- Classification: 1st class station

History
- Opened: 2009

Shaoguan railway station (simplified Chinese: 韶关站; traditional Chinese: 韶關站; pinyin: Sháoguān Zhàn) is a railway station located in Wujiang District, Shaoguan, Guangdong, China. The name originally referred to the station on the Jingguang Railway which has since been renamed to Shaoguan East railway station.

== Video ==
CRH3C trains entering and leaving Shaoguan railway station

Preceding station	China Railway High-speed	Following station
Lechang East towards Wuhan	Wuhan–Guangzhou high-speed railway	Yingde West towards Guangzhou South
