= Yingde West railway station =

Railway station in Guangdong, China

Yingde West 英德西
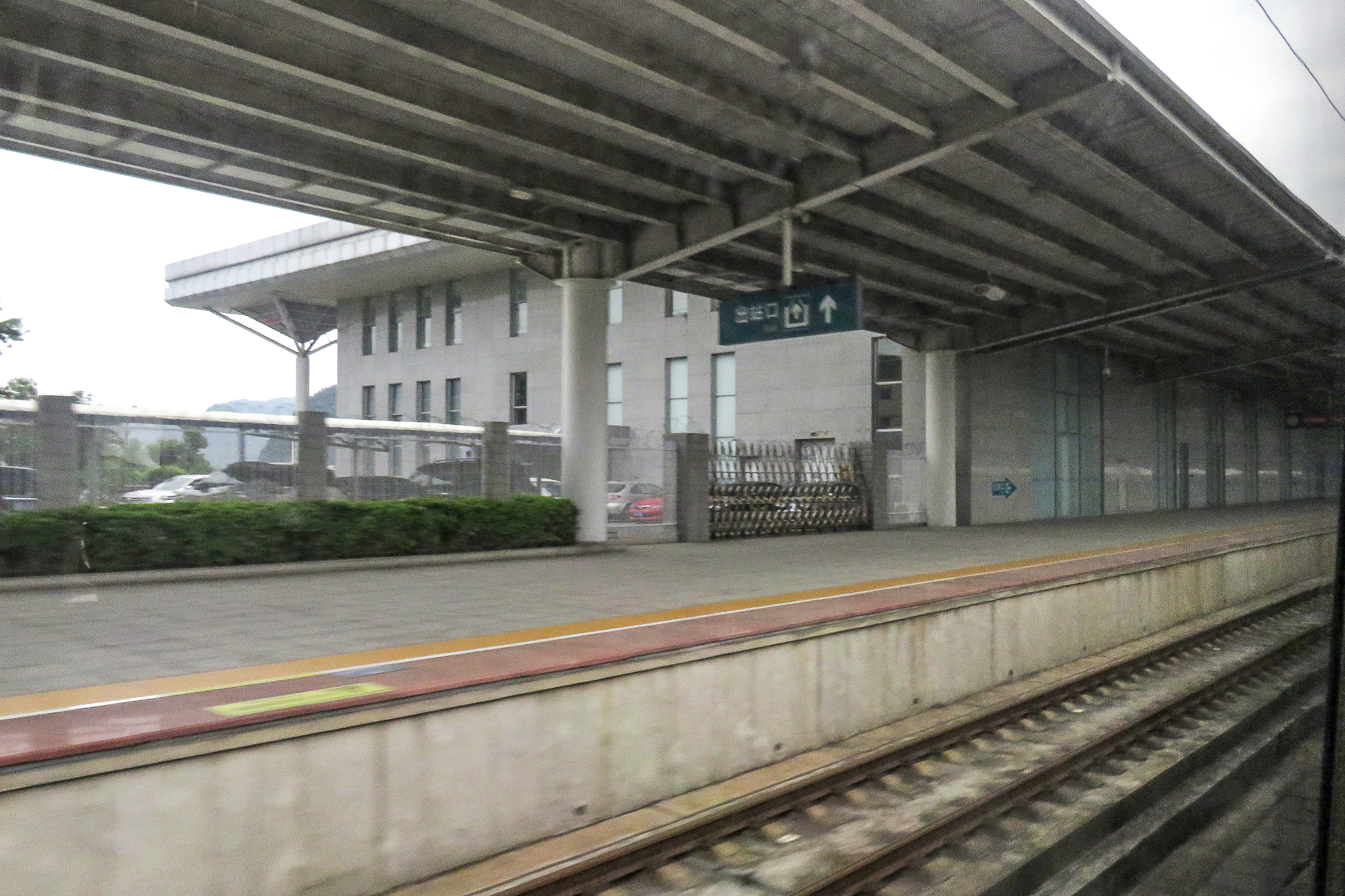
- Platform 1

General information
- Other names: Yingdexi
- Location: Yingcheng Subdistrict, Yingde City, Qingyuan Prefecture; Guangdong Province; China
- Coordinates: 24°9′45″N 113°20′41″E
- Elevation: 288 m (945 ft)
- System: Wuhan–Guangzhou High-Speed Railway
- Owner: China State Railway Group Co., Ltd.
- Operator: CR Guangzhou
- Manager: Guangshen Railway Co., Ltd.
- Line: Beijing–Guangzhou–Shenzhen–Hong Kong High-Speed Railway
- Platforms: 2 side platforms with 2 platform faces.
- Tracks: 4 in total (2 main tracks and 2 arrival-departure tracks)

Construction
- Structure type: At-grade

Other information
- Station code: 65842

History
- Opened: 1 April 2012

Services
Preceding station	China Railway High-speed	Following station
Shaoguan towards Wuhan	Wuhan–Guangzhou high-speed railway	Qingyuan towards Guangzhou South
Location

Yingde West railway station (YDX) is a high-speed railway station. It is located in the Yincheng Subdistrict of Yingde City, in the Qingyuan Prefecture of Guangdong Province in China. The station opened on 1 April 2012.

== History ==
During the initial planning stages of the Wuhan–Guangzhou Passenger Dedicated Line, a station in Yingde was originally included; however, to ensure high operating speeds across the entire line, several smaller stations were cancelled, while others—including this one—were downgraded to passing loops with provisions for future expansion. The Ministry of Railways eventually approved the establishment of a passenger station in Yingde in 2009. Shortly before the line's inauguration, the station was officially named Yingde West Station.

Construction on the expansion of Yingde West Station began in 2010, making it the first station in China to be built on a high-speed railway line that was already in operation. The station officially opened for service on April 1, 2012.

== Structure ==
Yingde West Station is situated on a 14,255 m² lot, with the station building accounting for 6,746 m² and standing 18.2 meters tall; it features one primary platform and one intermediate platform.

== Operational status ==
As of the nationwide railway schedule adjustment for the third quarter of 2026 (effective July 1, 2026), Yingde West Station handled a total of 35 scheduled trains.
