= Chenzhou West railway station =

Railway station in Chenzhou, Hunan, China

Chenzhou West 郴州西
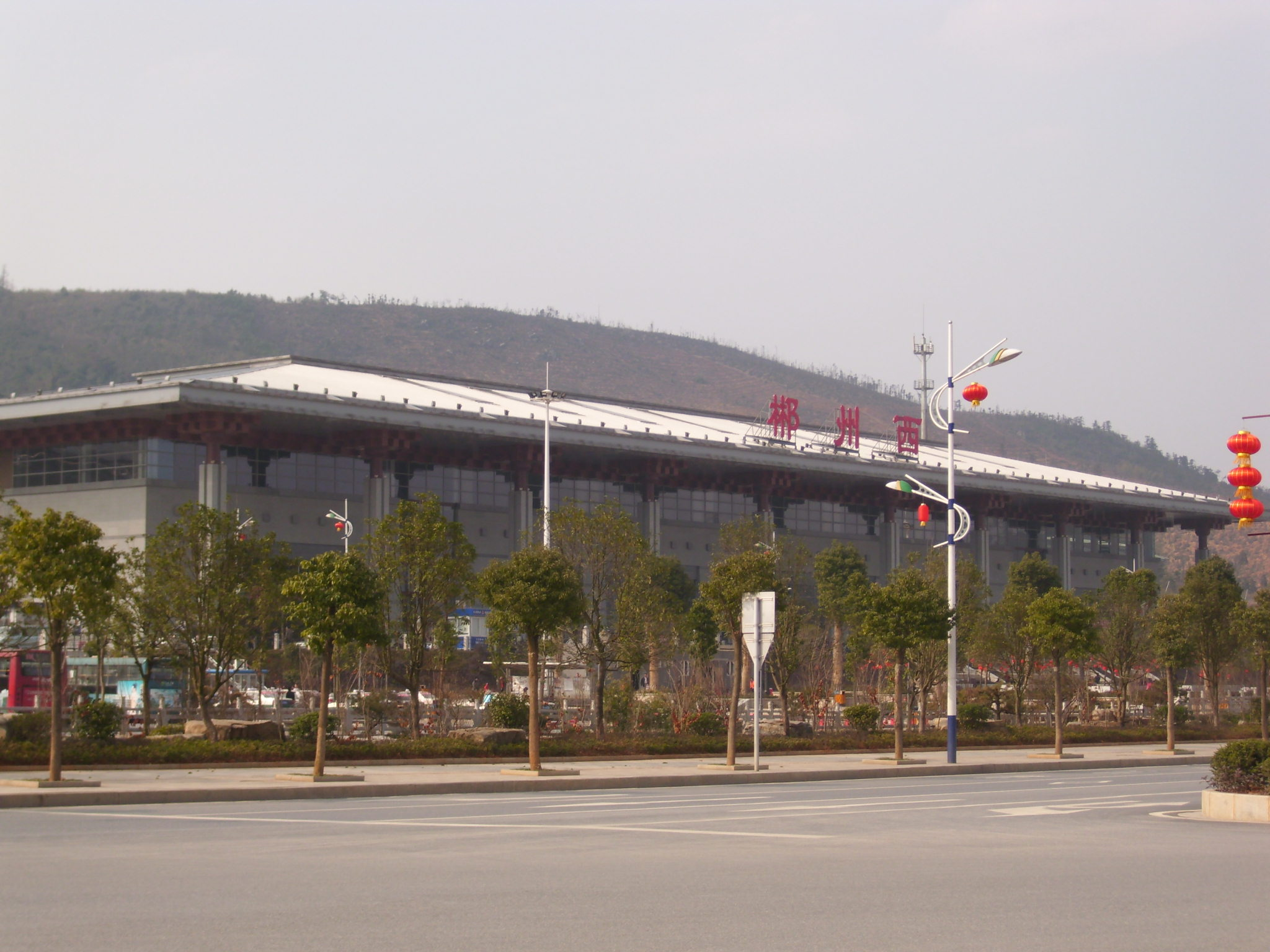
- Chenzhou West railway station

General information
- Other names: Chenzhouxi
- Location: Wanhuayan, Beihu District, Chenzhou, Hunan; China
- Operated by: Guangzhou Railway Group Co. Ltd.
- Line: Wuhan–Guangzhou High-Speed Railway

Other information
- Station code: TMIS code: 65833; Telegraph code: ICQ; Pinyin code: CZX
- Classification: 4th class station

History
- Opened: 2009
Location

Chenzhou West Station, also known as New Chenzhou Station, is located in Wanhua Rock Town, Beihu District, Chenzhou City, Hunan Province, China, near Zenghu Village and Tangwei Village. It is a station on the Beijing-Guangzhou High-Speed Railway and was opened on December 26, 2009.

== Station information ==
In July 2023, the layout of the station was adjusted to improve passenger flow. After exiting the station, passengers can no longer leave through the original P1 parking lot across the exit, as it has been converted into a coach station which provides coach service to locations such as Zixing, Yizhang, Yongxing, Rucheng, Anren, Linwu, Guiyang, Guidong, and Jiahe.

On April 6 2025, Chenzhou West Station set a new record for passenger volume, with nearly 35,000 travelers dispatched that day.
