= Yueyang East railway station =

Railway station in Yueyang, Hunan, China

Yueyang East 岳阳东
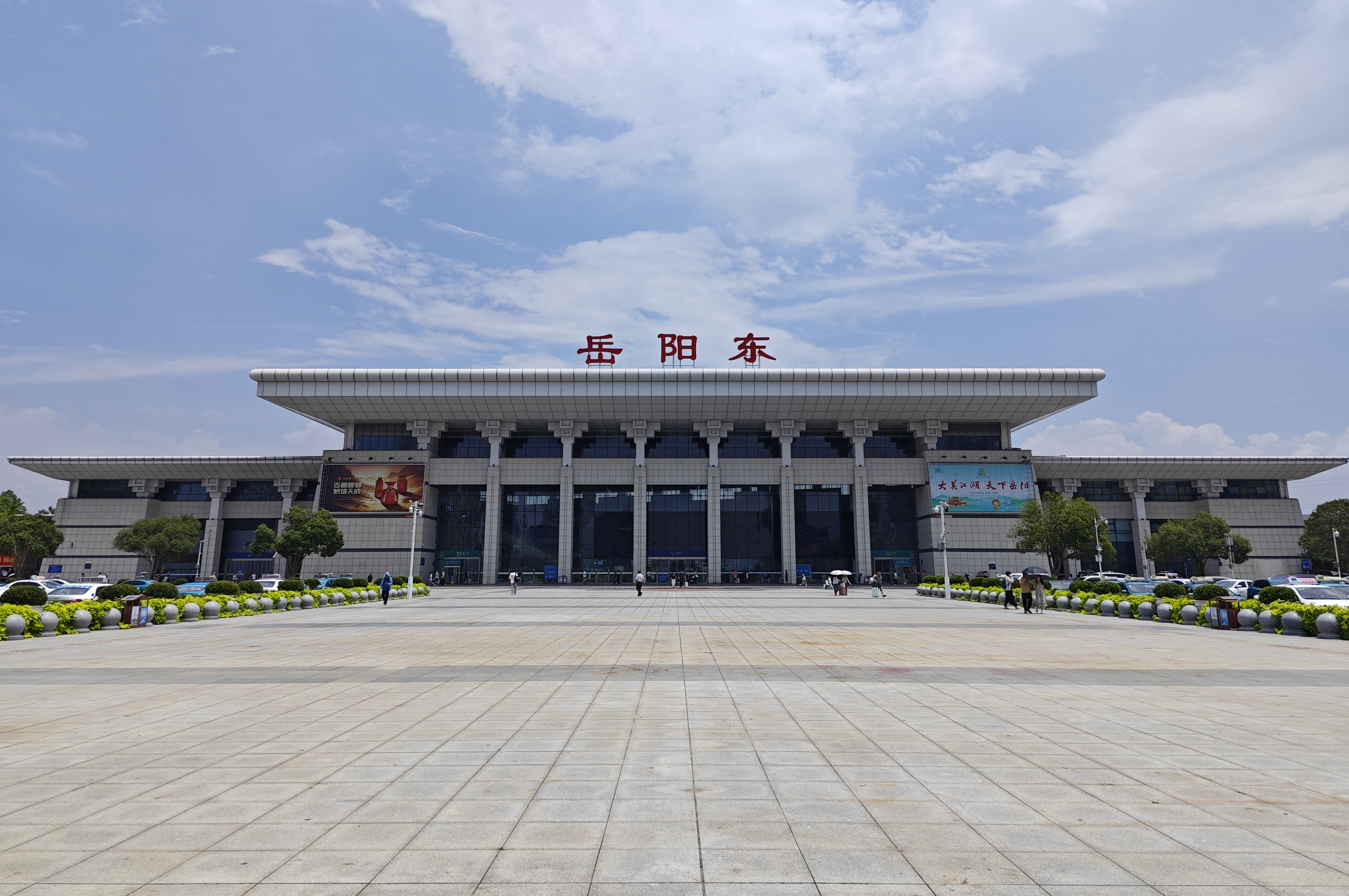
- station building (July 2025)

General information
- Other names: Yueyangdong
- Location: Yueyanglou District, Yueyang, Hubei; China
- Coordinates: 29°22′5.28″N 113°10′48.52″E
- Operated by: China Railway Guangzhou Group
- Line: Wuhan–Guangzhou High-Speed Railway

Other information
- Station code: TMIS code: 65812; Telegraph code: YIQ; Pinyin code: YYD
- Classification: 1st class station

History
- Opened: 2009
Location

Yueyang East railway station (Chinese: 岳阳东站) is a railway station located in Yueyanglou District, Yueyang, Hunan Province, China. It is on the Wuhan–Guangzhou high-speed railway, a segment of the Beijing–Guangzhou high-speed railway. The station opened in 2009. It is also the last station in Hunan before the train crosses the border to Hubei Province at Chibi North railway station.

== External resources ==
- A February 2011 photo of this station

Preceding station	China Railway High-speed	Following station
Chibi North towards Wuhan	Wuhan–Guangzhou high-speed railway	Miluo East towards Guangzhou South
