= Miluo East railway station =

Railway station in Yueyang, Hunan, China

Miluo East 汨罗东
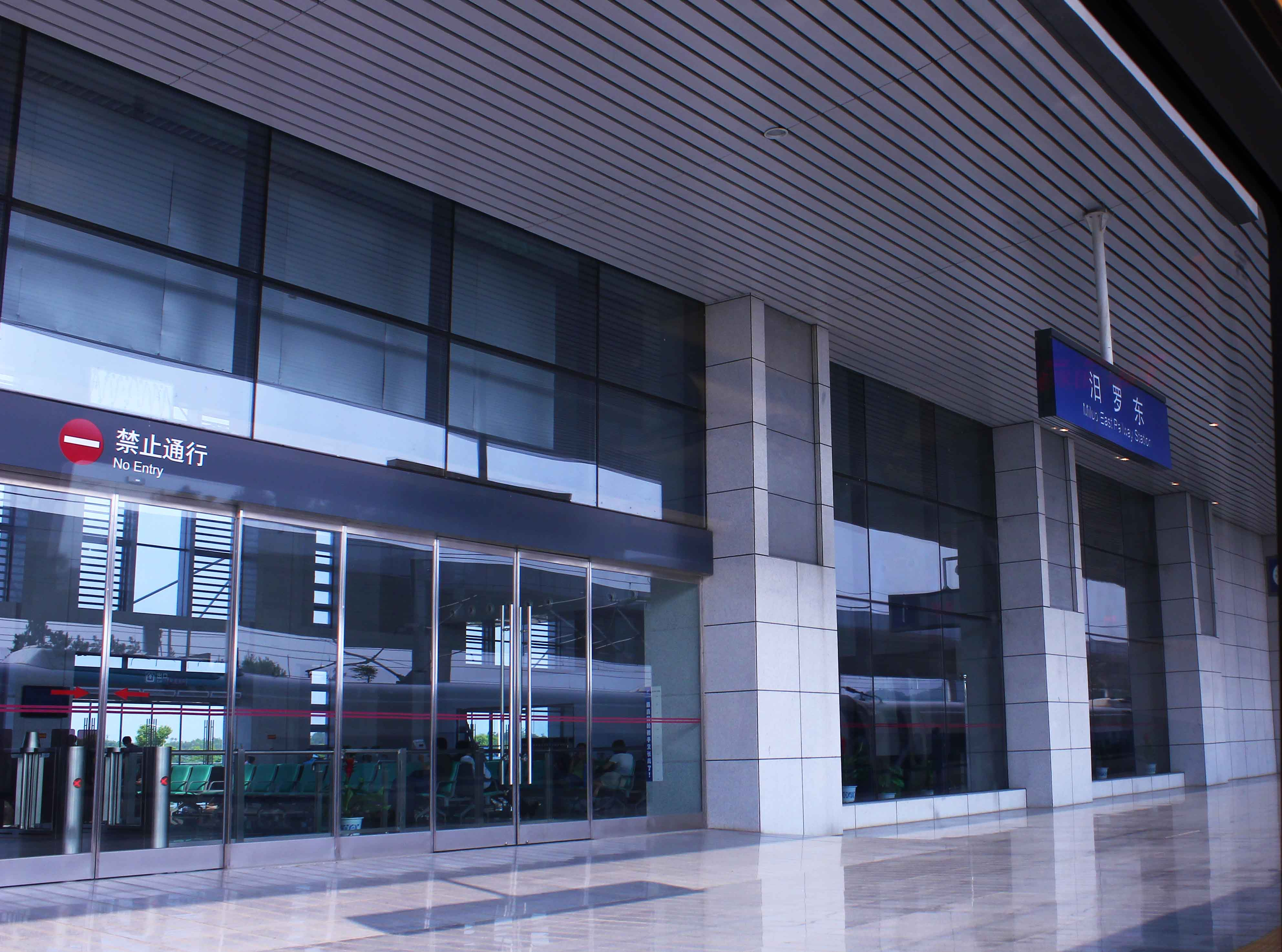
- The platform at Miluo East Railway Station, China

General information
- Other names: Miluodong
- Location: Miluo, Yueyang, Hunan; China
- Coordinates: 28.748538°N 113.138005°E
- Operated by: China Railway Guangzhou Group
- Line: Wuhan–Guangzhou High-Speed Railway

Other information
- Station code: TMIS code: 65815; Telegraph code: MQQ; Pinyin code: MLD

History
- Opened: 2009
Location

Miluo East railway station is a railway station located in Miluo, Yueyang, Hunan Province, China. It is on the Wuhan–Guangzhou high-speed railway, a segment of the Beijing–Guangzhou high-speed railway. The station opened in 2009, with plans to serve 5000 passengers a day.

The station is about 10 km southeast of Miluo City and near National Highway 107. The station building has a floor area of 6201.6 m^{2} and is decorated with dragon boat motifs.

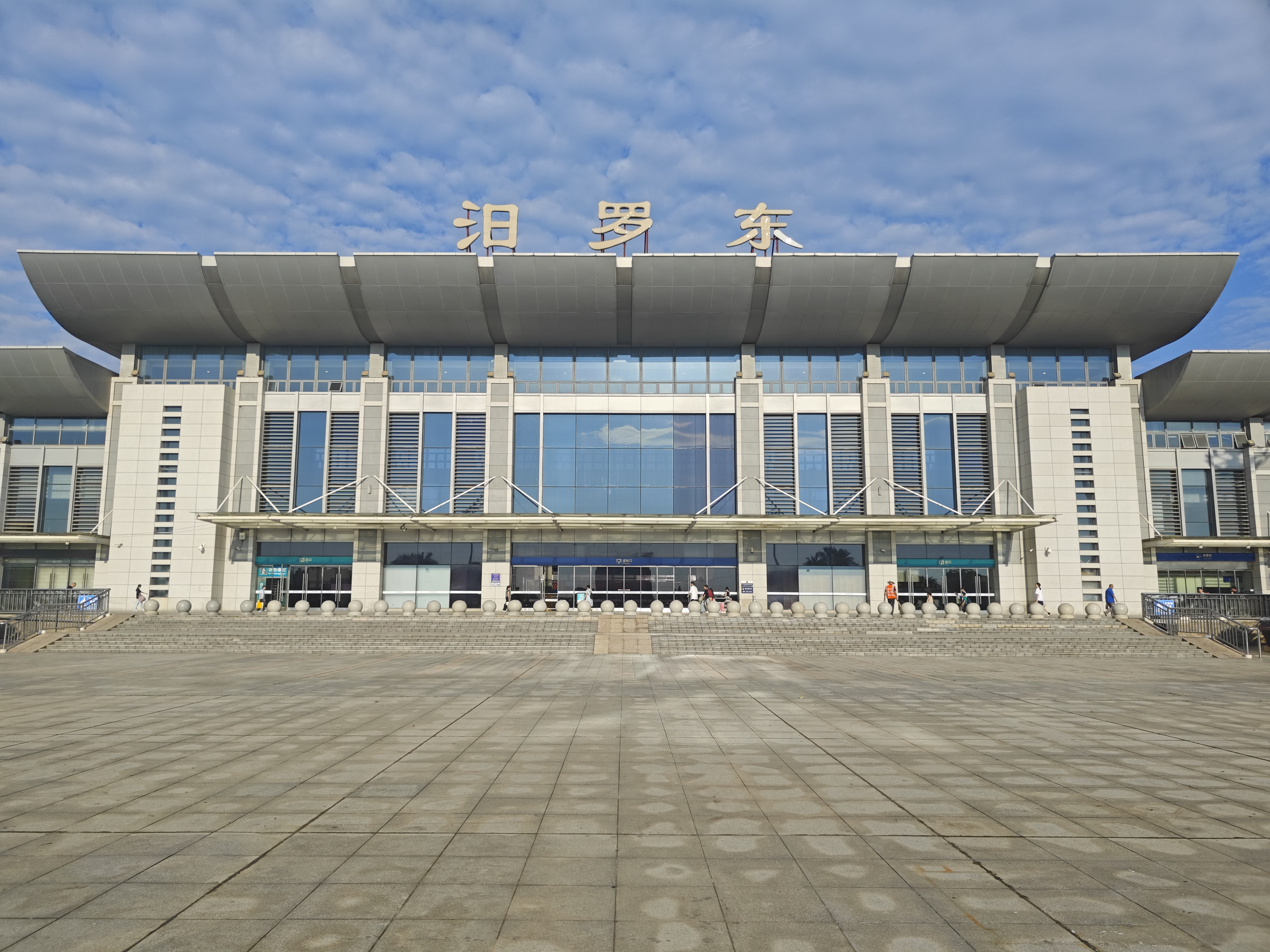
Station building exterior

Preceding station	China Railway High-speed	Following station
Yueyang East towards Wuhan	Wuhan–Guangzhou high-speed railway	Changsha South towards Guangzhou South
