= China Railway CRH380A =

Chinese high-speed train

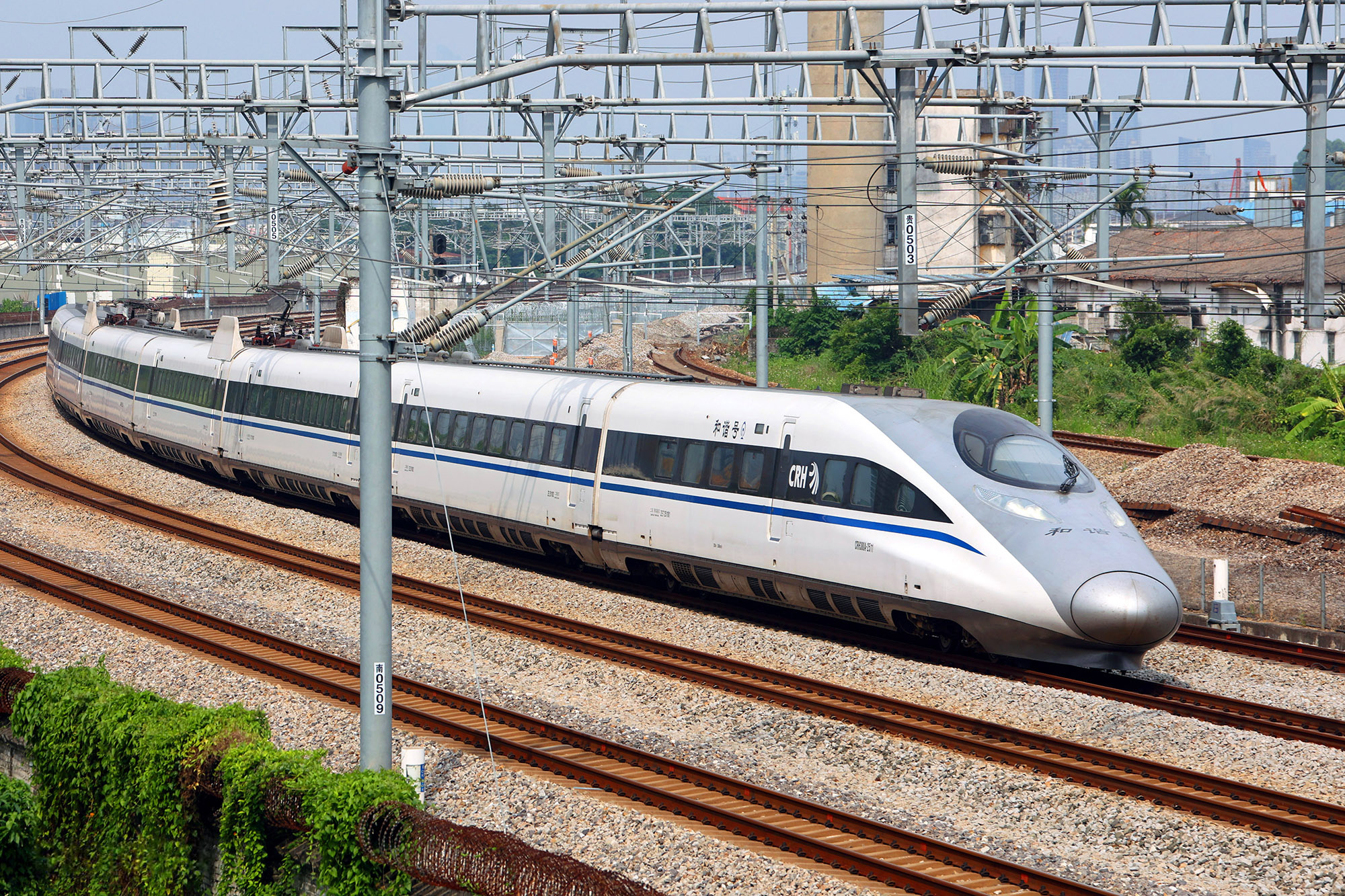
- CRH380A-2511
- In service: CRH380A: 30 October 2010; CRH380A (EC): 16 January 2014; CRH380AL: 30 May 2011; CRH380AN: 22 January 2019
- Manufacturer: CSR Qingdao Sifang
- Number built: CRH380A: 40 trainsets (320 cars); CRH380A (EC Type): 279+9 trainsets (2304 cars); CRH380AL: 113 trainsets (1808 cars); CRH380AM: 1 trainset (6 cars); CRH380AN: 1 trainset (8 cars)
- Successor: CR400AF, CR400BF
- Formation: CRH380A/CRH380A (EC Type): 8 cars/trainset (6M2T); CRH380AL: 16 cars/trainset (14M2T); CRH380AM: 6 cars/trainset (6M0T); CRH380AN: 8 cars/trainset (4M4T)
- Capacity: CRH380A: 480; CRH380A (EC Type): 556; CRH380AL: 1061 or 1028
- Operators: China Railway; CR Beijing; CR Chengdu; CR Guangzhou; CR Kunming; CR Nanchang; CR Nanning; CR Taiyuan; CR Wuhan; CR Xi'an; CR Zhengzhou; MTR Corporation

Specifications
- Train length: CRH380A / CRH380A (EC Type): 203 m (666 ft 0 in); CRH380AL: 401.4 m (1,316 ft 11 in)
- Width: 3,380 mm (11 ft 1 1/8 in)
- Height: 3,700 mm (12 ft 1 5/8 in)
- Platform height: 1,250 mm (4 ft 1 1/4 in)
- Maximum speed: 350 km/h (217 mph) (operation); 486.1 km/h (302 mph) (testing); 310 km/h (193 mph) (ATP)
- Traction system: Water cooling IGBT-VVVF inverter control (Zhuzhou CSR Times Electric TGA10A/10B/10E/10H or Hitachi CII-HHR1420C)
- Traction motors: External sector 3-phase AC induction motor (Zhuzhou CSR Times Electric or Hitachi)
- Power output: CRH380A / CRH380A (EC Type): 9.6 MW (12,874 hp); CRH380AL: 20.44 MW (27,410 hp)
- Electric system: 25 kV 50 Hz AC Overhead catenary
- Current collection: Pantograph
- Braking systems: Regenerative, electronically controlled pneumatic brakes
- Track gauge: 1,435 mm (4 ft 8 1/2 in) standard gauge

The CRH380A Hexie (simplified Chinese: 和谐号; traditional Chinese: 和諧號; pinyin: Héxié Hào; lit. 'Harmony') is a Chinese electric high-speed train that was developed by CSR Corporation Limited (CSR) and is currently manufactured by CRRC Qingdao Sifang. As a continuation of the CRH2-380 program it both replaces foreign (Japanese) technology in the CRH2 with Chinese developments and increases its top speed. The CRH380A is designed to operate at a cruise speed of 350 km/h (217 mph) and a maximum speed of 380 km/h (236 mph) in commercial service. The original 8-car train-set recorded a top speed of 416.6 km/h (258.9 mph) during a trial run. The longer 16-car train-set reached 486.1 km/h (302.0 mph).

CRH380A is one of four Chinese train series which has been designed for the new standard operating speed of 380 km/h (236 mph) on newly constructed Chinese high-speed main lines. Officially, it is the only one among the four series that was not based on a foreign design, and although it was not produced under a technology transfer agreement, there have been accusations that it is based on unlicensed Shinkansen technology.

The other three series are CRH380B, which uses technology from Siemens, CRH380C, with technology from Hitachi, and CRH380D, with technology from Bombardier Transportation.

== Development ==
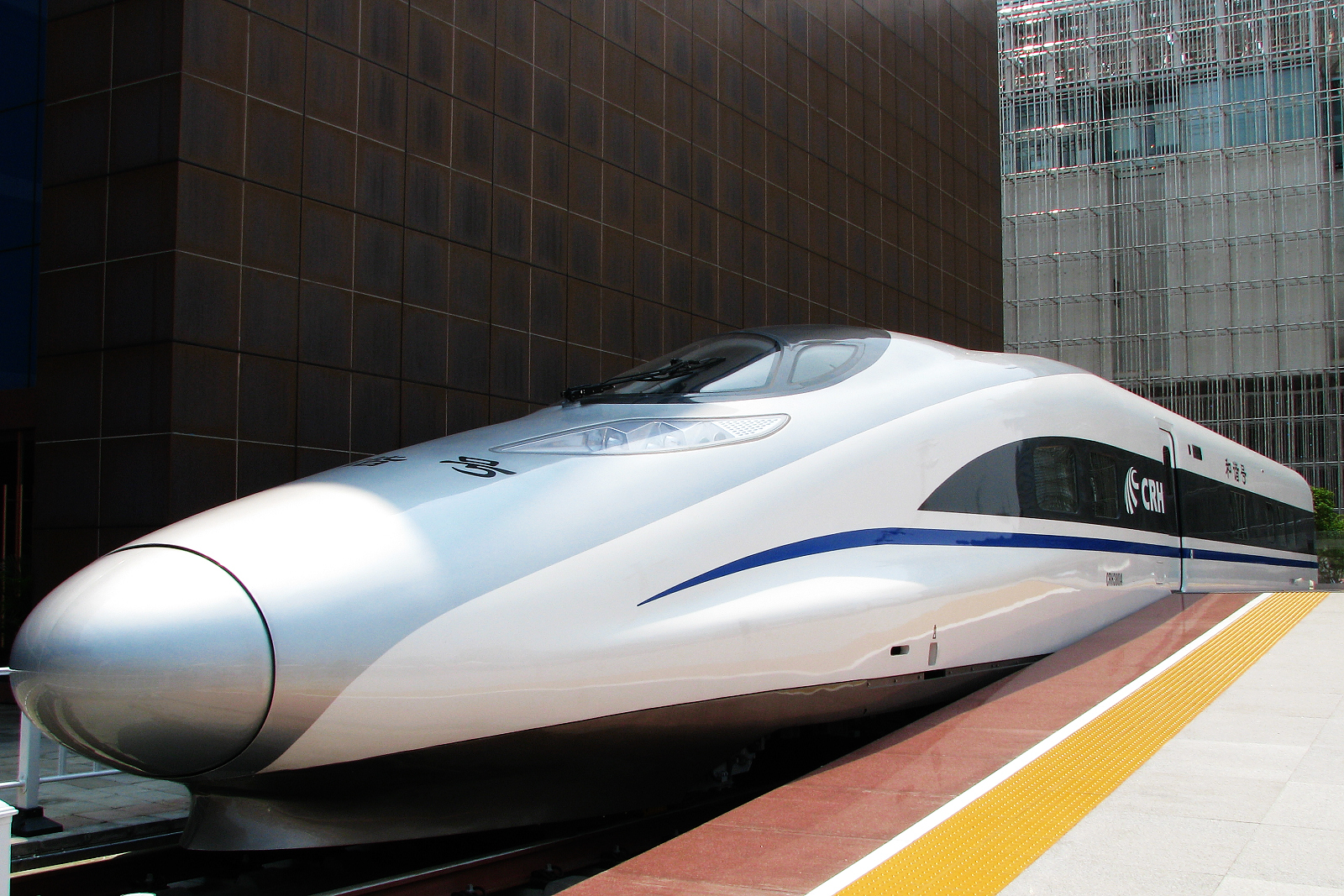
CRH380A at the Shanghai World Expo 2010

Development began in early 2008 during the research of the CRH2-300, which was later known as the CRH2C. CSR Corporation conducted over 1,000 technical tests across 17 specific areas, including dynamic performance, pantograph-catenary current collection, aerodynamics, and traction performance. These studies enabled CSR to develop technology that allowed for an increased maximum speed, and the findings were incorporated into the designs for the new-generation high-speed train.

The original project was named "CRH2-350". On February 26, 2008, the Chinese Ministry of Science and Ministry of Railway (MOR) signed the Agreement on Joint and Independent Innovations of China High-speed Trains. CRH2-350 is one of the most important projects of this plan, the purpose of which is the development of Chinese-designed new-generation high speed trains with continuous operating speeds of 350 km/h (217 mph), and maximum operating speeds of 380 km/h (236 mph). The next generation of rolling stock is expected to be used on the Beijing–Shanghai high-speed railway. The project officially launched in 2009, and was included in the "Eleventh Five-Year Plan"'s technology support program for developing technology and equipment for China' s high speed trains.

Designs were driven by analysis of data and operational experience from the Beijing–Tianjin high-speed rail. The Ministry of Railway completed an initial series of system and subsystem designs, then provided CSR Sifang with primary data and design. CSR presented more than 20 design variations. After further optimization, simulation and testing, the final design was published in an official conference held by Sifang on April 12, 2010 with significant changes to traction system, internal amenities and exterior carbody design. A train model was exhibited in May at the China Railway Pavilion in the Shanghai World Expo Park.

In September 2009, Ministry of Railways awarded a contract for one hundred 16-car and forty 8-car new-generation high-speed trains from CSR Sifang Locomotive & Rolling Stock in a contract worth ¥45 billion (US$6.64 billion).

=== Technical features ===
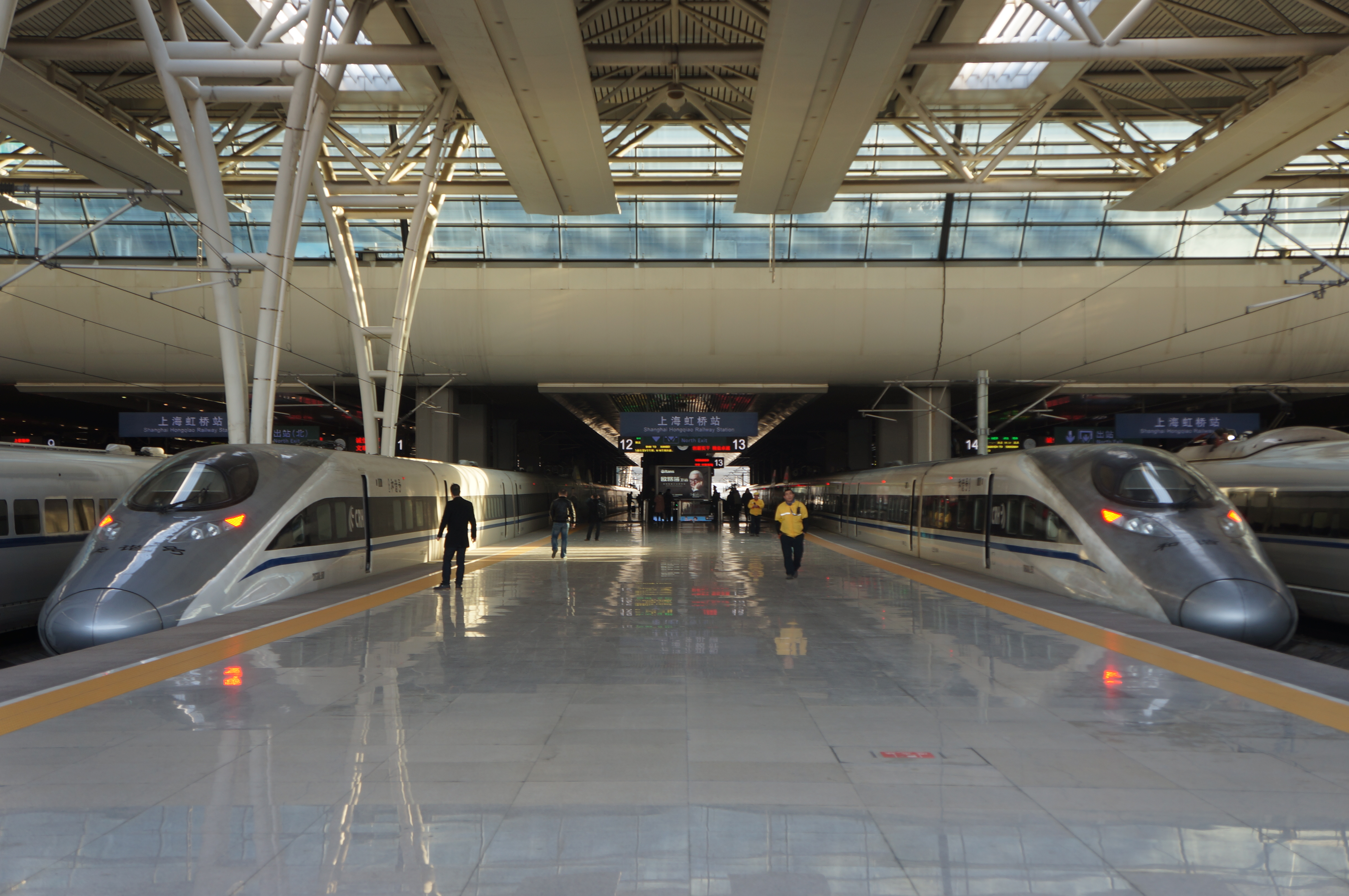
Two CRH380ALs at Shanghai Hongqiao railway station.

According to CSR, the overall design of CRH380A reflects ten major goals.

- Low-resistance, streamlined head akin to those on the 500 Series Shinkansen. The nose of the train has a resistance coefficient of less than 0.13, aerodynamic resistance was reduced by 6.1%, aerodynamic noise by 7%, aerodynamic lift by 51.7% and the lateral force acting on the head by 6.1%.
- Vibration mode system matching. The CRH380A uses a lightweight aluminum alloy body whose total weight is no more than 9 t (8.9 long tons; 9.9 short tons), less than 17% of the entire vehicle; CSR has comprehensively improved the body structure, adopting a large number of new vibration damping materials. It also designed the bogie to match the performance of the body and optimized the train body's natural frequencies, which helps reduce structural vibrations at high speeds and improves ride comfort.
- Improved airtightness: The pressure changes inside the train are controlled to 200 Pa (0.029 psi)/s, with the maximum pressure change inside the train remaining below 800 Pa (0.12 psi) compared with the standard value of 1,000 Pa (0.15 psi). This improves passenger comfort when the train is entering and exiting tunnels at high speed.
- Safe and reliable high-speed bogies. The train is equipped with SWMB-400/SWTB-400 bolster-less bogies. These are a redesign of the SWMB-350/SWTB-350 bogies used by CRH2C; their critical instability speed is 550 km/h (342 mph). The new train's derail coefficient is 0.34 at a speed of 386 km/h (240 mph) while the maximum derail coefficient of the CRH2A is 0.73.
- Advanced noise control technology. By reducing sources of noise and adopting new sound absorbing and insulating materials, CSR has been able to control noise inside the train. The noise level is at 67 dB - 69 dB when running at 350 km/h (217 mph), which is similar to the CRH2A running at 250 km/h (155 mph).
- High-performance traction system, with YQ-365 motors manufactured by CSR Zhuzhou Electric Co., Ltd and CI11 Traction converters by Zhuzhou CSR Times Electric. The CRH380A has a new power unit configuration to maximize traction power. This allows the train to accelerate to 380 km/h (236 mph) in 7 minutes.
- Regenerative braking with a maximum energy feedback rate of 95%. With each stop nearly 800 kWh of electric power can be fed back to the electric grid.

== Variants ==
=== CRH380A/AL ===
The first prototype eight-car train CRH380A was rolled off the production line in April 2010, and tested at the China Academy of Railway Sciences experimental loop line (Beijing loop line) starting from April 26, 2010. Trial runs on the Zhengzhou–Xi'an high-speed railway started on June 7, 2010.

The initial standard CRH380A trainsets was delivered in August 2010, The first test on conventional rail, based on a daily-service mode, was conducted on September 28, 2010.

The test was held on the Shanghai–Hangzhou Passenger Railway. The trainset with series number CRH_{380A}-6001 reached the maximum speed of 416.6 km/h (258.9 mph).

CRH380A entered service on September 30, 2010 in limited capacity to handle National Day traffic demand on the Shanghai–Nanjing high-speed railway line.

On October 26, 2010, CRH380A entered regular service at the Shanghai–Hangzhou passenger railway and Shanghai–Nanjing intercity railway. The maximum speed of the Shanghai–Hangzhou line was nominally set at 350 km/h (217 mph), with automatic speed controls kicking in when a train exceeds 355 km/h (221 mph). The travel time between Shanghai and Hangzhou reduced from 1 hour 18 minutes to 45 minutes. and travel time between Nanjing and Hangzhou reduced to 2 hours 48 minutes.

CRH380A started daily service at the Wuhan–Guangzhou high-speed railway as of December 3, 2010.

The CRH380AL is the 16 car version of the CRH380A. The first set of CRH380AL, series number CRH_{380A}-6041L, rolled off line by October 2010. On November 8, 2010, the 16-car train was sent to Beijing loop line for test. On November 20, 2010, the train was sent to Beijing–Shanghai high-speed railway for trial run. On November 26, 2010, the first 380 km/h (236 mph) test run at the Beijing–Shanghai high-speed railway was launched at Zaozhuang - Bengbu section. The trainset with series number CRH_{380A}-6041L reached the maximum speed of 486.1 km/h (302.0 mph) on December 3, 2010. During the test, It traveled 220 km (137 mi) in 34 minutes, an average speed of approximately 388 km/h (241 mph).

=== MTR CRH380A ===
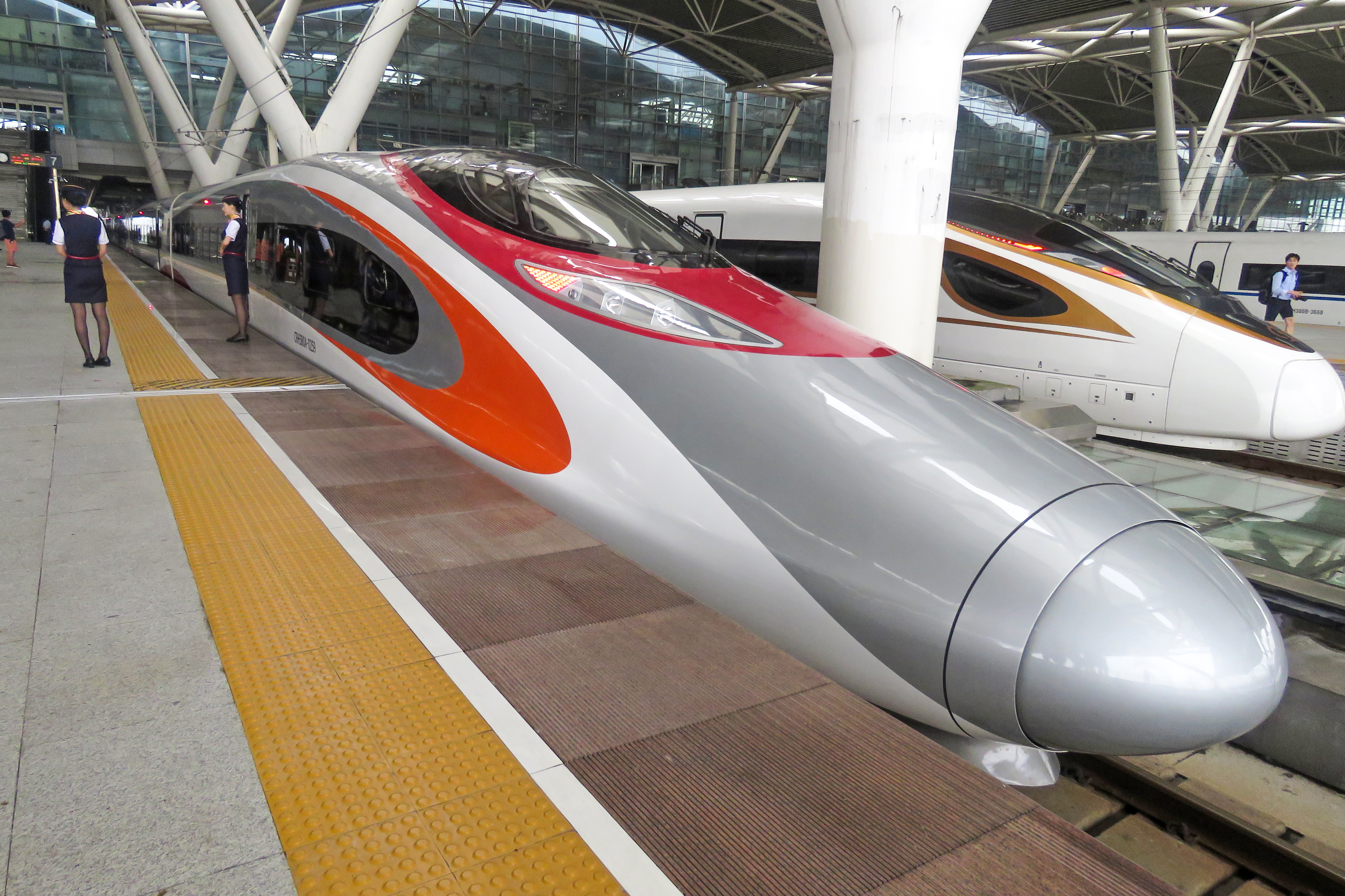
A CRH380A as Vibrant Express serving the Guangzhou–Shenzhen–Hong Kong Express Rail Link

On April 18, 2012, the MTR ordered nine CRH380A train sets for Guangzhou–Shenzhen–Hong Kong Express Rail Link, designated as Vibrant Express.

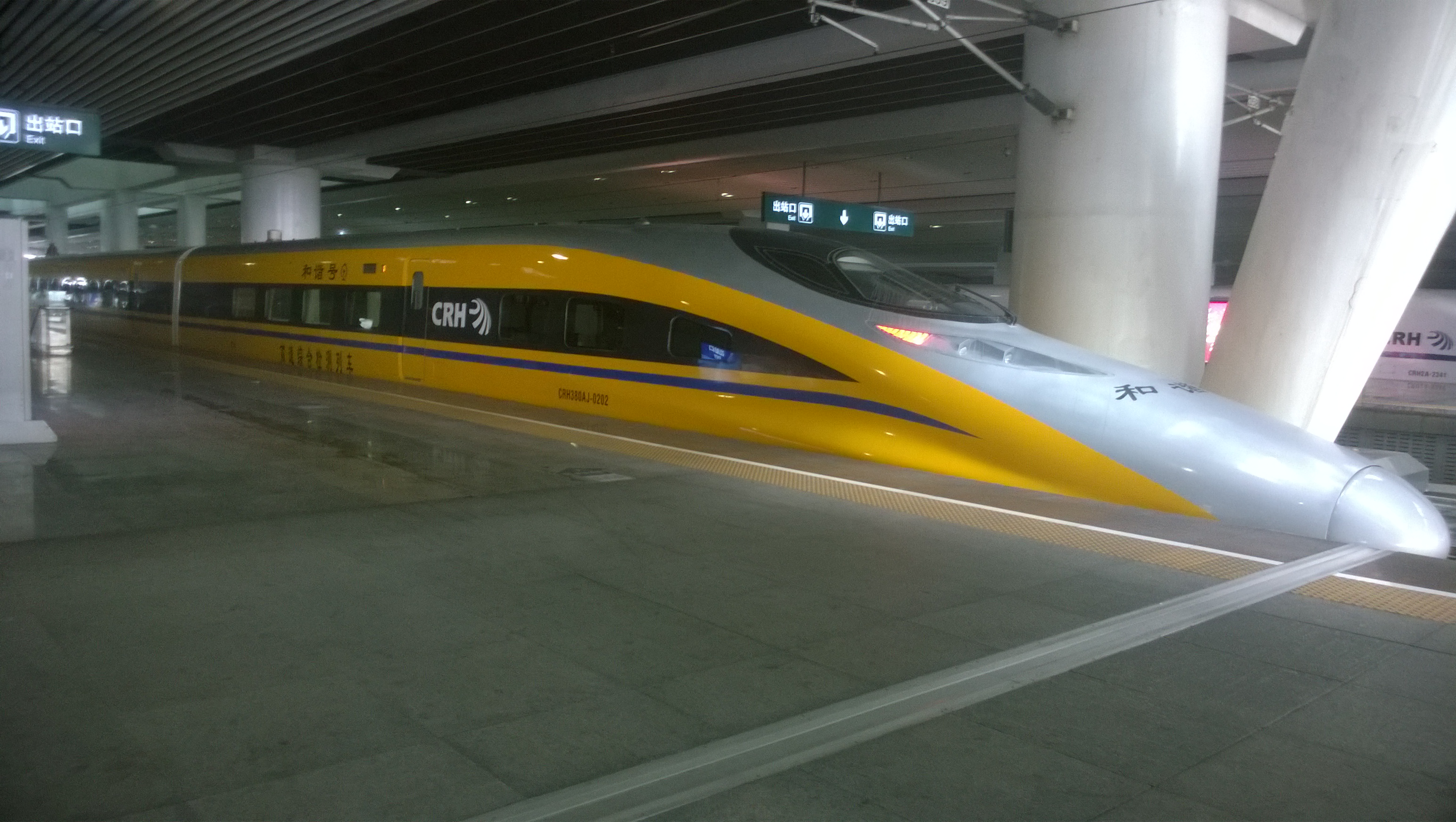
CRH380AJ at Guangzhou South railway station

== Train series number ==
- CRH380A: CRH380A–2501 - CRH380A–2540, CRH380A–2641 - CRH380A–2912, CRH380A–2921 - CRH380A–2925
- CRH380AL: CRH380AL–2541 - CRH380AL–2640, CRH380AL–2913 - CRH380AL–2920, CRH380AL–2926 - CRH380AL–2930

== Formation ==
Power Designation

- M – Motor car
- T – Trailer car
- C – Driver cabin
- P – Pantograph

Coach Type

- SW – Business Class Coach
- ZY – First Class Coach
- ZE – Second Class Coach
- ZEC – Second Class Coach/Buffet Car
- ZYT – First Class/Premier Coach
- ZET – Second Class/Premier Coach
- ZYS – First Class/Business Coach
- ZES – Second Class/Business Coach

=== CRH380A ===
Coach No.	1	2	3	4	5	6	7	8
Type^{1}	ZET	ZE	ZYT	ZY	ZEC	ZE		ZET
Type^{2}	ZYS	ZE	SW	ZE	ZEC	ZE		ZES
Type^{3}	ZYS	ZE			ZEC	ZE		ZES
Power Configuration	TC	M		MP	M	MP	M	TC
Power Units	Unit 1				Unit 2			
Capacity^{1}	40+6	85	38+6	51	38+14	85		40+6
Capacity^{2}	28+5	85	21	75	63	85		40+5
Capacity^{3}	28+5	85	85	75	63	85		40+5

- ^1 Train series No. 2501-2540
- ^2 Train series No. 2796 (special train for Boao Forum for Asia)
- ^3 Remaining train series

=== CRH380AL ===
Coach No.	1	2	3	4	5	6	7	8	9	10	11	12	13	14	15	16
Type^{1}	ZYS	ZY	SW	ZY	ZE				ZEC	ZE						ZYS
Type^{2}	SW	ZY		ZE					ZEC	ZE						SW
Power Configuration	TC	M			MP	M							MP	M		TC
Power Units	Unit 1			Unit 2		Unit 3		Unit 4		Unit 5		Unit 6		Unit 7		
Capacity^{1}	25+2	56	24	56	73	85			38	85						25+2
Capacity^{2}	10+3	56	56	85	73	85			38	85						10+3

- ^1 Train series No. 2541～2570
- ^2 Remaining train series

== Distribution ==
As of November 2017, there are 447 CRH380A series EMU in service, in which six are high-speed comprehensive inspection trains (with one being a higher-speed experimental train).

Operator	Quantity	Serial number	Depot	Notes
CRH380A
CR Taiyuan	39	2641-2642, 2648, 2654, 2663-2664, 2668-2669, 2674-2679, 2689-2690, 2721, 2798, 2800, 2814, 2841, 2845-2848, 2861, 2867, 2904, 2908, 2921-2925, 2931-2935	Taiyuan	
CR Guangzhou	1	2796	Guangzhou South	Special train for Boao Forum for Asia
CR Nanchang	63	2501-2502, 2504, 2509, 2513, 2520-2521, 2523-2527, 2529, 2535, 2539-2540, 2658-2659, 2683-2684, 2691-2693, 2697-2704, 2707-2708, 2710-2713, 2716-2717, 2726-2731, 2737, 2741-2745, 2750-2755, 2760-2761, 2849, 2855, 2857, 2865	Nanchang West	
CR Nanchang	30	2694, 2784, 2786-2788, 2790-2795, 2805-2807, 2819, 2824, 2833-2834, 2839-2840, 2843-2844, 2886-2887, 2890-2895	Fuzhou South	
CR Nanchang	15	2709, 2714, 2785, 2789, 2802-2804, 2815-2817, 2825, 2850, 2856, 2858, 2866	Xiamen North	
CR Wuhan	11	2643, 2646, 2652, 2655, 2723, 2747, 2859-2860, 2879, 2888, 2900	Xiangyang	
CR Zhengzhou	8	2673, 2809-2810, 2862-2864, 2876-2877	Zhengzhou South	
CR Nanning	40	2649-2650, 2653, 2656-2657, 2662, 2670-2671, 2685-2688, 2695-2696, 2706, 2715, 2718-2719, 2724-2725, 2732, 2734-2736, 2738-2740, 2766-2767, 2797, 2799, 2826-2827, 2832, 2851-2852, 2874, 2878, 2881, 2906	Nanning	
CR Chengdu	26	2645, 2660, 2665-2666, 2680-2681, 2720, 2733, 2748-2749, 2758, 2762-2764, 2769, 2771, 2773, 2777, 2779, 2782-2783, 2820, 2823, 2853-2854, 2883	Chengdu East	
CR Chengdu	12	2672, 2756, 2759, 2772, 2774, 2776, 2778, 2801, 2812, 2821, 2837-2838	Guiyang North	
CR Chengdu	4	2647, 2770, 2780, 2822	Chongqing North	
CR Chengdu	15	2667, 2757, 2765, 2768, 2775, 2781, 2811, 2813, 2829-2831, 2835-2836, 2842, 2907	Chongqing West	
CR Kunming	55	2503, 2505-2508, 2510-2512, 2514-2519, 2522, 2528, 2530-2534, 2536-2538, 2644, 2651, 2661, 2682, 2705, 2722, 2746, 2868-2873, 2875, 2880, 2882, 2884-2885, 2889, 2896-2899, 2901-2903, 2905, 2909-2912	Kunming South	
CRH380A (Vibrant Express)
MTR Corporation	9	0251-0259	Shek Kong	Owned by KCR and leased to MTR for operation and maintenance. Mainly used on Guangzhou–Shenzhen–Hong Kong Express Rail Link.
CRH380AL
CR Beijing	15	2541, 2547, 2551-2552, 2554, 2556, 2561, 2564, 2568-2570	Shijiazhuang	2541 transferred to Nanchang in January 2024
CR Beijing	4	2543, 2558, 2562, 2567	Beijing	
CR Wuhan	26	2573, 2575-2581, 2583, 2586-2587, 2605, 2611, 2614, 2621-2624, 2627-2632, 2635-2636	Wuhan	
CR Wuhan	7	2582, 2584-2585, 2588, 2613, 2625, 2634	Xiangyang	
CR Xi'an	19	2571-2572, 2574, 2589-2593, 2596-2601, 2603, 2626, 2633, 2637-2638	Xi'an North	
CR Zhengzhou	7	2604, 2606-2610, 2617	Zhengzhou South	
CR Guangzhou	6	2594-2595, 2602, 2612, 2619, 2620	Guangzhou South	
CR Nanchang	11	2544-2546, 2548-2550, 2553, 2555, 2560, 2563, 2566	Xiamen North	
CR Nanchang	4	2542, 2557, 2559, 2565	Fuzhou South	
CR Chengdu	5	2915-2919	Chengdu East	
CRH380AN (formerly: CRH–0206)
CR Chengdu	1	0206	Chengdu East	Permanent magnet motor test vehicle
CRH380AJ (formerly: CIT400A)
China Railway	5	0201-0203, 2808, 2818	—N/a	Comprehensive inspection trains in orange livery
CRH380AM (formerly: CIT500)
China Railway	1	0204	—N/a	Experimental trainset

== Gallery ==
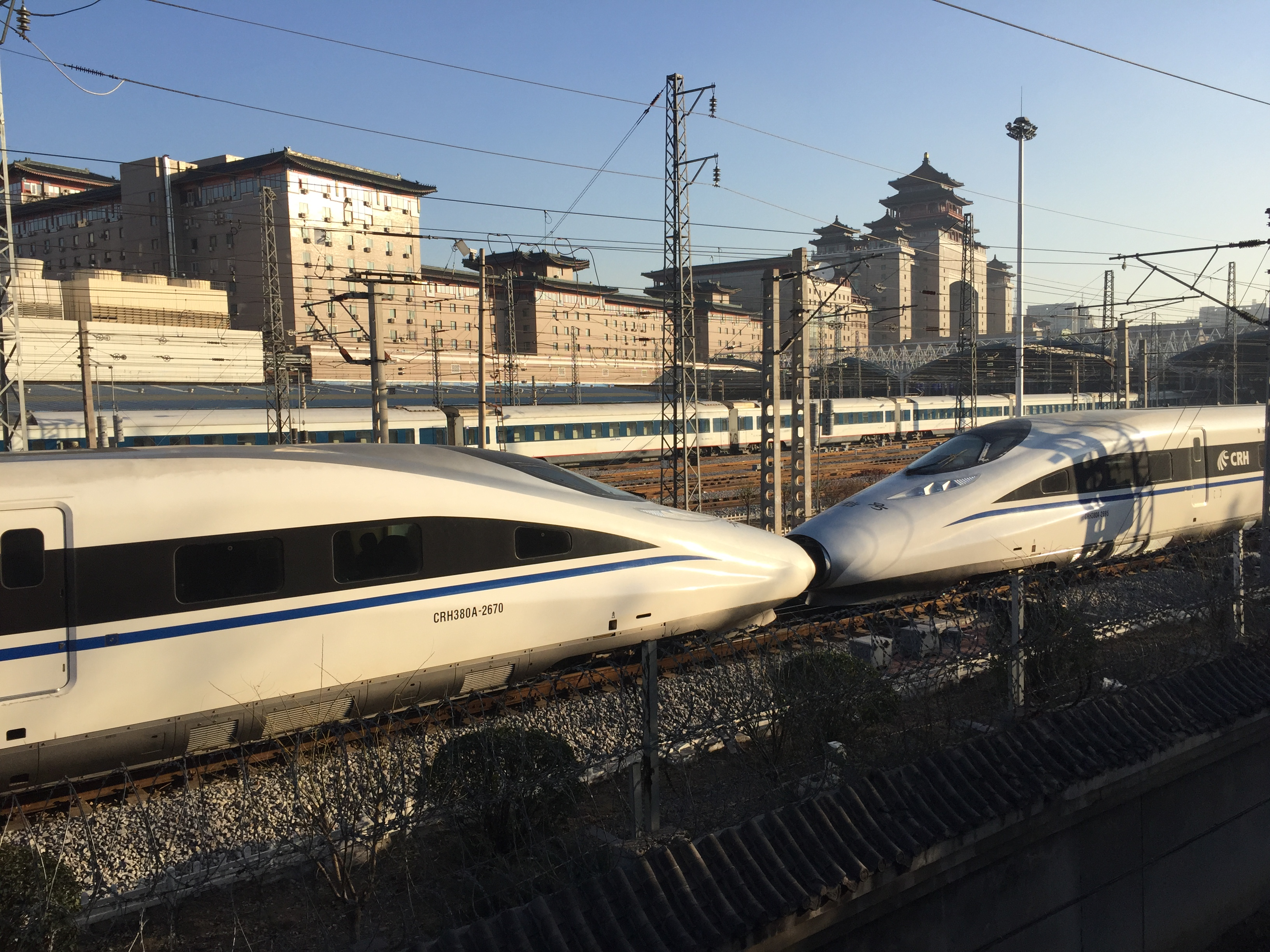
Consolidated models of CRH380A are often double-headed in operation (seen at Beijing West railway station)

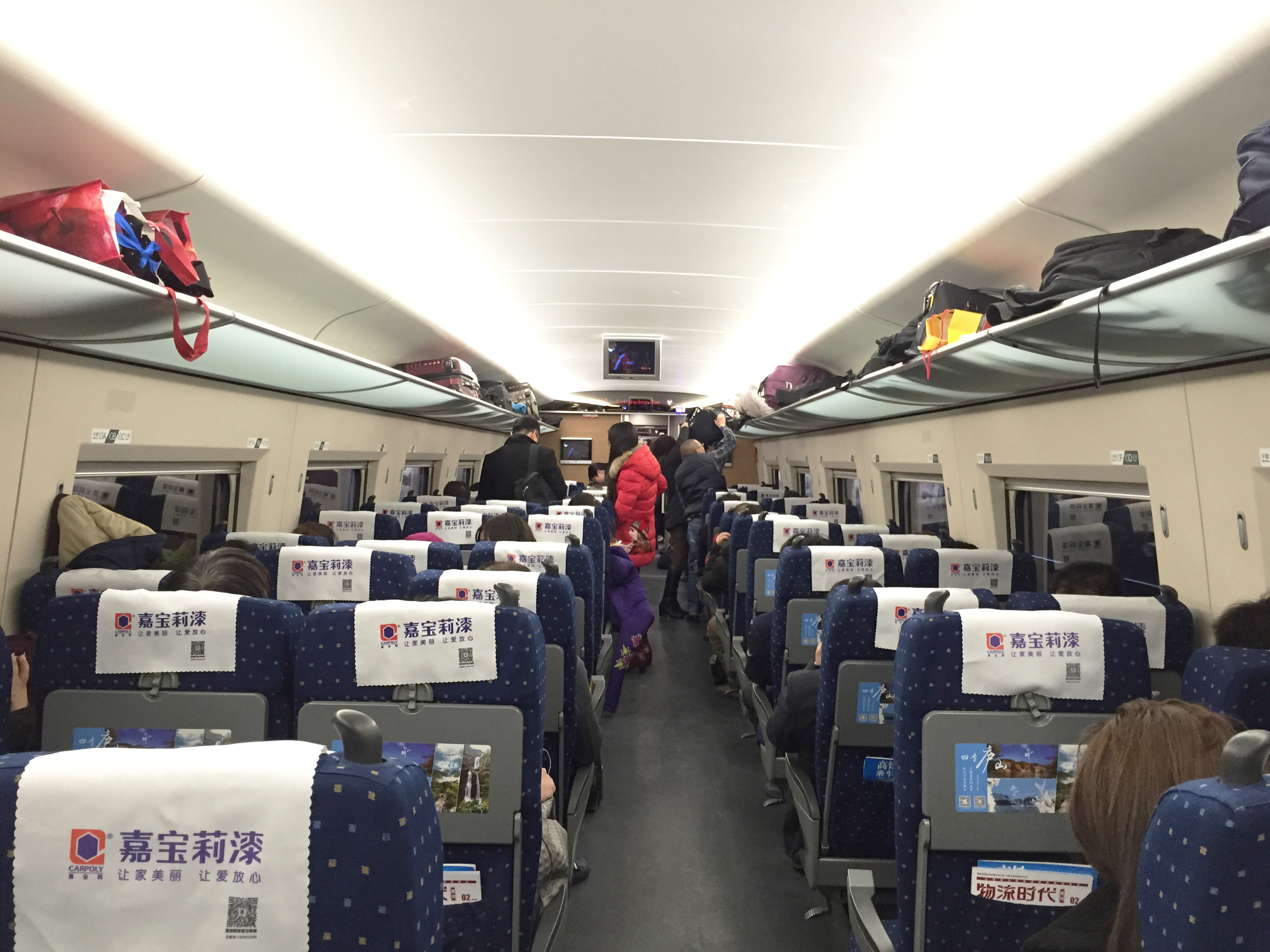
Second Class Coach

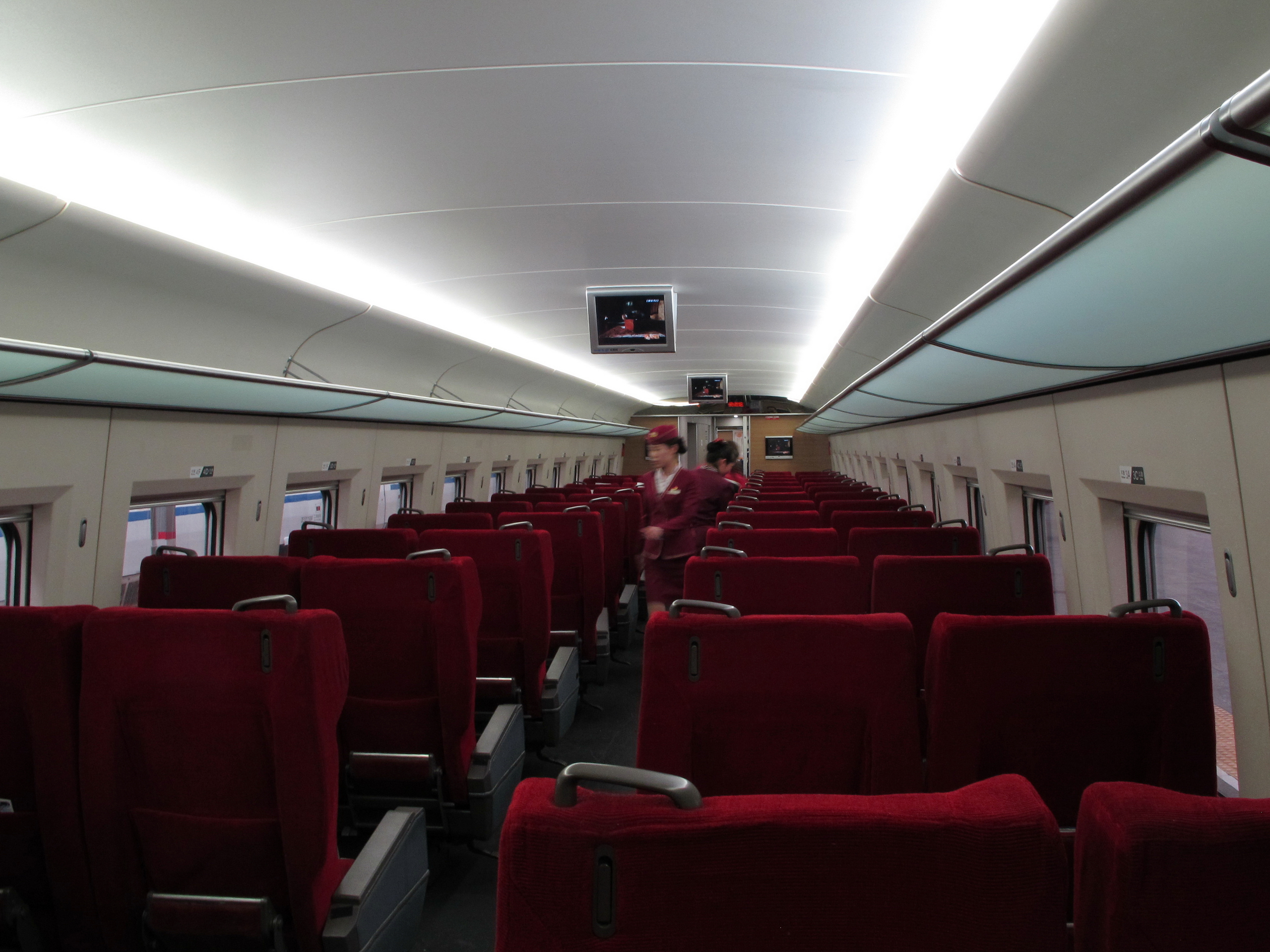
First Class Coach

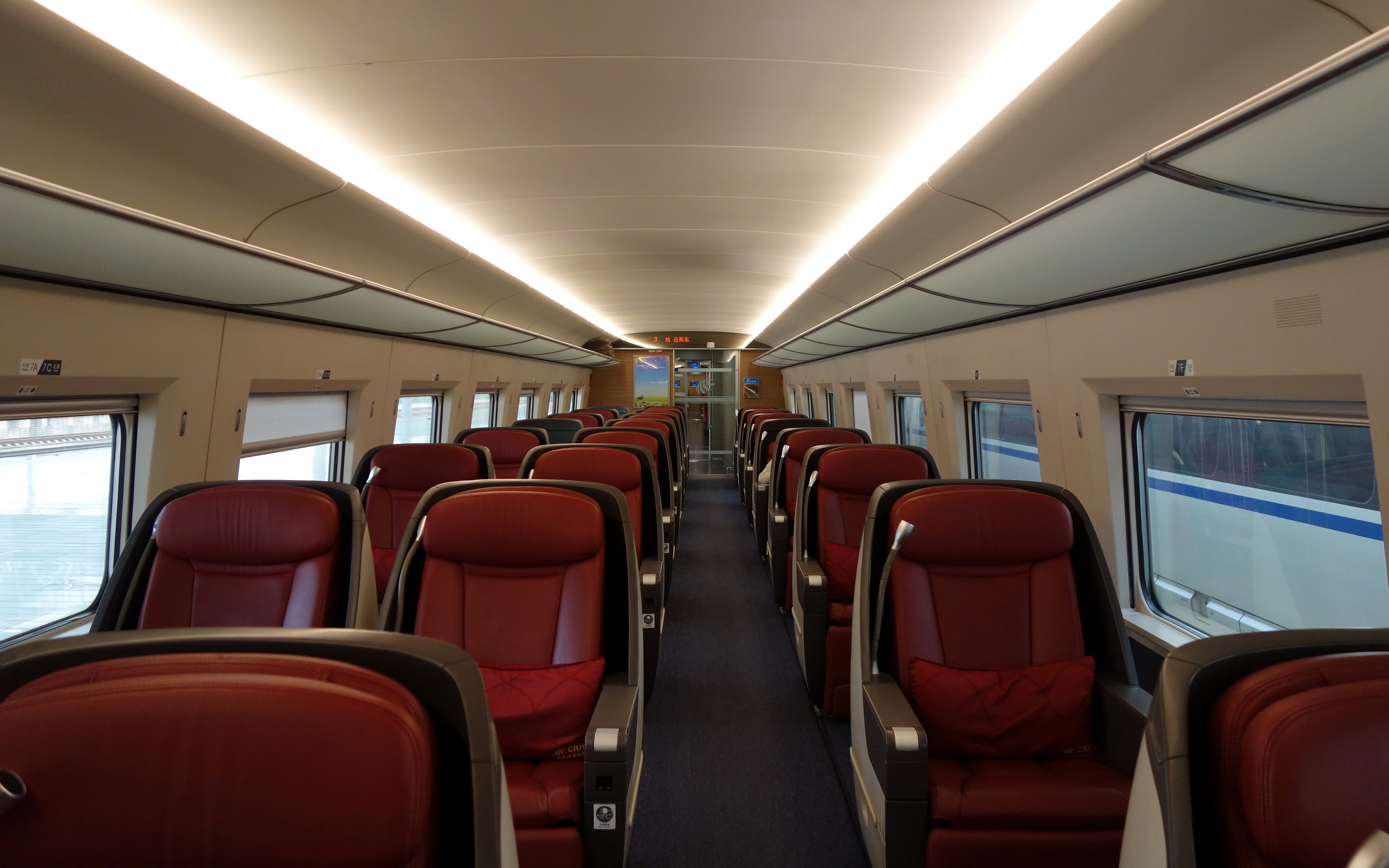
Business Class Coach

== Criticism ==
Kawasaki Heavy Industries claims the trains design was Shinkansen derived without citation to the previous technology.

== See also ==
- China Railway CRH2
- China Railway comprehensive inspection trains
- Vibrant Express
- Fastest trains in China
- Fastech 360
- List of high-speed trains
