= Wuhan–Guangzhou high-speed railway =

Railway line in China

Beijing–Guangzhou–Shenzhen–Hong Kong high-speed railway Wuhan–Guangzhou section

Overview
- Other names: Wuhan–Guangzhou high-speed railway; Wuguang high-speed railway
- Native name: 京广深港高速铁路武广段 京广高速线武汉至广州段
- Status: Operational
- Owner: CR Wuhan; CR Guangzhou
- Locale: Hubei province; Hunan province; Guangdong province
- Termini: Wuhan; Guangzhou South
- Stations: 18

Service
- Type: High-speed rail
- System: China Railway High-speed
- Operators: CR Wuhan; CR Guangzhou
- Rolling stock: CRH2C; CRH3C; CRH380A, CRH380AL; CRH380BL
- Daily ridership: 56,400

History
- Opened: December 26, 2009 (Wuhan–Guangzhou North); January 30, 2010 (Guangzhou North–Guangzhou South)

Technical
- Line length: 968 km (601 mi)
- Num of tracks: 2 (Double-track)
- Track gauge: 1,435 mm (4 ft 8 1/2 in) standard gauge
- Minimum radius: 7,000 m (4.3 mi)
- Electrification: 25 kV 50 Hz AC (Overhead line)
- Operating speed: 350 km/h (220 mph)
- Maximum incline: 20‰

Wuhan–Guangzhou high-speed railway
- Simplified Chinese: 武广高速铁路
- Traditional Chinese: 武廣高速鐵路
Transcriptions
Standard Mandarin
- Hanyu Pinyin: Wǔguǎng Gāosù Tiělù
Yue: Cantonese
- Jyutping: mou^{5}gwong^{2} gou^{1}cuk^{1} tit^{3}lou^{6}

Beijing–Guangzhou–Shenzhen–Hong Kong HSR, Wuhan–Guangzhou section
- Simplified Chinese: 京广深港高速铁路武广段
- Traditional Chinese: 京廣深港高速鐵路武廣段
Transcriptions
Standard Mandarin
- Hanyu Pinyin: Jīngguǎngshēngǎng gāosù tiělù Wǔ-Guǎng duàn
Yue: Cantonese
- Jyutping: ging^{1}gwong^{2}sam^{1}gong^{2} gou^{1}cuk^{1} tit^{3}lou^{6} mou^{5}gwong^{2} dyun^{6}

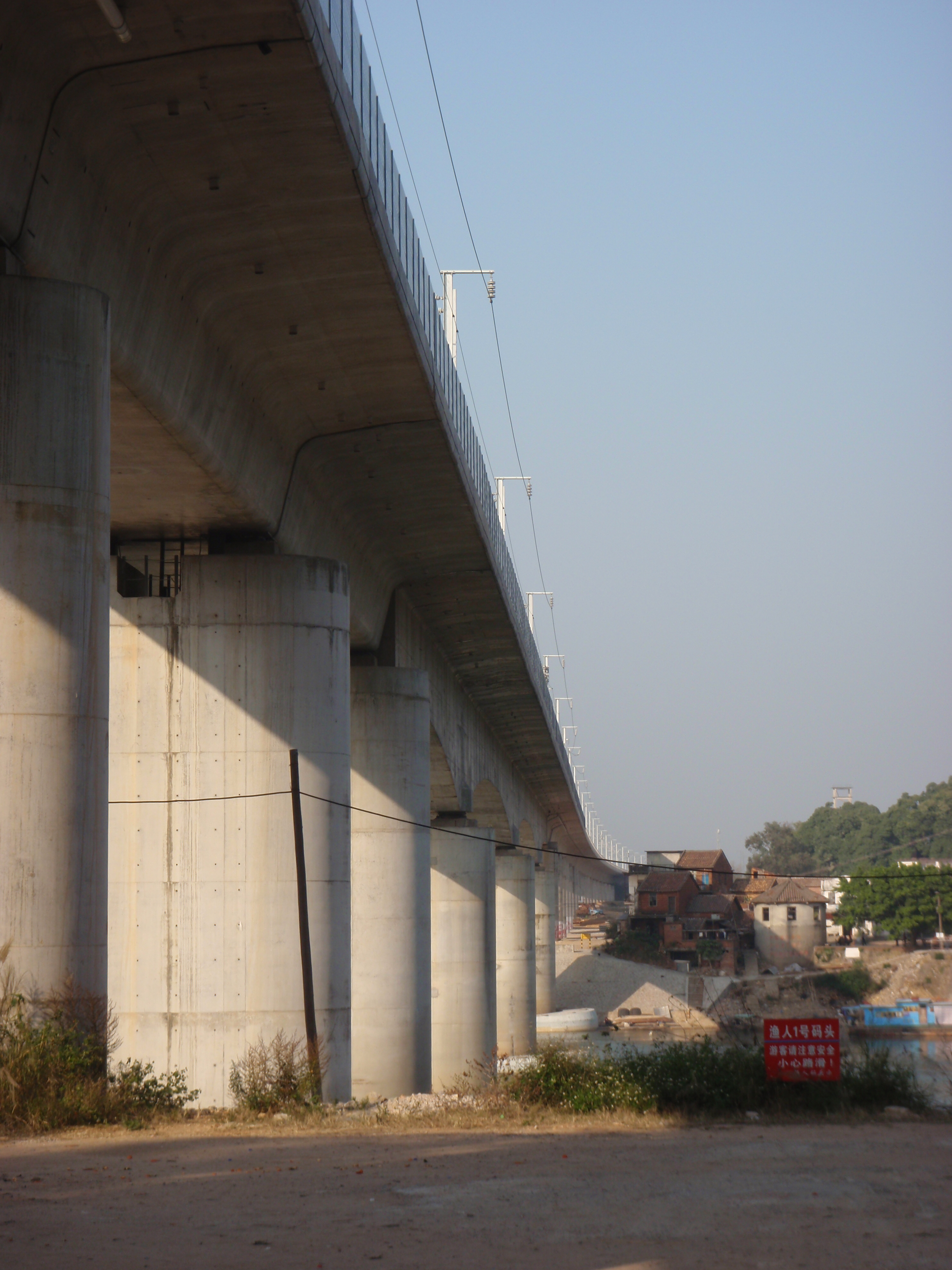
A viaduct carrying the railway

The Wuhan–Guangzhou high-speed railway, also called the Wuguang high-speed railway and short for Beijing–Guangzhou high-speed railway, Wuhan–Guangzhou section, is a 968-kilometre (601 mi) high-speed rail line, operated by China Railway High-speed (CRH), connecting Wuhan and Guangzhou, the provincial capitals of Hubei and Guangdong, respectively. It was the world's fastest train service, initially using coupled CRH2C and CRH3C trains which averages 313 km/h (194 mph) in non-stop commercial service.

The line is part of the 2,118-km long Beijing–Guangzhou high-speed railway. Since the railway line opened ten years ago, it has transported 500 million passengers and provided over 500000 train services.

== Rolling stock ==
When the line opened, the trains had a maximum in-service speed of 350 km/h (217 mph) according to Chinese sources. Each train consists of two eight-car electric multiple units coupled together to make a 16-car train. The passenger capacity of the train is about 1114 (CRH3C×2) or 1220 (CRH2C×2). The trains are based on technology developed by Siemens (China Railways CRH3) and Kawasaki (China Railways CRH2) modified to the standards of China Railway High-speed. The trains used on the line are manufactured in China.

On December 3, 2010, the new China Railways CRH380A trainset started serving this line.

== Commercial service ==
The first commercial trains left Wuhan and Guangzhou North at 9:00 am on December 26, 2009, and reached their destinations in three hours, compared with ten and a half hours for the previous service.

From December 28, 2009, (Note: Timetable was slightly different on December 26 and 27.) until Guangzhou South Station was opened on January 30, 2010, 28 passenger train services run on the line daily each way. Of these 28 trains, two run between Wuhan and Changsha South, five run between Changsha South and Guangzhou North, and 21 run between Wuhan and Guangzhou North.

Nonstop trains, now cancelled, covered the 922 km (573 mi) long journey in a scheduled 02h57m (Southbound) or 02h58m (Northbound). (Note: In the first day of its service on December 26, train G1001 finished the 922-km distance in 02h48m, and arrived at Guangzhou North ten minutes ahead of schedule, averaging 329 km/h (204 mph)) This is an average speed of 313 km/h (194 mph) between stations. Before this line was opened, the fastest commercial train service between stations was the train run between Lorraine TGV and Champagne TGV in France, averaging 279 km/h (173 mph).

Guangzhou South Railway Station was opened on January 30, 2010, just before the Chinese New Year. Trains arrive at or depart from Guangzhou South instead of Guangzhou North since then. During the first 56 days in 2010, the railway transported 1.108 million people, or 43 thousand per day. The total ticket income was about ¥700 million, exceeding earlier predictions.

More trains have been added to the route since March 3, 2010.

On July 1, 2010, coupled trains were replaced by single trains, and service frequency was doubled – from two daily non-stop 03h08m-long services between Wuhan and Guangzhou to six daily 03h16m-long services with one stop in Changsha South – these services departed on the hour (i.e. 08:00, 14:00, 16:00).

On September 20, 2010, even more trains were added. There were then 75 trains in each direction on weekdays and 80 trains in each direction on weekends. The average train interval had been cut to 11 minutes. On October 1, 2010 during the National holidays, the railway line transported 118 thousand people in a single day.

In August 2011 the maximum speed of Chinese high-speed trains was reduced to 300 km/h (186 mph) following the Wenzhou train collision but was restored to 350 km/h (217 mph) in late 2017. In August 2011 the fastest trains between Wuhan and Guangzhou South, with one stop at Changsha South, had a scheduled trip time of 3 hours and 33 minutes.

From April 1, 2012, the service was extended with through trains running between Wuhan and Shenzhen North station. Initially there are 10 services each day in each direction with the fastest train (train no G1014) taking 4 hours, 11 minutes.

Since the railway line opened ten years ago, it has transported 500 million passengers and provided over 500000 train services.

On January 23, 2020, due to the COVID-19 pandemic and as part of the efforts to contain it, the Chinese authorities and city government announced that all services were suspended until further notice.

== Line ==
Construction work began on June 23, 2005. The line cost approximately CN¥116.6 billion. Xu Fangliang was the general engineer in charge of designing the line.

468 km (291 mi) of the railway line is laid on bridges, and 177 km (110 mi) is in tunnels, totaling 2/3 of the entire length. There are 684 bridges and 226 tunnels along the line. The signalling system deployed on the line is CTCS-3.

There are eighteen stations on the line. Fourteen of them are opened for passenger service. The northern terminal, Wuhan Railway Station was opened simultaneously with the railway line. Guangzhou South station was opened later on January 30, 2010. Lechang East and Yingde West stations are under construction. Wulongquan East is an overtaking station which is not open for service.

On December 9, 2009, a train achieved a top speed of 394.2 kilometres per hour (244.9 mph) and took 02h55m to travel from Guangzhou South to Wuhan during a test run.

== Fare ==
The second class fare is about ¥0.465 per kilometer between 0–500 km (0–311 mi), ¥0.415 per kilometer between 500–1,000 km (311–621 mi) and ¥0.365 per kilometer after 1,000 km (621 mi). The first class fare is 60% higher. Deluxe class is also available on CRH3 trains, which is about 80% higher than second class. Like other train services in China, insurance of ¥0.0011722 per kilometer is included for every ticket. The ratemaking distance is based on the existing Jingguang Railway, not the actual rail distance of the new railway. Hence, though the actual rail distance between Wuhan and Guangzhou South is 968 km (601 mi), 1,069 km (664 mi) is charged. The ticket price between the two terminal stations is ¥490 and ¥780 ($75 and $115 in U.S. currency).

== Comments ==
=== Reaction from existing passengers ===
With an average speed 4 times faster, the fare for the high-speed railway is also about 4 times expensive than the ordinary railway fare. Some believe this is too high for the public. RMB490 is about 15% of the average monthly income of workers in Guangzhou. After opening of the high-speed railway, 13 out of 45 ordinary trains were cancelled, a decision criticized to have harmed the welfare of low-income workers. Hence, the existing passengers complain that they are "forced to travel high-speed".

Many passengers also disliked the cancellation of many of the "conventional" trains that used to provide overnight service between Wuhan and Guangzhou (or between Changsha and Guangzhou). While they were much slower than the new high-speed train, overnight service (which has been much reduced now) provided the convenience of traveling while sleeping.

There has also been some vocal criticism of a lack of group discounts, so organised tour operators have to pay full fares for every tourist, when airlines will offer special discounts. With airlines reducing services on the high-speed routes, high-speed rail is the only effective time saving option during the short holiday breaks, such as Mid-Autumn Festival, May Day and Qing Ming Festival, making such trips more expensive.

=== Reaction from airlines ===
China Southern Airlines, a national airline which hubs in Guangzhou, spoke of concern over eroding market share from competition. 38 of 160 plus China Southern domestic routes will compete with the rail line. The airline has aggressively cut fares, slashing the advance purchase price of flights between Wuhan and Guangzhou by almost half.

Tan Wangeng, president of China Southern Airlines, said, "In the long run, the coming of high-speed railway age is an opportunity rather than challenge to our airline company. China Southern is expecting cooperation with the railway company to extend the market and develop more packaged travel products for the passengers."

== Gallery ==
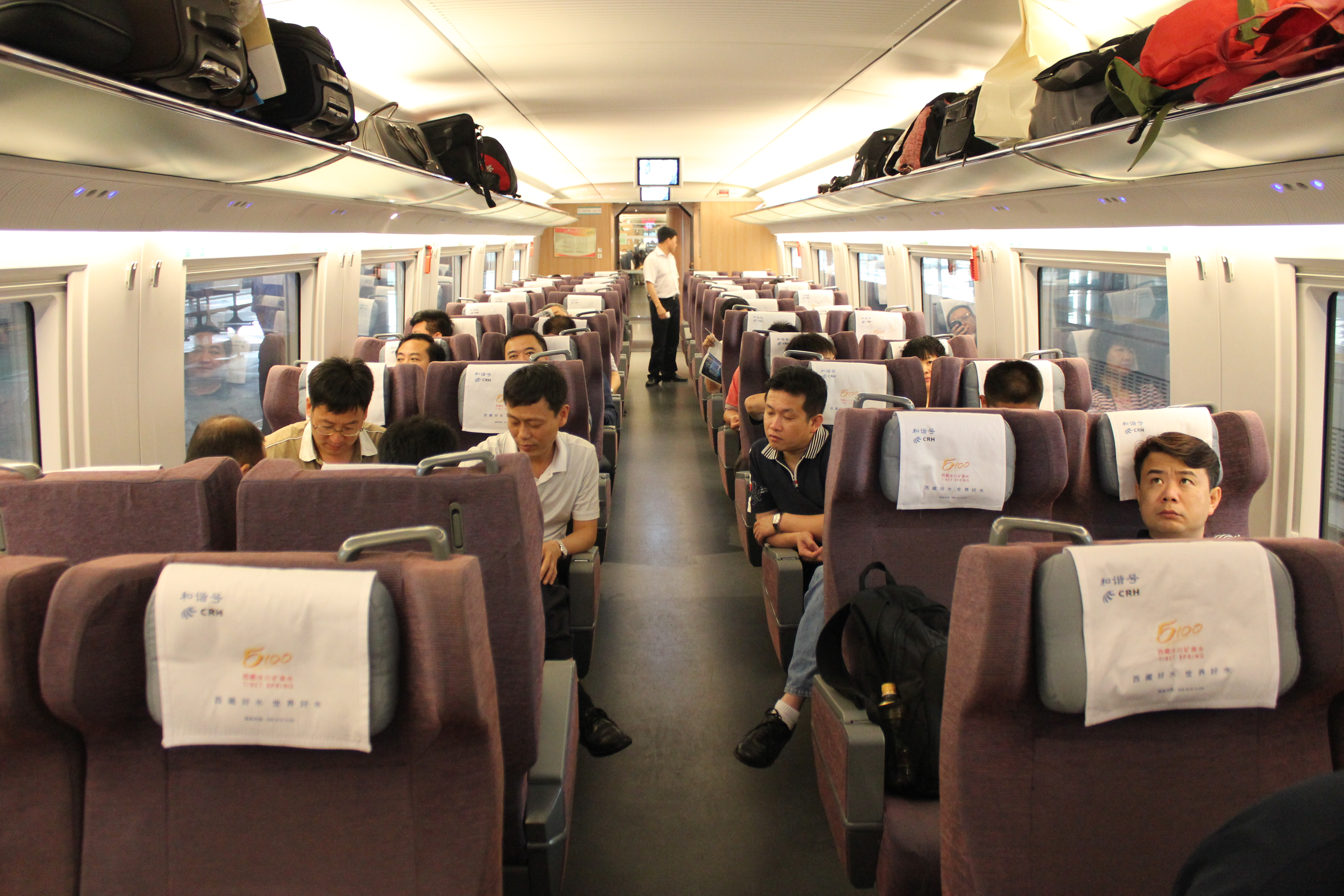
First Class of WuGuang Express Railway

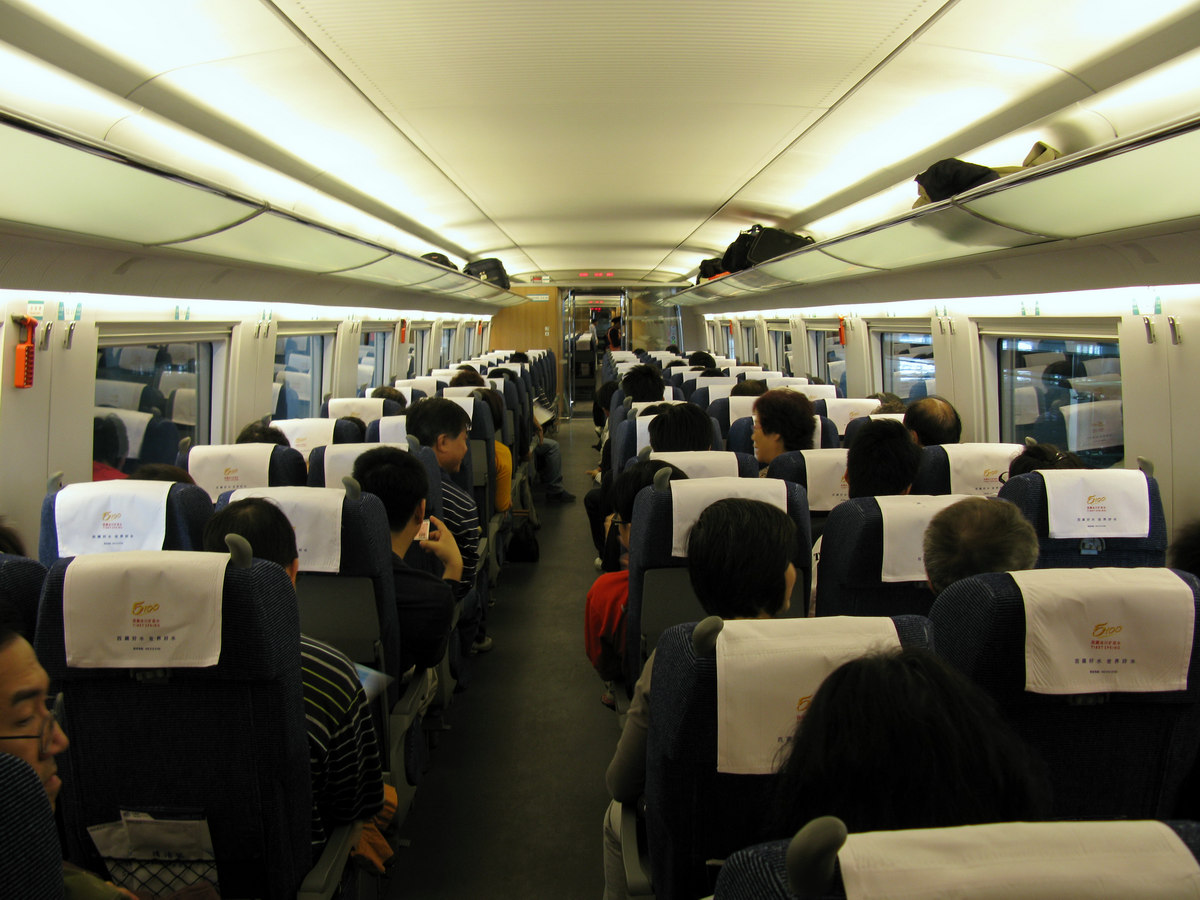
Second Class of WuGuang Express Railway

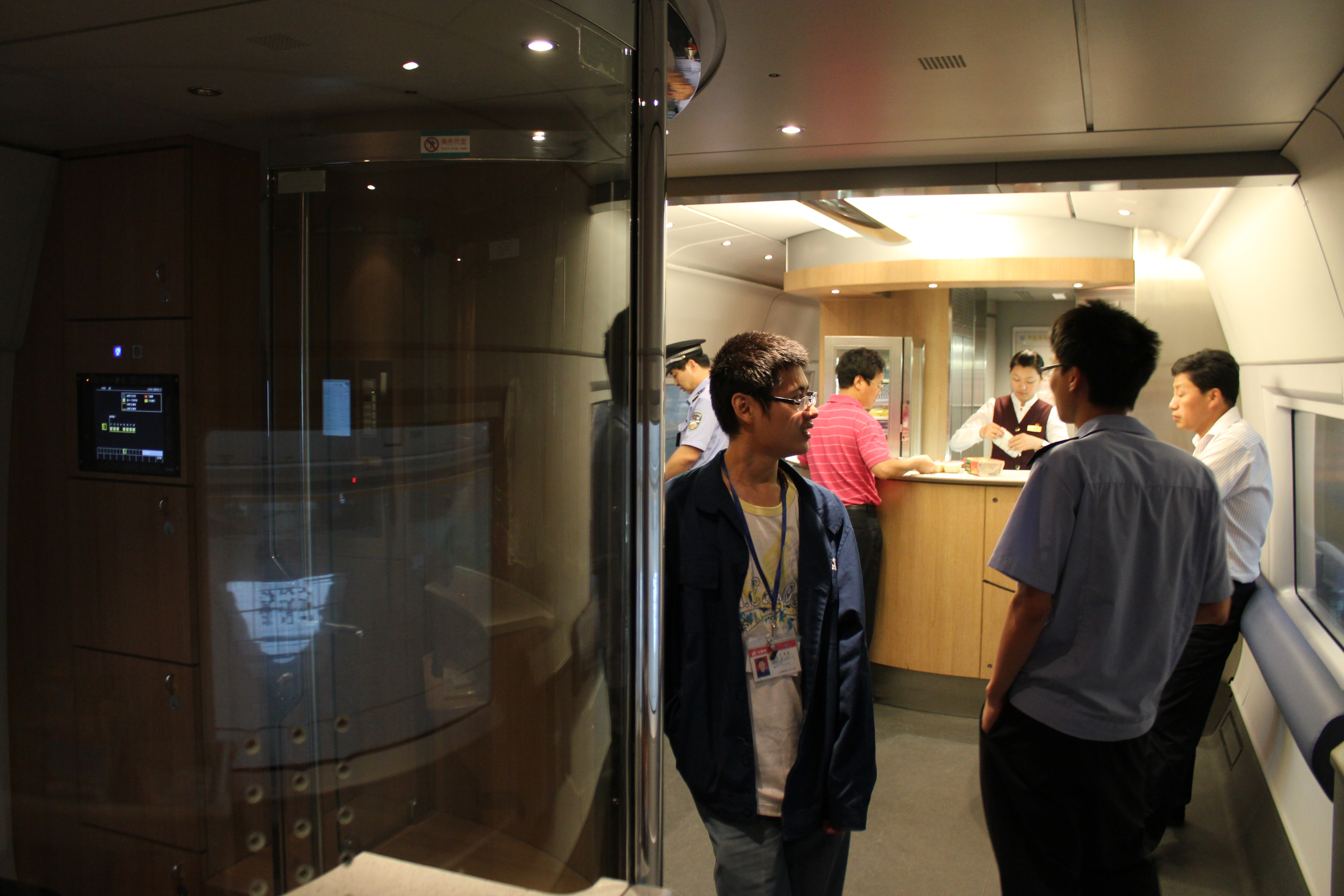
Dining car in the CRH3

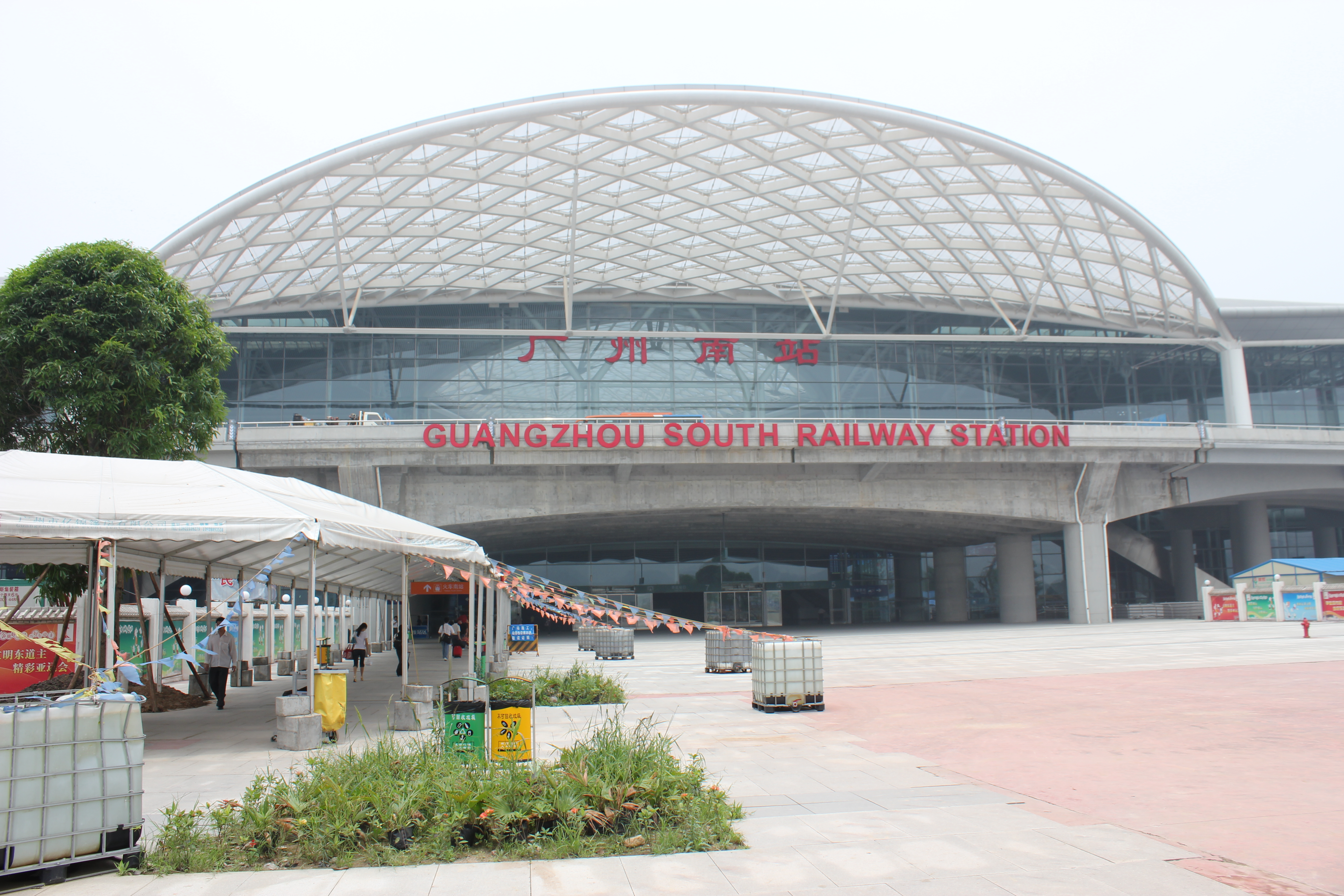
Guangzhou South Railway Station

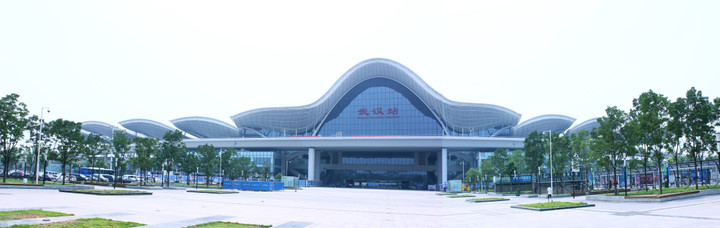
Wuhan Railway Station

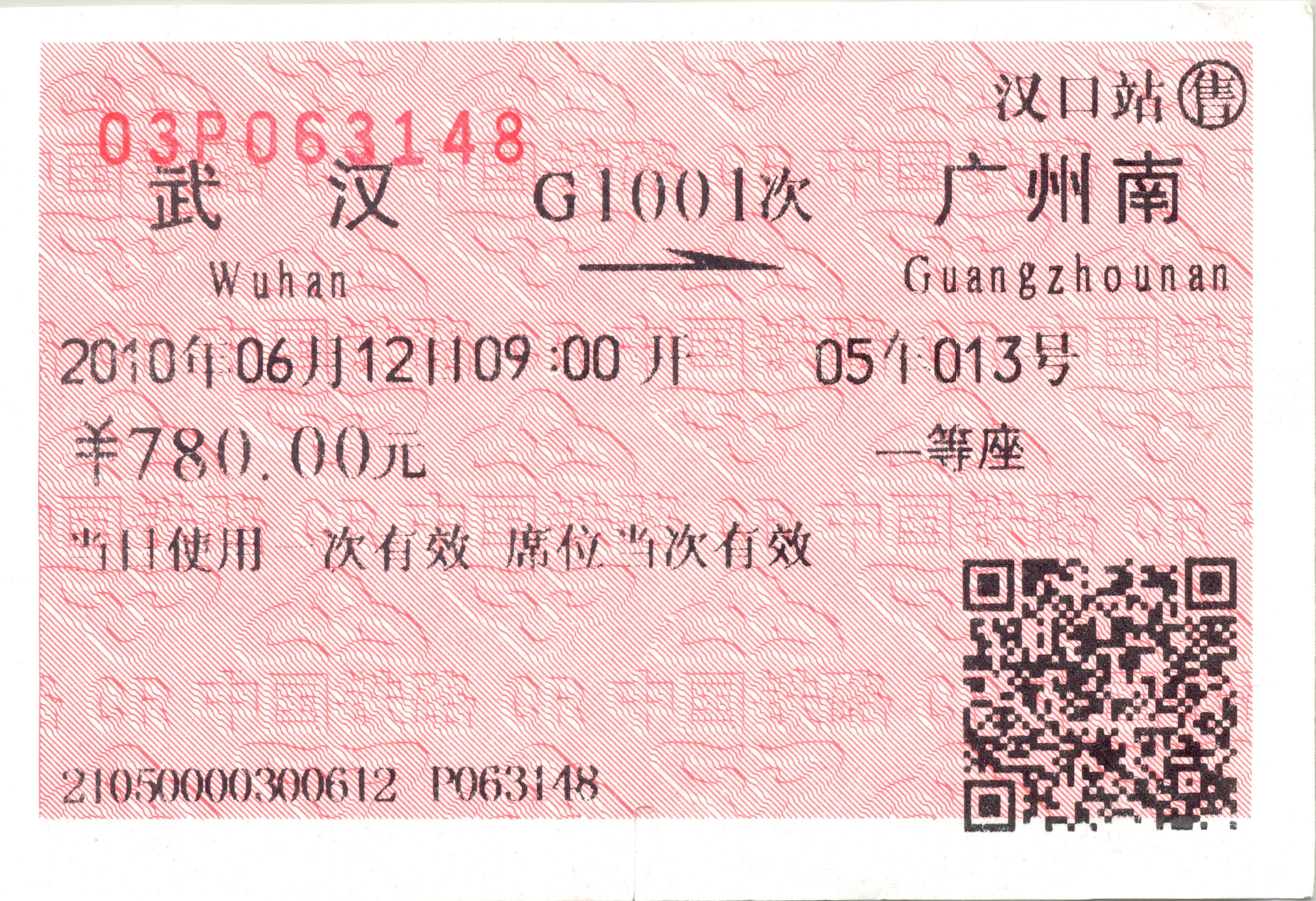
Ticket

== See also ==
- Land speed record for rail vehicles
