= Jinshan Temple =

Jinshan Temple (Chinese: 金山寺; pinyin: Jīnshān Sì), may refer to the following Buddhist temples in China:

- Jinshan Temple (Zhenjiang), in Zhenjiang, Jiangsu
- Jinshan Temple (Wenzhou), in Wenzhou, Zhejiang
- Jinshan Temple (Chengmai County), in Chengmai County, Hainan
- Jinshan Temple (Kaijiang County), in Kaijiang County, Sichuan
- Jinshan Temple (Ziyang), in Ziyang, Sichuan
- Jinshan Temple (Fujian), in Fuzhou, Fujian
- Jinshan Temple (Fuzhou), in Linchuan District of Fuzhou, Jiangxi
- Jinshan Temple (Jinchang), in Jinchang, Gansu
- Jinshan Temple (Mengzhou), in Mengzhou, Henan
- Jinshan Temple (Hebi), in Hebi, Henan
- Jinshan Temple, a Chinese opera based on the Legend of the White Snake, related to the temple in Zhenjiang
