= Jinshan Temple (Hebi) =

Buddhist temple in Hebi, Henan, China

- 金山寺
- Location within Henan Location within China

Religion
- Affiliation: Buddhism
- Deity: Chan Buddhism

Location
- Location: Qibin District, Hebi, Henan
- Country: China
- Interactive map of Jinshan Temple
- Coordinates: 35°48′14″N 114°13′54″E

Architecture
- Style: Chinese architecture
- Established: Tang dynasty
- Completed: Yuan dynasty (reconstruction)

Jinshan Temple (Chinese: 金山寺; pinyin: Jīnshān Sì) is a Buddhist temple located in Qibin District of Hebi, Henan, China. It is approximately 5 kilometres (3.1 mi) southwest of the city of Hebi. Jinshan Temple is the birthplace of the Chinese legend Legend of the White Snake (Madame White Snake).

== History ==
Jinshan Temple was first built in the Tang dynasty (618–907) and rebuilt in the Jiayou period (1056–1063) of the Northern Song dynasty (960–1127). In the reign of Emperor Huizong (1341–1370) of the Yuan dynasty (1271–1368), the emperor issued the decree rebuilding the temple.

Jinshan Temple was officially reopened to the public in 2004.
