= Paste Noodles (Jiang Mian Tiao) =

Regional food from Henan, China

Jiang Mian Tiao (Chinese: 浆面条), also known as Paste Noodles or Jiang fan (浆饭), is a regional food from Henan, China. It is a kind of noodle made from a unique process utilizing fermented bean milk. It is simple to make, cheap, well-flavored, uniquely sour, and helps with digestion. This food is often found as street food or at marketplaces and train stations.

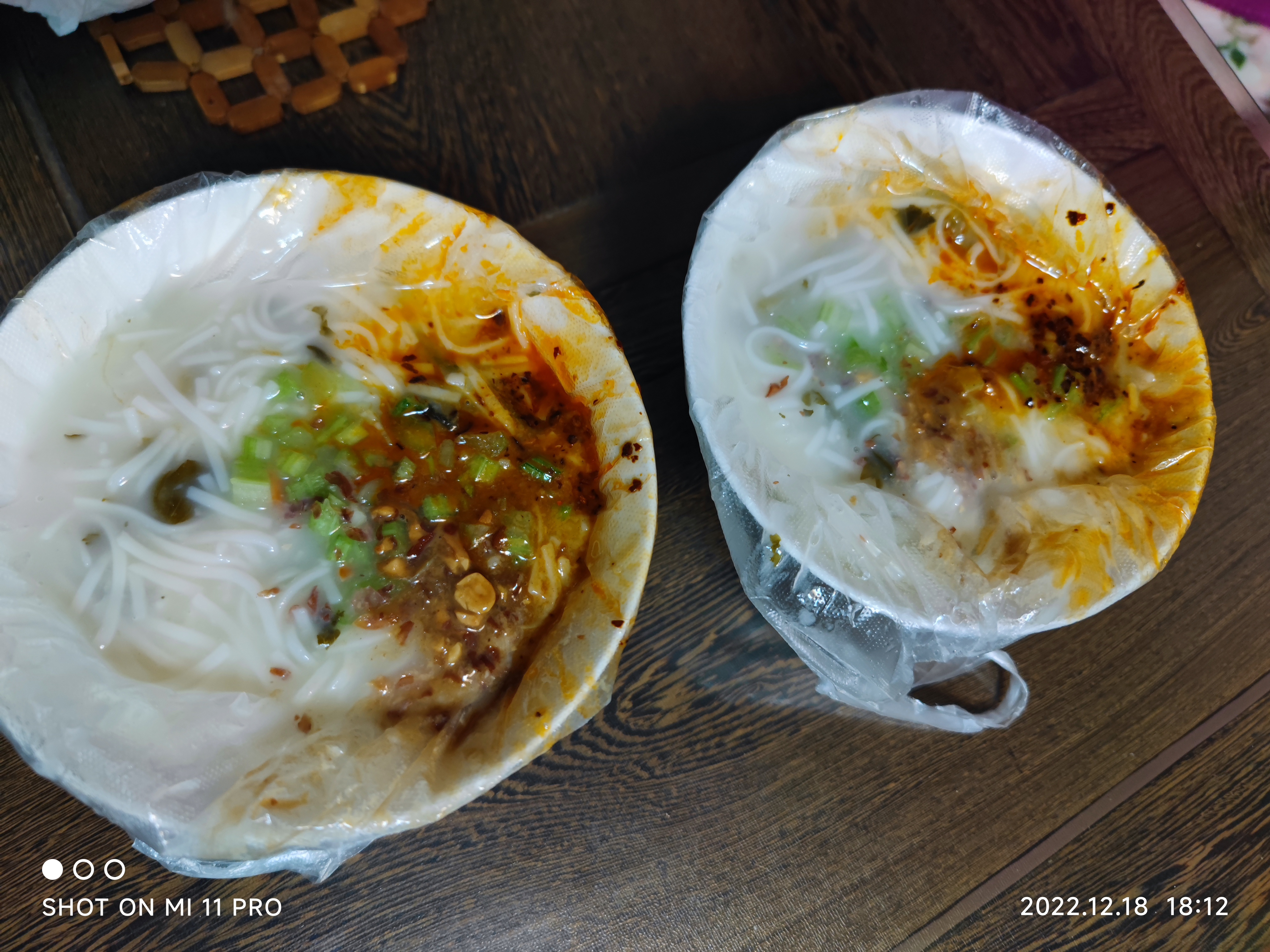
Jiang mian tiao in Zhengzhou, Henan, China

Along with Hui Mian and Xiaolongbao, they are known as the three main flour-made foods of the Zhong Yuan region. It is not to be confused with Hu Tu Mian, which looks similar but are completely different foods. Different regions in Hen nan and at different times have variations of the food; the most famous is Luoyang Jiang Mian Tiao.

== History ==
Based on historical texts, some form of this food existed from 2500 years ago. However, it is too old to verify how the food originated.

=== Historical Myth #1 ===
Long ago, during the Zhengde era in Luoyang, a man had a bustling restaurant. One year, it was a bad harvest for wheat but a good harvest for peas, so the restaurant sold pea noodles daily, causing poor business. One day, an imperial commissioner and his servants passed by for a meal. Not having good quality ingredients, the restaurant owner scrambled to cook. When he saw the bowl of crushed peas and noodles on the table, he came up with the idea to make noodles using the peas to make broths and added other spices. The commissioner was greatly pleased after the meal. Since then, the owner has kept this recipe in his store and thus popularized his restaurant, and this dish became Jiang Mian Tiao.

=== Historical Myth #2 ===
During the East Han dynasty, when Emperor Guangwu was escaping from Wang Mang's hunt, they stumbled upon a house near Luoyang. The emperor had been traveling day and night and had little food and water. Unfortunately, the household was poor and had little to offer; they only had some dry noodles and some outdated and already fermented mung bean milk. The emperor was starving and could not care more, so the house owner cooked the fermented bean milk and noodles. Surprisingly, the emperor enjoyed the meal and thought it was delicious. Later, when Guangwu was restored to power, he included this dish in the royal feasts.

=== Historical Myth #3 ===
A poor family from Luoyang during the late Qing dynasty had mung bean milk that turned sour. Not wanting to throw it away, they added some vegetables and cooked it with low fire to turn it into a paste-like texture. The result was surprisingly savory, and the recipe has spread since then. Luoyang had mostly poor families during that period, so people could not afford noodles and used vegetables as substitutes. Sometimes people would add foxtail millet to the mung bean paste. In modern families, the recipe becomes more well-rounded, using actual noodles and often adding celery, fried peanuts, etc.
