= Hebi East railway station =

Railway station in Hebi, Henan, China

Hebidong 鹤壁东
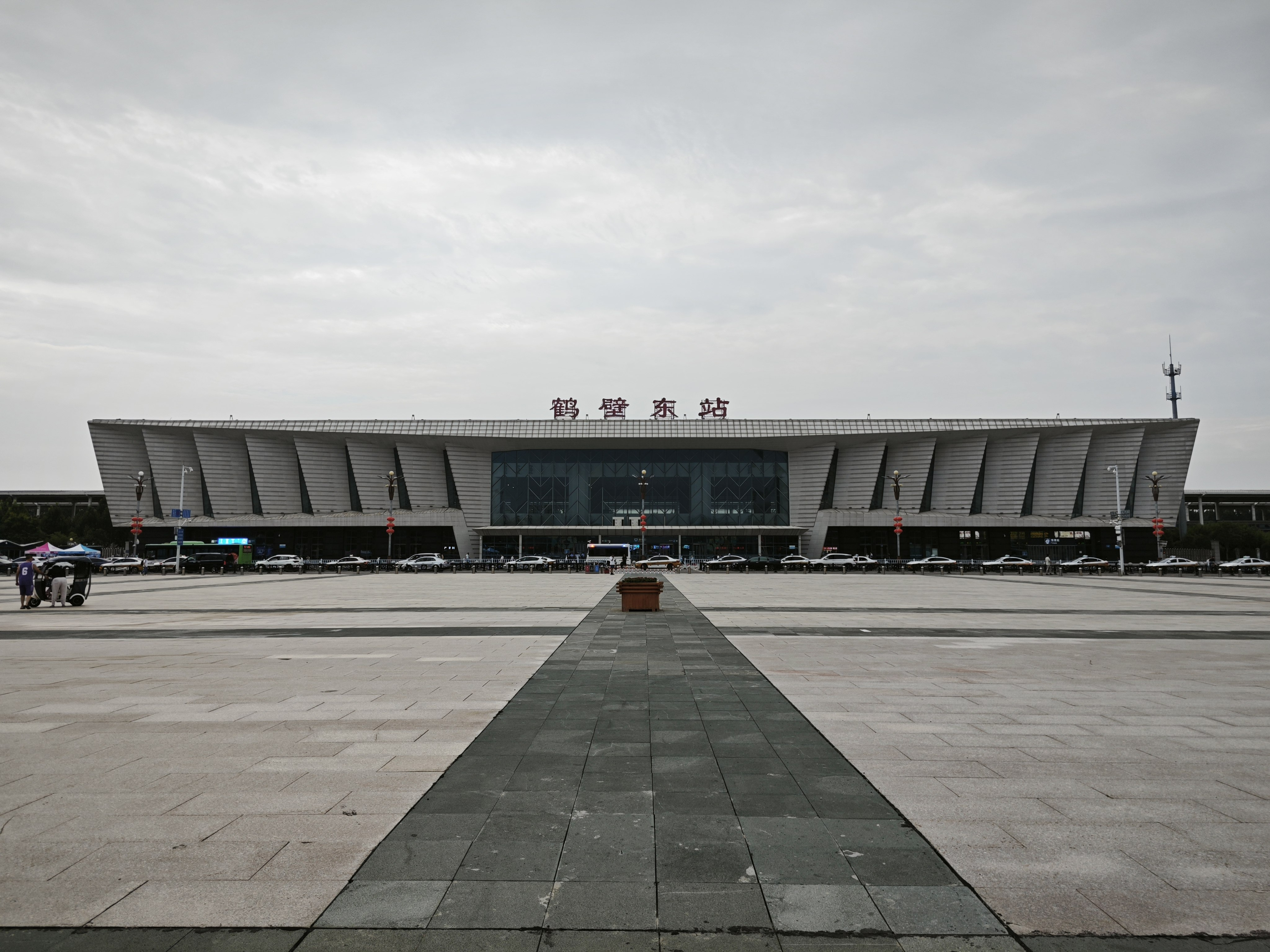
- Panoramic view of the station building

General information
- Other names: Hebi East
- Location: Chaoge Road; Qibin District, Hebi, Henan; China
- Operator: CR Zhengzhou
- Line: Shijiazhuang–Wuhan high-speed railway
- Platforms: 4
- Tracks: 6
- Connections: Bus

Other information
- Station code: 22534 (TMIS code); HFF (telegraph code); HBD (Pinyin code)
- Classification: Second Class station

History
- Opened: December 26, 2012

Services
Preceding station	China Railway High-speed	Following station
Anyang East towards Shijiazhuang	Shijiazhuang–Wuhan high-speed railway	Xinxiang East towards Wuhan
Location

Hebi East railway station (Chinese: 鹤壁东站) is a railway station on the Beijing–Guangzhou–Shenzhen–Hong Kong high-speed railway located in Hebi City, Henan Province, People's Republic of China. It opened with the Beijing–Zhengzhou section of the railway on 26 December 2012.
