= Xinzhen =

Xinzhen (新镇) could refer to the following locations in China:

- Xinzhen Subdistrict, Fangshan District, Beijing
- Xinzhen, Hebei, in Wen'an County
- Xinzhen, Henan, town in Xun County
