= Xiaohe, Henan =

Coordinates: 35.59171°N 114.43109°E

Xiaohe 小河镇
- Town

Chinese transcription(s)
- Interactive map of Xiaohe
- Country: China
- Province: Henan
- Prefecture: Hebi
- County: Xun County
- Time zone: UTC+8 (China Standard Time)

Xiaohe (Chinese: 小河) is a town situated in Xun County, Hebi in the province of Henan, China.

== See also ==
- List of township-level divisions of Henan
