= Hui mian =

Henan-style noodle soup

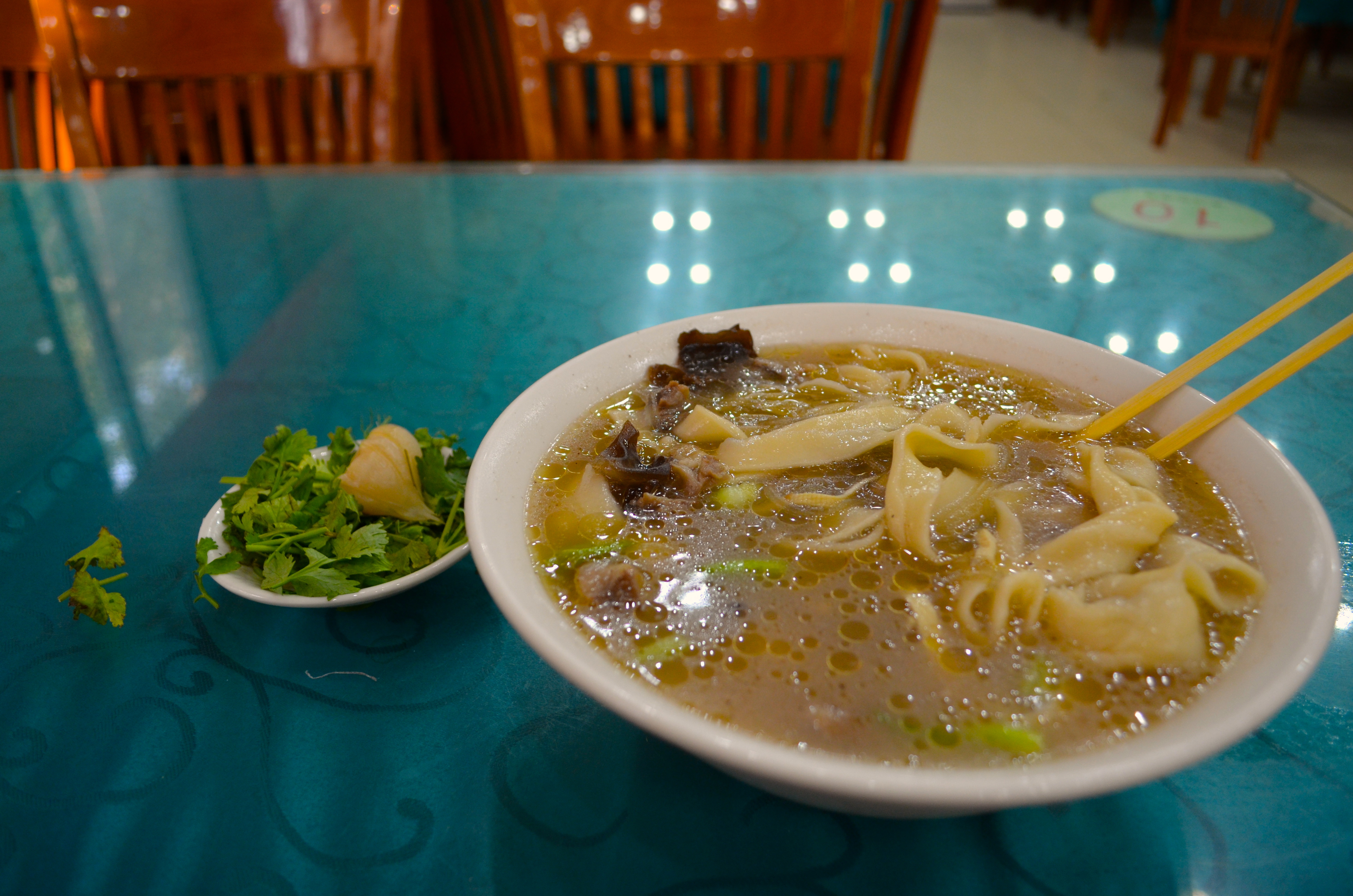
A bowl of hui mian.

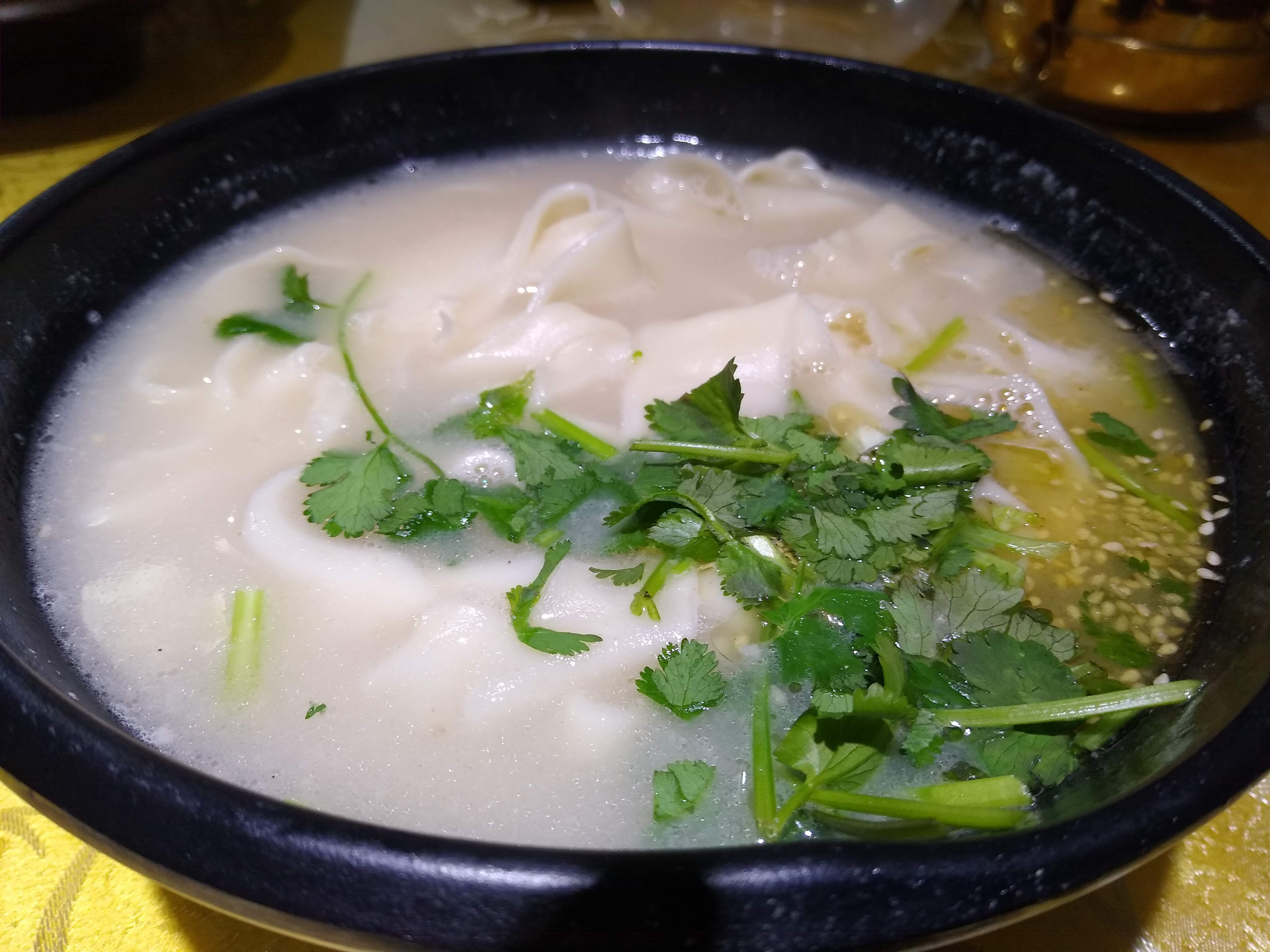
Hui mian without beef at a Shenzhen restaurant.

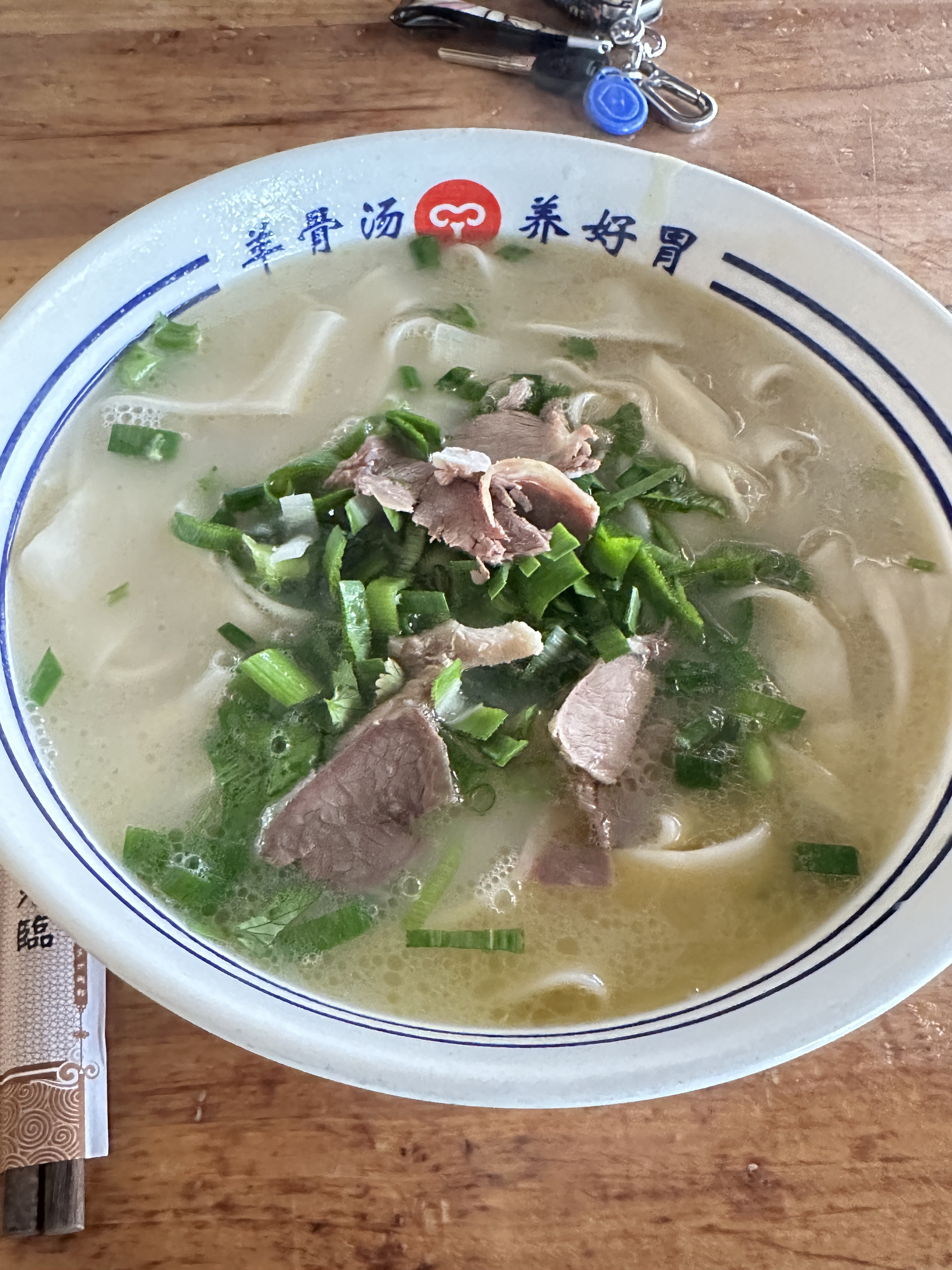
mutton huimian

Hui mian (Chinese: 烩面) is a Henan-style noodle soup. The ingredients used in the dish vary across different cities and restaurants. Typically, hui mian is made with lamb bones and a range of Chinese herbs, such as Lycium chinense and star anise. However, kelp, tofu, coriander, quail eggs, chili oil, sugar, garlic, and minced peppers are also common ingredients.

The taste of hui mian is soft, delicate, and chewy, as the noodles are repeatedly kneaded as they are made. The unique taste of seasoning is also one of the characteristics of hui mian, with a spicy and fragrant flavor, which is known to be appetizing. The taste of hui mian is described as slightly heavy but not too salty or greasy, making it a very healthy delicacy.

When tasting hui mian, different ingredients can be chosen according to personal taste, such as tofu, vegetables, and different meats. When eating, seasoning can be mixed with noodles or poured onto noodles, and different eating methods can be chosen according to personal preference. At the same time, it can be paired with a bowl of hot soup or cold dishes, which can better match the taste of hui mian.

The dish must cook for at least five hours, until the broth is a distinct milky white color.

Hui mian is a traditional and flavorful snack that combines meat, vegetables, soup, and noodles into one dish. Renowned for its delicious taste and affordability, it is popular throughout Central China and across the country. Depending on the ingredients, Huimian can be categorized into lamb Huimian, beef Huimian, seafood Huimian, and five-flavor Huimian, among others. The noodles used in Henan Huimian are pulled noodles, similar to ramen but with slight differences. Typically, fine white flour is mixed with a bit of salt and alkali to create a soft dough, which is repeatedly kneaded to develop elasticity. The essence of Huimian lies in its broth. The lamb broth is made from high-quality fresh lamb, which is soaked multiple times before cooking. The blood foam is skimmed off, and a full array of spices is added to cook the meat until tender. When cooking the noodles, the original lamb broth is used, and the noodles are pulled into thin strips and added to the pot along with lamb, daylily, wood ear mushrooms, and rice noodles. The dish is served with side plates of cilantro, chili oil, and pickled garlic, enhancing its fresh flavor. With fragrant noodles, tender meat, rich taste, and an economical price, Huimian has become one of the most iconic snacks in the central plains region.

== History ==
The hui mian recipe is widespread and originated in the Tang dynasty. It was said that hui mian was invented by a woman who tried to make a nutritious soup for Li Shimin, the second emperor, to help him recover his strength while on the run from the war. Li loved the dish, so Li found the lady a year later after he became the emperor of the Tang Dynasty. The emperor then commanded his royal chefs to study the recipe from that lady.

Hui mian became a secret food in royal families. Centuries later, in the late Qing Dynasty, when the Eight-Nation Alliance invaded China, Dowager Ci Xi was recorded saying that she often had hui mian during the run from the war, and that "hui mian can dispel the cold". Until the end of the Qing Dynasty, royal chef Pang Enfu escaped from the Forbidden City and lived in seclusion in Henan. He started teaching the common people to cook hui mian, and as a result, hui mian began spreading among them.

== Variations ==
The province of Henan is famous for its hui mian. Most hui mian in the Henan area are culinary variants of the original royal recipe. The province has more than a hundred million people, and as a result, many different styles of hui mian have developed between populations and ethnic groups.

=== Yang Fu Yan hui mian ===
Yang Fu Yan hui mian has become famous in recent years in Henan. The Yang Fu Yan recipe follows the traditional cooking style of hui mian, using only mutton and beef as broth, instead of adding pork as other newly developed recipes do.

=== Heji Lamb hui mian ===
Heji Lamb hui mian is a Halal variant. The predecessor of Heji style originated from the Old Folks Hotel and Restaurant in Zhengzhou. In 1953, the restaurant was renamed as Heji Restaurant, where "Heji" (Chinese: 合计) means "many people manage together" in Chinese. Since 1967, they have specialized in lamb noodles, and renamed their signature dish to "Heji Lamb hui mian", commonly known as "Heji". In May 1994, Heji hui mian won the award of "all of the famous brand names of food" in China. In December 1997 it won the title of "Chinese famous snacks".

=== Xiaoji Sanxian hui mian ===
Xiao Ji Sanxian hui mian is another common style in Henan. The recipe was created by Xiao Honghe, a yifu noodle (Chinese: 伊府面) chef in the Zhengzhou government-owned Changchun Hotel. After retiring from the government-owned restaurant, he and his two sons opened a hui mian restaurant. His special recipe was inspired by yifu noodle recipes by adding sanxian (Chinese: 三鲜) ingredients to the original mutton or beef broth and mixing the traditional mutton broth with chicken broth and bone broth. Sanxian means using a combination of three umami dressing ingredients, which are commonly shrimp, black wood ear, and baby bamboos. Nowadays, people use a variation of these three dressing ingredients as long as the categories of seafood, fungus, and fresh vegetables can also be called sanxian hui mian.

=== Yexian hui mian ===
The main feature of Yexian hui mian is the mutton hot pot, which is made of high-quality flour. The hui mian soup is made of fresh lamb chops and lamb hooves, and a little more flavorful spice seasoning. Fat but not greasy, light but not thin, with scorched chili oil. It is well known in more than a dozen counties and cities in the surrounding area and belongs to the special flavor category.

=== Junxian Old-fashioned hui mian ===
Jun County is located in the northern part of Henan Province and is the main producing area of high-gluten wheat. As a result, the noodles of the people of Junxian County are more abundant and diverse. The biggest difference between the traditional noodles of Junxian County and other noodles is the secret stir-fried stewed noodles.

Secret stir-fried stew is made with lamb stir-fried with black sauce. The noodles, often handmade, are boiled in clear broth and cooked with mustard, dried shrimps, and added to the stir-fried lamb.

=== Fangcheng hui mian ===
Fangcheng hui mian originated in the early 1980s and was inspired by Zhengzhou hui mian. The noodle chefs combined the characteristics of Fangcheng-there are more Hui people, so they are rich in mutton resources. Then they explored and improved based on Zhengzhou braised noodles. Fangcheng hui mian seems easy to make, but to achieve true taste is by no means what ordinary people can do. To determine whether it is authentic Fangcheng hui mian, one looks at the soup, the second with the noodles, and the third with chili oil.

The soup is prepared by simmering lamb bones on high heat for two hours, then adding mutton pieces and spices to continue simmering. After a few hours, the soup will be thick as milk. Then, handmade, high-gluten noodles are added and cooked in the soup, finishing with chili oil, characteristically made using mutton oil and small red-pointed chili produced in Fangcheng.

== Modern hui mian storage process ==
Due to modern technology and increased demand, many university labs in Henan have developed instant storage of hui mian to keep the taste while making it easy for people to store, move it around, and eat it. The best way for preserving food for storage and easy consumption is "instant frozen".

== See also ==
- Chinese Islamic cuisine
- Chinese noodles
- Instant noodles
- List of Chinese soups
- List of noodle dishes
- Beef noodle soup
- Henan cuisine
- Luoyang
- Zhengzhou
