= Xinzhen, Henan =

Xinzhen 新镇镇
- Town
- Location in Henan
- Coordinates: 35°30′29″N 114°22′05″E
- Country: People's Republic of China
- Province: Henan
- Prefecture-level city: Hebi
- County: Xun
- Elevation: 62 m (203 ft)
- Time zone: UTC+8 (China Standard)
- Area code: 0392

Xinzhen (simplified Chinese: 新镇; traditional Chinese: 新鎮; pinyin: Xīnzhèn; lit. 'new town') is a town in Xun County in northern Henan province, China, located around 25 kilometres (16 mi) southwest of county seat and 27 kilometres (17 mi) south-southeast of downtown Hebi. As of 2011, it has 50 villages under its administration.

== See also ==
- List of township-level divisions of Henan
