= Qi County, Hebi =

Coordinates: 35°36′36″N 114°12′00″E

Qi County 淇县
- County
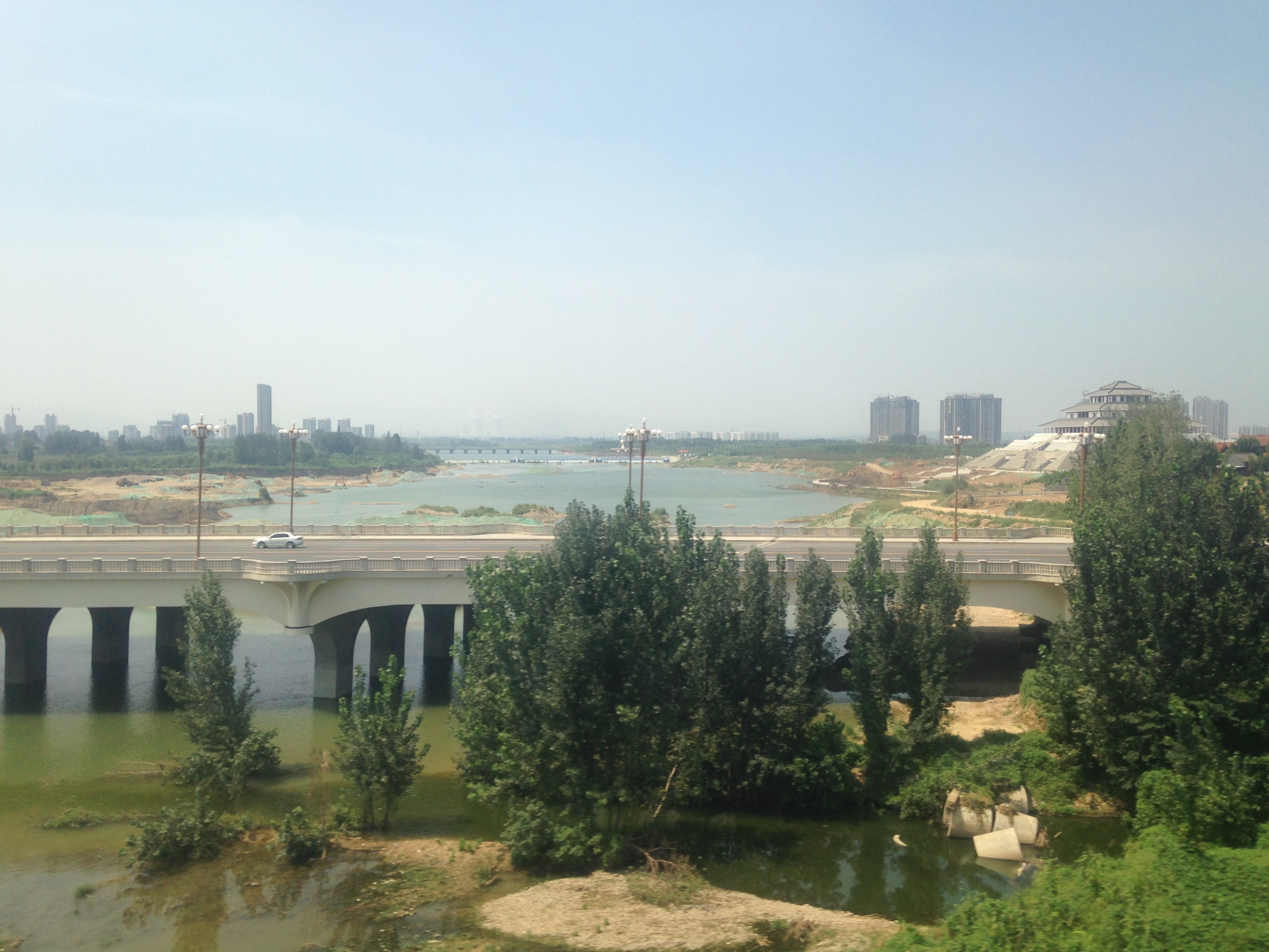

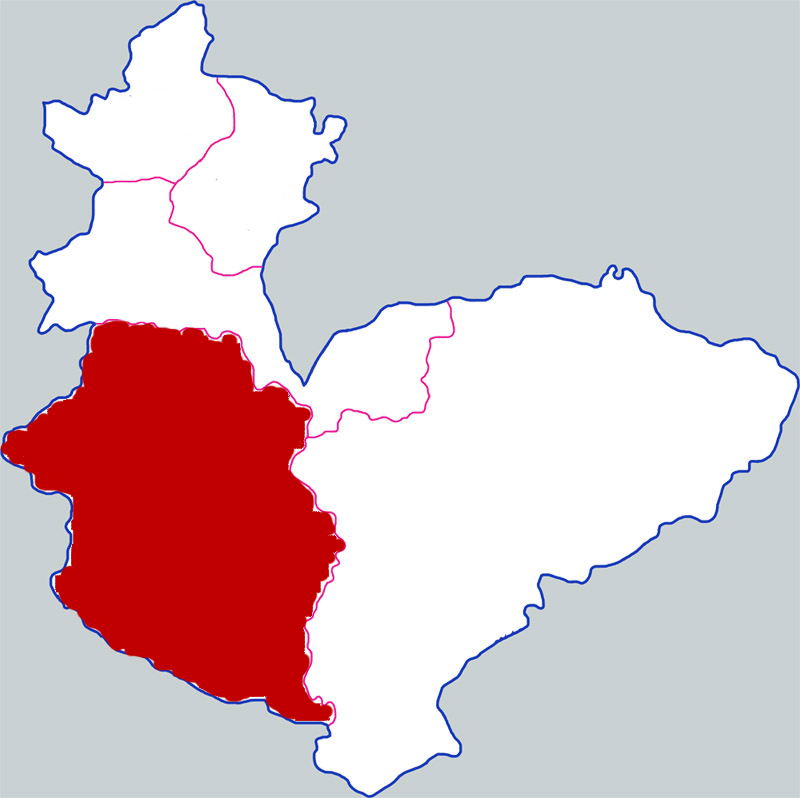
- Qi County in Hebi

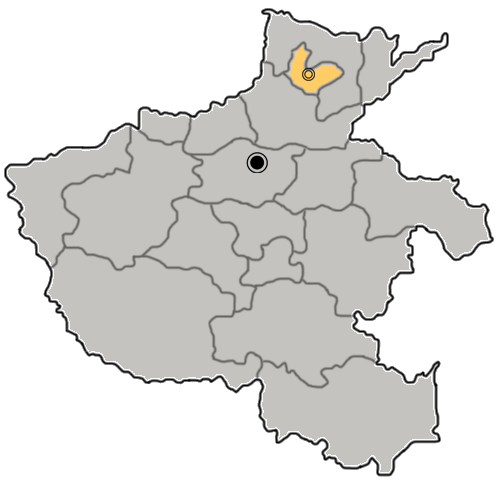
- Hebi in Henan
- Country: People's Republic of China
- Province: Henan
- Prefecture-level city: Hebi

Area
  - Total: 581 km^{2} (224 sq mi)

Population (2019)
  - Total: 279,000
  - Density: 480/km^{2} (1,240/sq mi)
- Time zone: UTC+8 (China Standard)
- Postal code: 456750

Qi County or Qixian (simplified Chinese: 淇县; traditional Chinese: 淇縣; pinyin: Qí Xiàn) is a county in the north of Henan province, China. It is under the administration of the Hebi city. Qi County is the location of Zhaoge, the former capital of the Shang dynasty.

== Administrative divisions ==
As of 2012, this county is divided to 4 subdistricts, 4 towns and 1 townships.

Subdistricts

- Lingshan Subdistrict (灵山街道)
- Qiaomeng Subdistrict (桥盟街道)
- Weidu Subdistrict (卫都街道)
- Zhaoge Subdistrict (朝歌街道)

Towns

- Beiyang (北阳镇)
- Gaocun (高村镇)
- Miaokou (庙口镇)
- Xigang (西岗镇)

Townships

- Huangdong Township (黄洞乡)

== Climate ==
Climate data for Qixian, elevation 70 m (230 ft), (1991–2020 normals, extremes 1981–2010)
Month	Jan	Feb	Mar	Apr	May	Jun	Jul	Aug	Sep	Oct	Nov	Dec	Year
Record high °C (°F)	18.5 (65.3)	26.3 (79.3)	28.1 (82.6)	35.4 (95.7)	38.0 (100.4)	41.9 (107.4)	41.5 (106.7)	37.6 (99.7)	37.9 (100.2)	35.2 (95.4)	27.5 (81.5)	23.5 (74.3)	41.9 (107.4)
Mean daily maximum °C (°F)	5.0 (41.0)	9.1 (48.4)	15.1 (59.2)	21.5 (70.7)	27.2 (81.0)	32.5 (90.5)	32.1 (89.8)	30.6 (87.1)	27.2 (81.0)	21.6 (70.9)	13.3 (55.9)	6.8 (44.2)	20.2 (68.3)
Daily mean °C (°F)	−0.3 (31.5)	3.5 (38.3)	9.3 (48.7)	15.7 (60.3)	21.5 (70.7)	26.6 (79.9)	27.5 (81.5)	26.1 (79.0)	21.6 (70.9)	15.9 (60.6)	8.0 (46.4)	1.5 (34.7)	14.7 (58.5)
Mean daily minimum °C (°F)	−4.4 (24.1)	−1.1 (30.0)	4.1 (39.4)	10.3 (50.5)	15.8 (60.4)	21.0 (69.8)	23.4 (74.1)	22.2 (72.0)	17.1 (62.8)	11.1 (52.0)	3.5 (38.3)	−2.6 (27.3)	10.0 (50.1)
Record low °C (°F)	−17.4 (0.7)	−14.6 (5.7)	−8.3 (17.1)	−1.6 (29.1)	3.1 (37.6)	10.3 (50.5)	13.0 (55.4)	13.4 (56.1)	5.4 (41.7)	−2.1 (28.2)	−14.5 (5.9)	−13.4 (7.9)	−17.4 (0.7)
Average precipitation mm (inches)	4.6 (0.18)	8.4 (0.33)	13.3 (0.52)	31.2 (1.23)	46.6 (1.83)	71.0 (2.80)	172.0 (6.77)	120.3 (4.74)	64.7 (2.55)	28.4 (1.12)	20.1 (0.79)	4.0 (0.16)	584.6 (23.02)
Average precipitation days (≥ 0.1 mm)	2.9	3.1	3.7	5.0	6.3	7.9	11.1	9.8	7.1	5.6	4.6	2.3	69.4
Average snowy days	3.2	2.7	1.1	0.2	0	0	0	0	0	0	1.3	2.6	11.1
Average relative humidity (%)	58	56	56	61	62	58	76	79	72	65	65	61	64
Mean monthly sunshine hours	124.1	135.5	181.3	208.4	228.0	205.5	172.0	183.8	167.2	163.3	139.6	136.1	2,044.8
Percentage possible sunshine	40	44	49	53	52	47	39	44	46	47	46	45	46
Source: China Meteorological Administration
