= Heshan, Hebi =

Heshan 鹤山区
- District
- Location in Henan
- Coordinates: 35°56′33″N 114°11′38″E
- Country: People's Republic of China
- Province: Henan
- Prefecture-level city: Hebi

Area
  - Total: 159 km^{2} (61 sq mi)

Population (2019)
  - Total: 129,800
  - Density: 816/km^{2} (2,110/sq mi)
- Time zone: UTC+8 (China Standard)
- Postal code: 458010
- Website: http://www.hbhsq.gov.cn/

Heshan District (simplified Chinese: 鹤山; traditional Chinese: 鶴山區; pinyin: Hèshān Qū) is a district of the city of Hebi, Henan province, China.

== Administrative divisions ==
As of 2012, this district is divided to 5 subdistricts, 1 town and 1 township.

Subdistricts

- Heshanjie Subdistrict (鹤山街街道)
- Jiukuangchang Subdistrict (九矿广场街道)
- Xinhuajie Subdistrict (新华街街道)
- Zhongshanlu Subdistrict (中山路街道)
- Zhongshanbeijie Subdistrict (中山北路街道)

Towns

- Hebiji (鹤壁集镇)

Townships

- Jijiashan Township (姬家山乡)
