= Shancheng, Hebi =

Coordinates: 35°52′46″N 114°11′54″E

Shancheng 山城区
- District
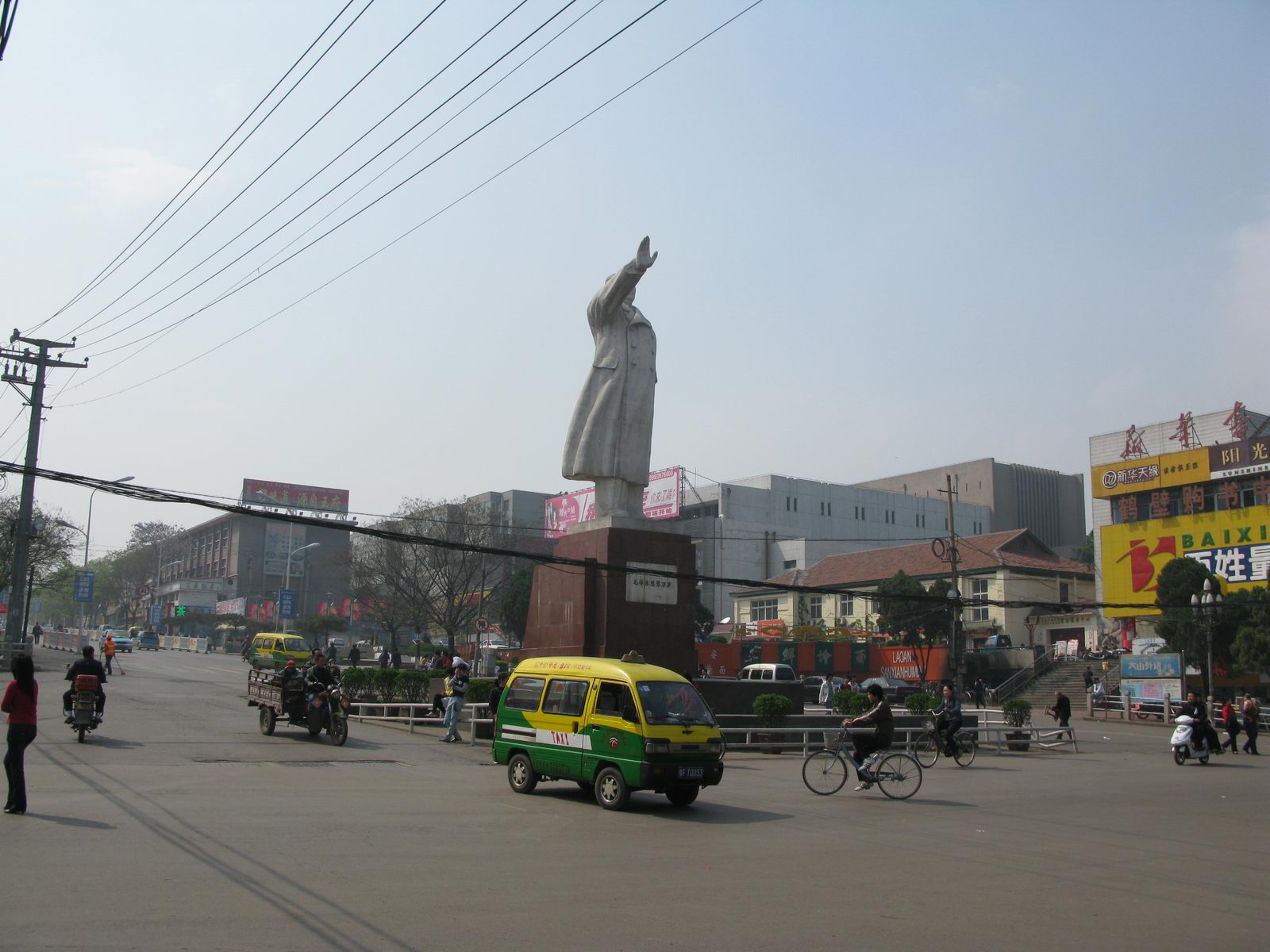

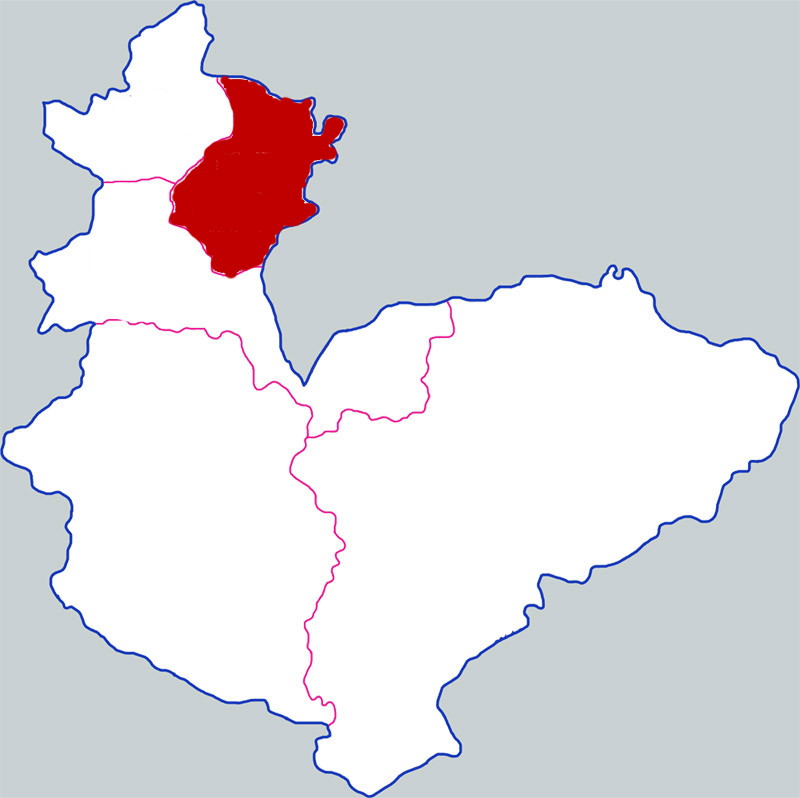

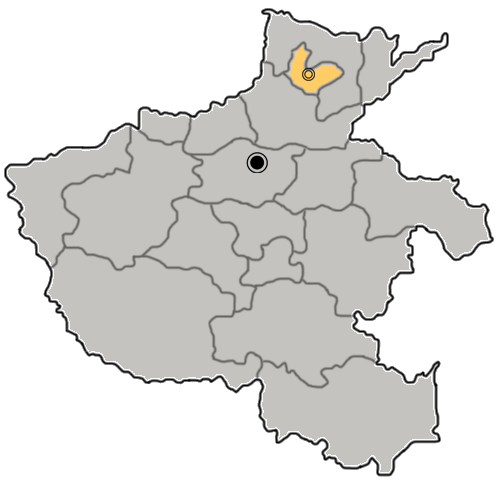
- Country: People's Republic of China
- Province: Henan
- Prefecture-level city: Hebi

Area
  - Total: 176 km^{2} (68 sq mi)

Population (2019)
  - Total: 242,800
  - Density: 1,380/km^{2} (3,570/sq mi)
- Time zone: UTC+8 (China Standard)
- Postal code: 458000
- Website: www.hbscq.gov.cn

Shancheng District (Chinese: 山城区; pinyin: Shānchéng Qū) is situated close to "Old Hebi" town in Hebi, Henan Province, China.

This is also a densely populated area with industries on the outskirts and coal mines. Hebi no. 10 Coal mine is one of the biggest mines in the area.

There is a zoo, and a clean river called the Qi River where people go for relaxation and leisure fishing and swimming in the warm summer months.

== Administrative divisions ==
As of 2020, Shancheng District is divided to seven subdistricts and one town.

=== Subdistricts ===
The district's seven subdistricts are Hongqi Subdistrict, Changfengzhong Road Subdistrict, Shancheng Road Subdistrict, Tangheqiao Subdistrict, Lulou Subdistrict, Baoshan Subdistrict, and Dahu Subdistrict.

=== Towns ===
The district's sole town is Shilin.
