= Henan cuisine =

Native cooking styles of the Henan province in China

- Chinese: 河南菜
Transcriptions
Standard Mandarin
- Hanyu Pinyin: Hénán cài

Yu cuisine
- Chinese: 豫菜
Transcriptions
Standard Mandarin
- Hanyu Pinyin: Yù cài

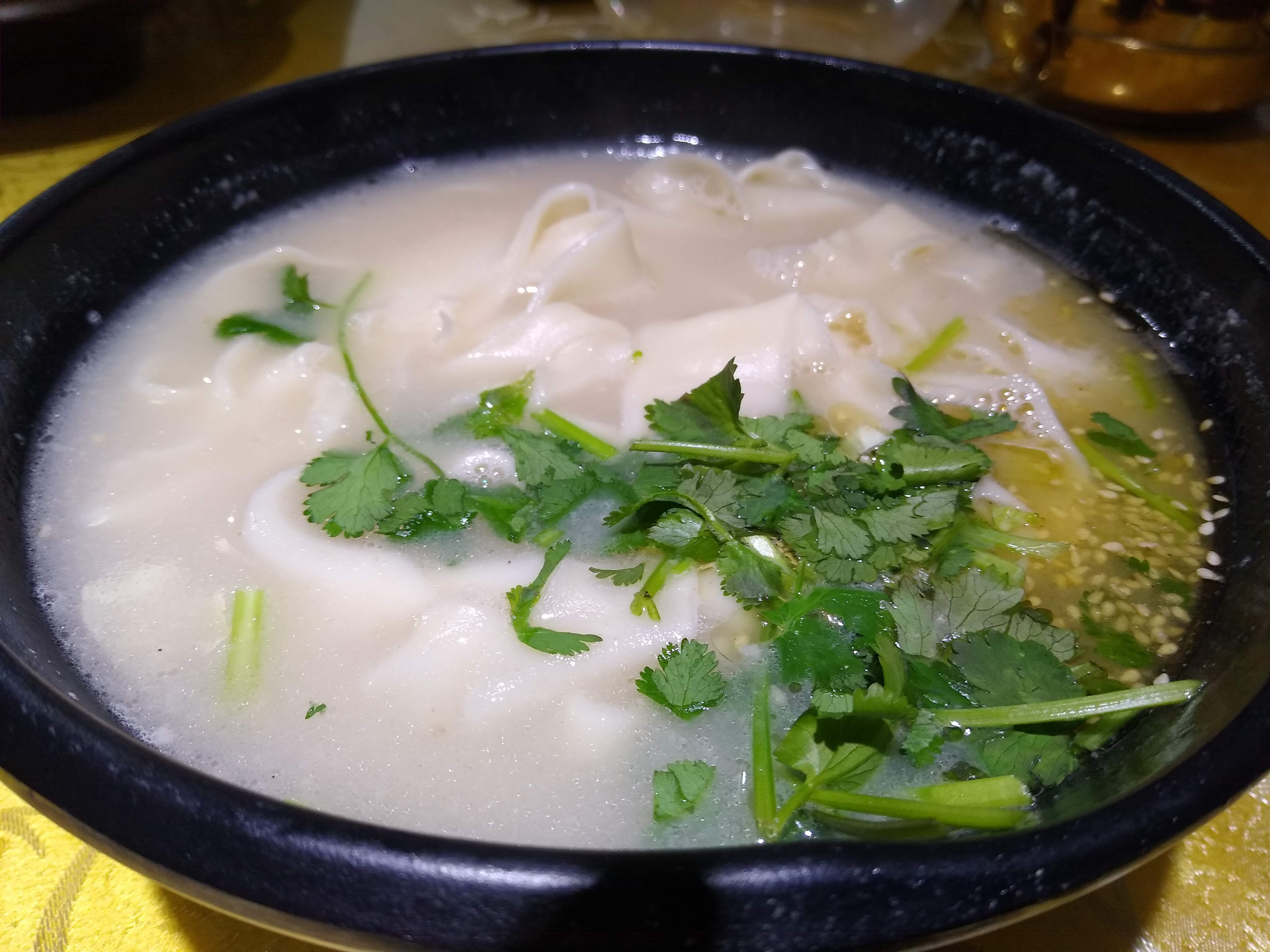
Hui mian

Henan cuisine or Yu cuisine refers to the cooking styles of the Henan province in China. Being landlocked on all sides, the influence of localized culinary styles is plentiful in Henan cuisine, such as blending styles from Jiangsu and Beijing. Henan cuisine is known for its taste variety, including a blend of sour, sweet, bitter, spicy and salty. There are a wide variety of Henan dishes, including carp with fried noodles in sweet and sour sauce, grilled head and tail of black carp, Bianjing roasted duck, stewed noodles with mutton, and spicy soup. Henan cuisine is known for inducing a very moderate and balanced mix of flavours in its dishes, and has one of China's oldest and most traditional cooking styles.

== History ==
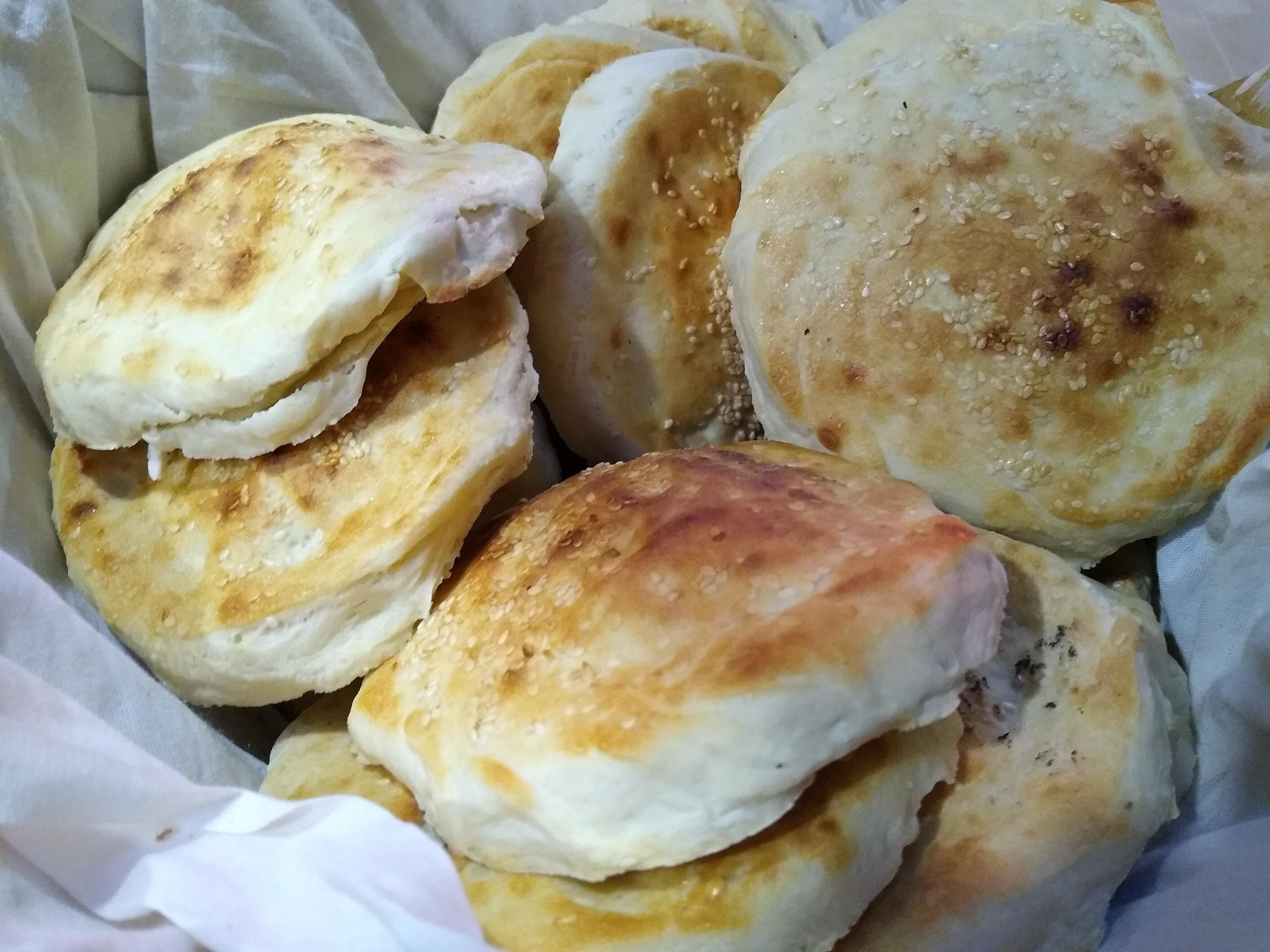
Kaifeng-style shaobing

Henan cuisine dates back to the late Xia dynasty in the 21st to the 17th century BC. Within this period, the entirety of Henan cuisine underwent rapid and robust changes to accommodate the different emerging culinary cultures from the surrounding regions. By the end of the Xia dynasty, there was an entire banquet system based on Henan dishes. By the time the Shang dynasty began in the 17th century BC, Henan cuisine was redesigned with the new seasoning including all different flavours to bring a more harmonious element to it. This formed the base for most of the later Chinese cuisines.

Afterward in the period of the Northern Song dynasty (around 960 – 1127 AD), Henan cuisine reached its zenith. With the establishment of the capital city in Kaifeng, Henan, there was an uprise in the invention of a variety of new snacks. With rapid growth and development in the frying skills of the people, there was a peaking of a rise in fried food as well. Around this time, Henan cuisine was also beginning to be divided into five kinds of dishes based on social status and religious backgrounds. The dishes for the imperial courthouses were different from the ones found in high-class localities, markets, in the temples and those found in common folk households.

With the fall of the Southern Song dynasty around 1170 – 1180 AD, there was a decline in the quality and nature of the Henan cuisine. It was evident that the imperial stronghold was significant for the Henan cuisine to survive and without the strength of the dynasty, the hierarchical structure for Henan cuisine started to break down. Later, based on the original Henan Culinary style in the imperial courts, high class families, markets, temples and households, a mixed blend of contemporary Henan cuisine was developed. Much like the nature of its flavours, harmony in terms of social status was also shown to be a diversifying feature of the Henan cuisine. Over time, contact with the nearby regions on all sides, especially with Beijing and Jiangsu, had styles pour over to the Henan style.

== Cultural relevance ==
Chinese cuisine is intricately linked with the culture of the place it is from. Henan also follows this connection, as it embraces the notion of mean and harmony in most of its cuisines. Given that Henan is an entirely landlocked province, the influence from the neighbouring regions are quite evident in the culture of the province, as much as it is evident in the culinary styles and dishes. One prevalent feature is the use of animal fat. Previously, animal fat was frequently used in Henan cuisine to fry foods, but given partly the influence of neighbouring regions and partly the influence of the growing health concerns, it is slowly seeing a decline.

Henan is one of the oldest provinces of China, which has evolved merging the important food cultures of surrounding regions. The location of the province is in the middle of the four ancient capitals of the country, namely: Anyang, Zhengzhou, Luoyang, and Kaifeng. It is one of the largest provinces in terms of area and is also considered as the origin of the Chinese style of cooking. The cuisine is known by various names due to being used under different dynasties such as Yu cuisine and Zhongyuan. The cuisine shows the collaboration of the cooking style and culinary adherence and adaptation from the surrounding provinces. However, there has been disagreement among the Han Chinese relating to the original style of the cuisine because the province always been a political and economic center in the past, making it almost impossible to trace the historical development of the cuisine. The name Yu cuisine refers to the style which they employ to cook specific dishes of the cuisine. The method of cooking is based on a variety of techniques and is taken from the province to which the dish is related.

== Characteristics ==
Apart from sharing similarities with the Jiangsu cuisine in terms of the extremeness of flavour, Henan cuisine has its own features and characteristics. Onions are a staple of Henan cuisine. The principal meat used in Henan cuisine is pork, but it is not often served in soups. For soups, the primary choice is restricted to mutton and lamb. Like other parts of northern China, the staple crop in most of Henan is wheat, and wheat-based products like shaobing are commonly consumed.

The food culture of a geographical location is frequently found to be influenced by the social, political, and economic factors, and the development involved in all three sectors together combines to form grounds on which the cuisines are built. Another essential factor that contributes to the cuisine and its formation is due to the food crop and raw material found in the region. The staple food of a location is found to be the base on which the cuisine is modified and structured.

The most significant feature of this cuisine arises because of the overlapping method of cooking, which is adapted from Beijing and Jiangsu cuisine and that gives it a very distinct texture and is dependent on the seasonal food. However, the style adopted by Henan cuisine resembles more to that of Jiangsu and is mostly lighter in taste. The most common food material used in terms of meat is pork and is used along with animal fat in most of the dishes. The combined form of the cuisine is achieved with the Yu style of cooking, where many methods such as boiling, stewing, steaming, frying as well deep frying, and along with it, most of the dishes were served with thick sauces made from scratch.

== Dishes ==
Yellow River Carp with Baked Noodles（黄河鲤鱼焙面）: This dish is made by combining two famous dishes: "Sweet and Sour Carp" and "Baked Noodles" that are as thin as hair.

Pan-fried head and tail of grass carp（煎扒青鱼头尾）: The finished dish is jujube red in color, with a rich aroma and tender texture. When eating, a piece of the fish head can be put in the mouth to suck out the brain. The fish meat will also automatically separate from the skull.

Hulatang (Spicy Soup 胡辣汤): Typically made with beef (or mutton), gluten, tofu skin, pepper, chili, and other ingredients, the soup is thick and has a savory, spicy, and numbing flavor. It is often eaten for breakfast.

Zhengzhou braised noodles（羊肉烩面）: Zhengzhou braised noodles come in many varieties, including mutton braised noodles, three-delicacy braised noodles, and five-spice braised noodles.

Braised pork belly（扒广肚）: It has the effects of tonifying the kidneys and lungs, consolidating essence and stopping leukorrhea, replenishing qi and essence, nourishing tendons and veins, stopping bleeding and dispersing blood stasis.

Bianjing Braised Duck（汴京烤鸭）： was a famous dish in the markets during the Song Dynasty. The original method involved cooking the duck by simmering it in ashes, but this evolved into roasting it over an open fire with fruitwood. Roasted duck then replaced braised duck as the mainstream method of preparing duck, and it spread to the north after the Northern Song Dynasty.

One of the most significant dishes is known as Wuxiang shaobing, which is a five-spiced bread and is served with pork meat cooked in several ways. Some of the traditional dishes include soups such as Hu La Soup and Luoyang Water Banquet. There is a mix in the use of meat in the case of the traditional Kaifeng Tai Si Bao, which is made by stuffing one bird into a bigger one and then glazing with animal fats and steaming along with vegetables. It is served as a main course along with loaves of bread. The dish is used as a side dish for the main course and is often found in all the traditional restaurants of Henan. Another recipe which is served in Henan province is Luoyang Water Banquet, which is a soup that involves an intricate cooking technique in which the egg slices are carved in the shape of the peony flower, which is a local favorite in the capital city of Zhengzhou.

Carp on noodles is another main dish which has been adopted from the Kaifeng cuisine, and is served along with sweet and sour soup with the steamed carp covered and deep-fried with noodles. One of the dishes available in a select few restaurants is known as Jiao Hua Ji. It is prepared after the chicken is covered with mud and is then roasted. If the roast is not opened, the chicken tends to last for at least two days. Bianjing Roasted Duck and Grilled Head and tail of Black Carp are two dishes that show the prevalence of sweet and sour taste in cooked meat.
