= Xun County =

Coordinates: 35°40′34″N 114°33′00″E

Xun County 浚县
- County
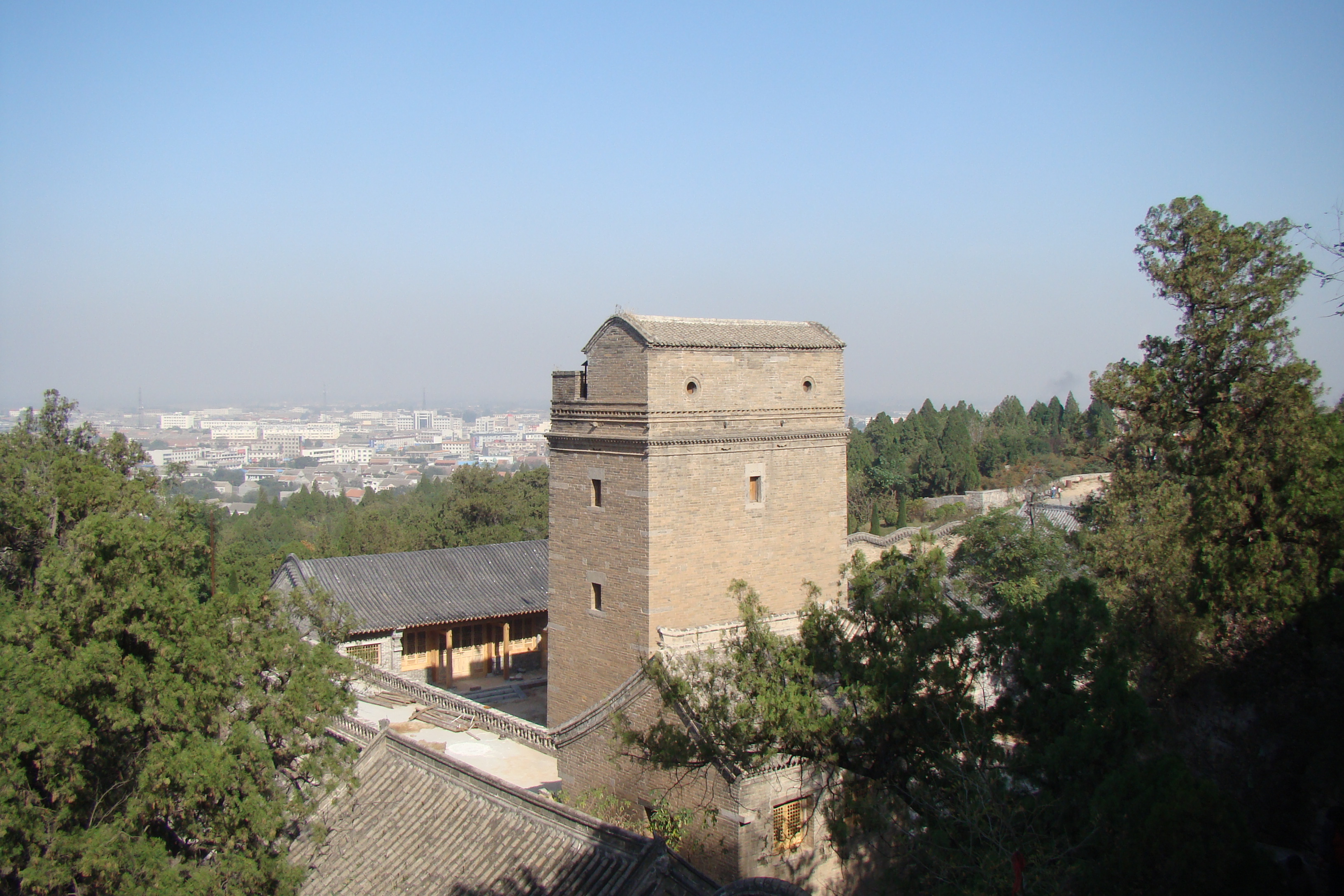

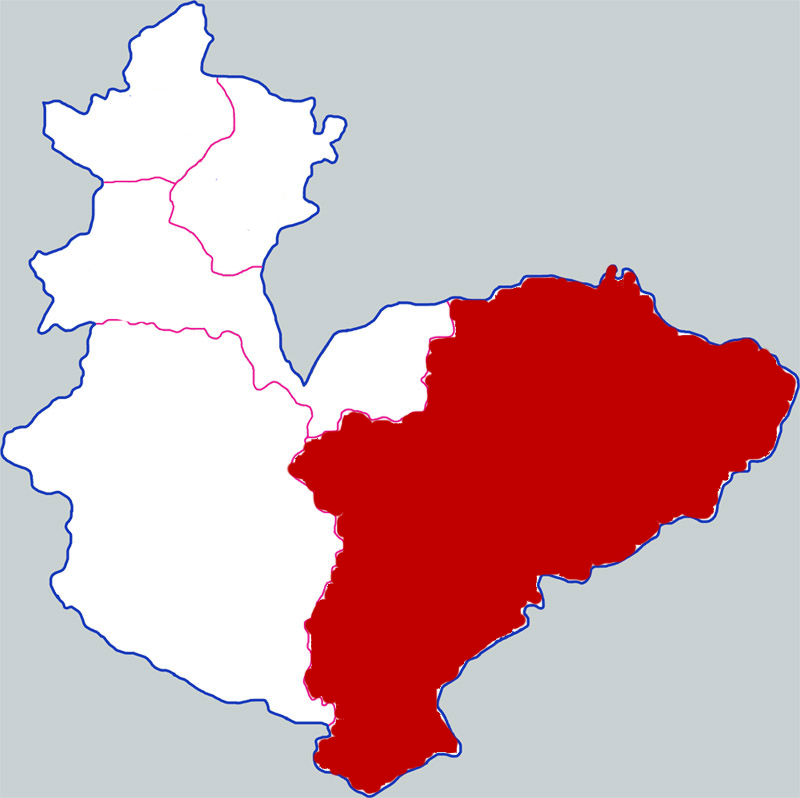
- Xun County in Hebi

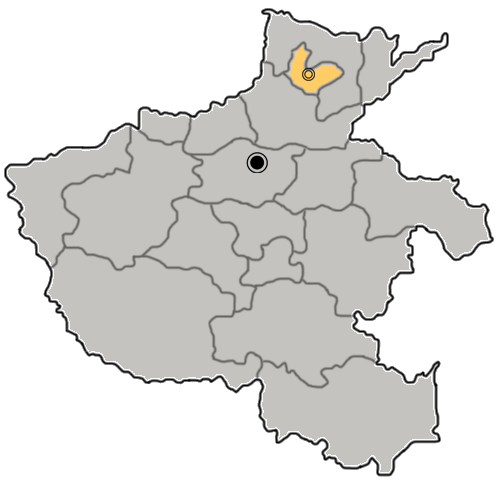
- Hebi in Henan
- Country: People's Republic of China
- Province: Henan
- Prefecture-level city: Hebi

Area
  - Total: 1,088 km^{2} (420 sq mi)

Population (2019)
  - Total: 680,700
  - Density: 625.6/km^{2} (1,620/sq mi)
- Time zone: UTC+8 (China Standard)
- Postal code: 456250
- Website: www.xunxian.gov.cn

Xun County or Xunxian (simplified Chinese: 浚县; traditional Chinese: 濬縣; pinyin: Xùn Xiàn) is a county in the north of Henan province, China. It is under the administration of the prefecture-level city of Hebi and located on the transition of the East China Plain and the Taihang Mountains.

Xun County has a historic center originating to 1331, one of the best preserved of the East China Plain, and is located along the Grand Canal.

The landscape is characterized by the hills of Dayao and Fuqiu rising from the plains.

The Yellow River historically had its course through the south of the county, causing numerous floods.

== History ==
During the Shang dynasty the area was called Li (黎). During the Western Han Dynasty it was first established as a county. In 1115 it was named Xunzhou, governing over Liyang County and Wei County. It was demoted to a county named Xun County in 1369.

== Administrative divisions ==
As of 2012, this county is divided to 7 towns and 2 townships.

Towns

- Chengguan (城关镇)
- Liyang (黎阳镇)
- Shantang (善堂镇)
- Tunzi (屯子镇)
- Weixian (卫贤镇)
- Xiaohe (小河镇)
- Xinzhen (新镇镇)

Townships

- Baisi Township (白寺乡)
- Wangzhuang Township (王庄乡)

== Climate ==
Climate data for Xunxian, elevation 58 m (190 ft), (1991–2020 normals, extremes 1981–2010)
Month	Jan	Feb	Mar	Apr	May	Jun	Jul	Aug	Sep	Oct	Nov	Dec	Year
Record high °C (°F)	17.6 (63.7)	24.6 (76.3)	27.4 (81.3)	34.9 (94.8)	38.0 (100.4)	41.4 (106.5)	41.9 (107.4)	38.0 (100.4)	37.4 (99.3)	34.4 (93.9)	27.4 (81.3)	22.3 (72.1)	41.9 (107.4)
Mean daily maximum °C (°F)	4.5 (40.1)	8.5 (47.3)	15.5 (59.9)	21.1 (70.0)	27.0 (80.6)	32.5 (90.5)	32.3 (90.1)	30.6 (87.1)	26.9 (80.4)	21.6 (70.9)	13.0 (55.4)	6.8 (44.2)	20.0 (68.0)
Daily mean °C (°F)	−1.1 (30.0)	2.6 (36.7)	9.3 (48.7)	14.9 (58.8)	21.2 (70.2)	26.2 (79.2)	27.3 (81.1)	25.7 (78.3)	21.0 (69.8)	15.5 (59.9)	7.5 (45.5)	0.9 (33.6)	14.3 (57.7)
Mean daily minimum °C (°F)	−5.7 (21.7)	−2.4 (27.7)	3.6 (38.5)	8.9 (48.0)	15.2 (59.4)	20.2 (68.4)	23.0 (73.4)	21.7 (71.1)	16.2 (61.2)	10.7 (51.3)	2.9 (37.2)	−3.9 (25.0)	9.2 (48.6)
Record low °C (°F)	−17.5 (0.5)	−14.8 (5.4)	−8.0 (17.6)	−1.1 (30.0)	5.0 (41.0)	12.0 (53.6)	17.1 (62.8)	12.3 (54.1)	6.8 (44.2)	−1.4 (29.5)	−15.1 (4.8)	−15.4 (4.3)	−17.5 (0.5)
Average precipitation mm (inches)	6.0 (0.24)	9.3 (0.37)	14.8 (0.58)	33.2 (1.31)	50.6 (1.99)	66.2 (2.61)	146.1 (5.75)	110.2 (4.34)	60.9 (2.40)	29.4 (1.16)	22.5 (0.89)	5.6 (0.22)	554.8 (21.86)
Average precipitation days (≥ 0.1 mm)	2.9	3.3	3.5	5.1	6.1	7.5	10.8	9.3	7.0	5.7	4.7	2.6	68.5
Average snowy days	3.1	2.9	1.2	0.2	0	0	0	0	0	0	1.2	2.5	11.1
Average relative humidity (%)	62	59	59	64	66	62	77	82	76	68	69	65	67
Mean monthly sunshine hours	107.5	125.5	173.7	200.6	219.8	198.9	165.5	176.0	156.3	151.0	129.1	121.7	1,925.6
Percentage possible sunshine	34	40	47	51	50	46	37	43	43	44	42	40	43
Source: China Meteorological Administration

== Notable people ==
Duanmu Ci was born in Xun County.

== Transport ==
- Huaxun railway station
