= Jinshan Temple (Fuzhou) =

Buddhist temple in Fujian, China

- 金山寺
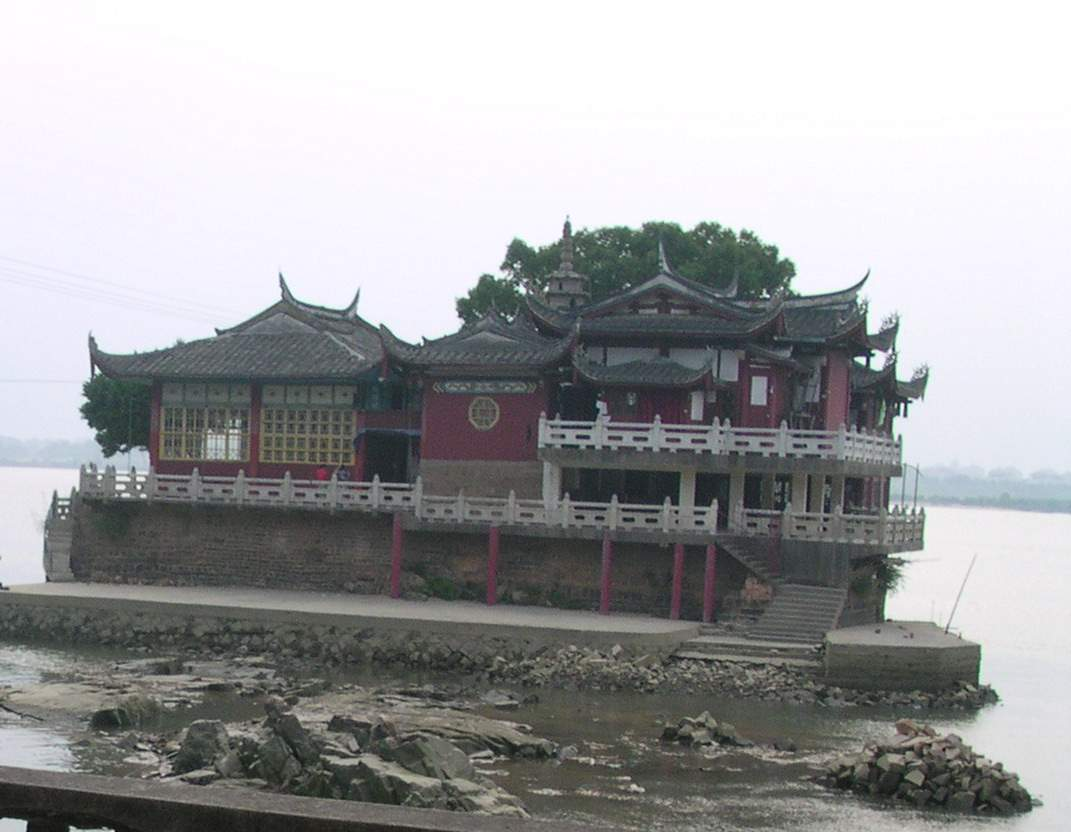
- A frontal view of Jinshan Temple

- Location within Fujian Location within China

Religion
- Affiliation: Buddhism

Location
- Location: Cangshan District, Fuzhou, Fujian
- Country: China
- Interactive map of Jinshan Temple
- Coordinates: 26°4′33″N 119°13′34″E

Architecture
- Style: Chinese architecture
- Established: Shaoxing period (1131–1162)
- Completed: 1934 (reconstruction)

Jinshan Temple (Chinese: 金山寺; pinyin: Jīnshān Sì) is a Buddhist temple located on an island of Wulongjiang River, in Cangshan District of Fuzhou, Fujian, China. It is the only Buddhist temple in the river in China and the only Buddhist temple on the water in Fujian.

== History ==
=== Song dynasty ===
The original temple dates back to the Shaoxing period (1131–1162) of the Southern Song dynasty (1127–1279).

=== Ming dynasty ===
In the Jiajing era (1522–1566) of the Ming dynasty (1368–1644), Zhang Jing lived here.

In 1615, in the reign of Wanli Emperor (1573–1620), the bridge, which connected the island and the bank, was destroyed by flood.

=== Qing dynasty ===
In 1870, in the Tongzhi period (1862–1874) of the Qing dynasty (1644–1911), Scottish photographer John Thomson visited the temple and took a lot of pictures, which published in his album Foochow and the River Min.

=== Modern China ===
The temple was restored in 1934 after damage by a series of floods.

== Architecture ==
The temple consists of five buildings: Hall of Mazu, Hall of Great Compassion, left wing-room and right wing-room, and a Song dynasty stone pagoda.

=== Hall of Mazu ===
The Hall of Mazu is the main hall in the temple enshrining statues of Mazu and Guanyin. Under the eaves is a plaque with the Chinese characters "Jinshan Temple" written by former Venerable Master of the Buddhist Association of China Zhao Puchu.

=== Stone Pagoda ===
The seven-story, 10-metre (33 ft) tall, octagonal-based Chinese pagoda is made of brick and stone is situated within the temple.

== Gallery ==
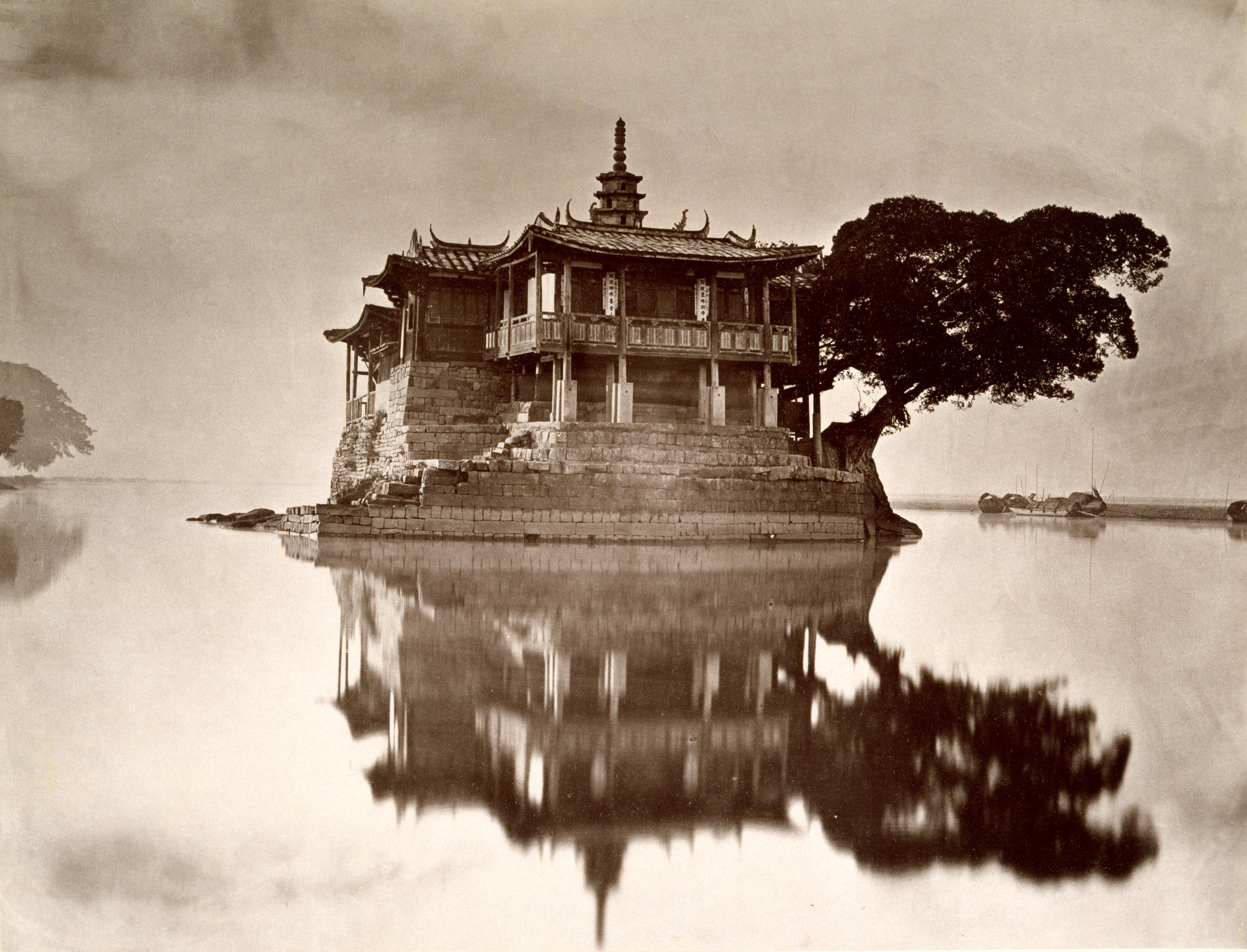
Jinshan Temple in 1871, during the Tongzhi period in the late Qing dynasty (1644–1912), photographed by John Thomson.

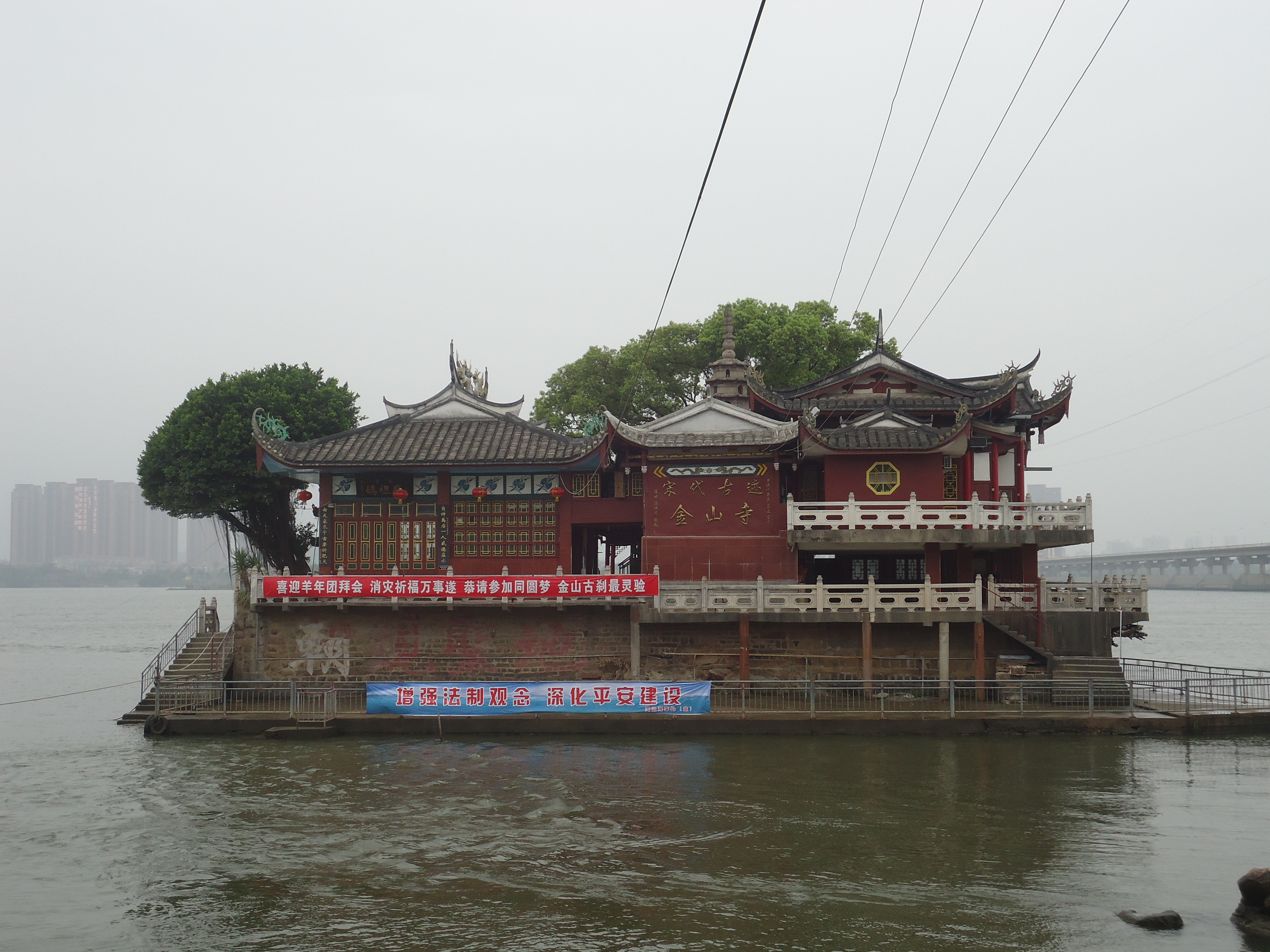
Jinshan Temple in 2015.

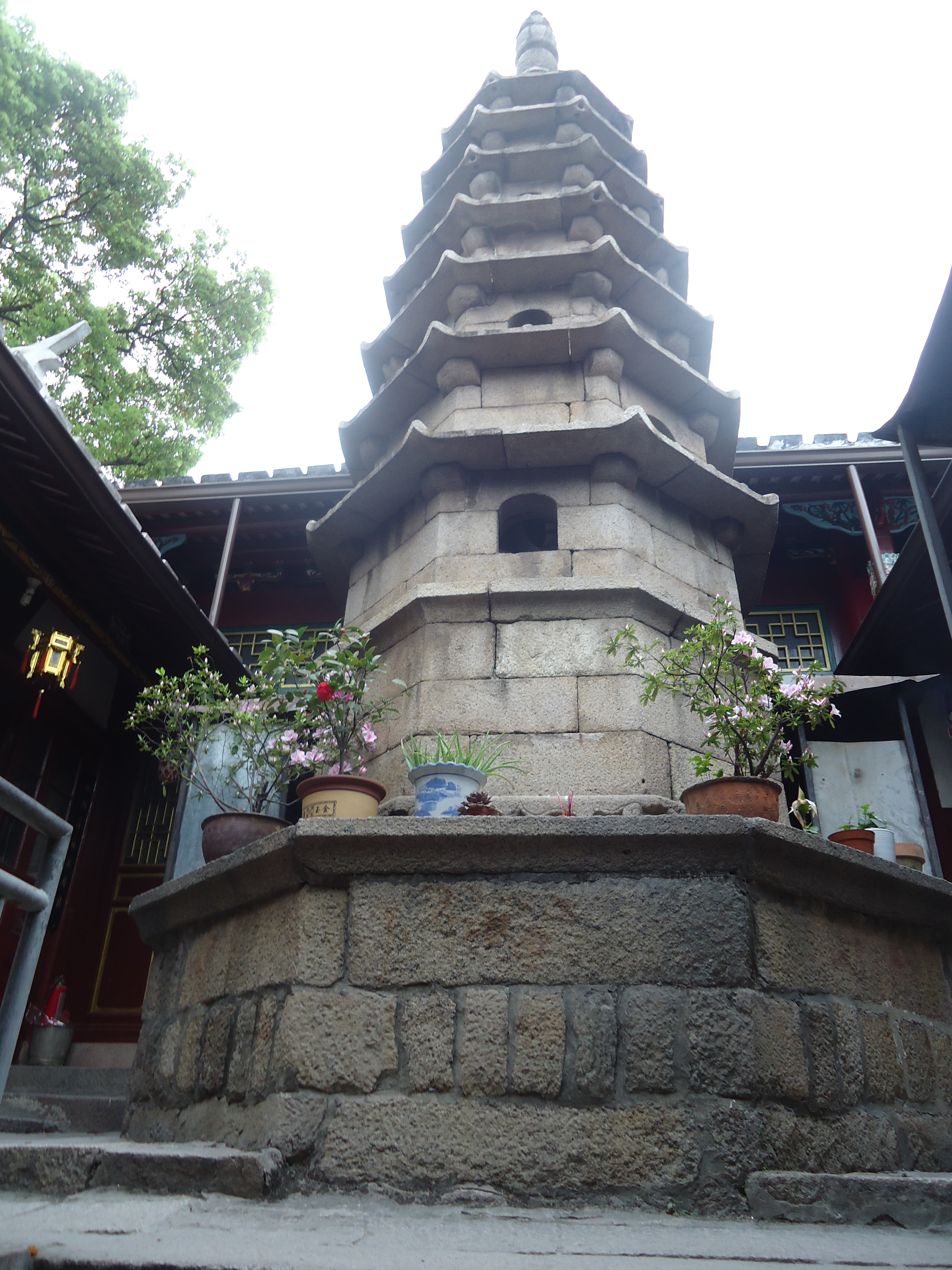
A stone pagoda at Jinshan Temple.
