= Qibin, Hebi =

Coordinates: 35°44′34″N 114°18′51″E

Qibin 淇滨区
- District
- Interactive map of Qibin
- Country: People's Republic of China
- Province: Henan
- Prefecture-level city: Hebi

Area
  - Total: 295 km^{2} (114 sq mi)

Population (2019)
  - Total: 295,000
  - Density: 1,000/km^{2} (2,590/sq mi)
- Time zone: UTC+8 (China Standard)
- Postal code: 458030

Qibin District (simplified Chinese: 淇滨; traditional Chinese: 淇濱; pinyin: Qíbīn) is a district of the city of Hebi, Henan province, China.

== Administrative divisions ==
Longzihu District is divided to 1 subdistrict, 2 towns, 2 townships and 1 other.

Subdistricts

- Jinshan Subdistrict (金山街道)

Towns

- Dalaidian (大赉店镇)
- Jiuqiao (钜桥镇)

Townships

- Dahejian Township (大河涧乡)
- Shangyu Township (上峪乡)

Others

- Qibin Economic and Technological Development Zone (淇滨经济技术开发区)
