= Hebi =

Hebi 鹤壁市 Hopi
- Prefecture-level city
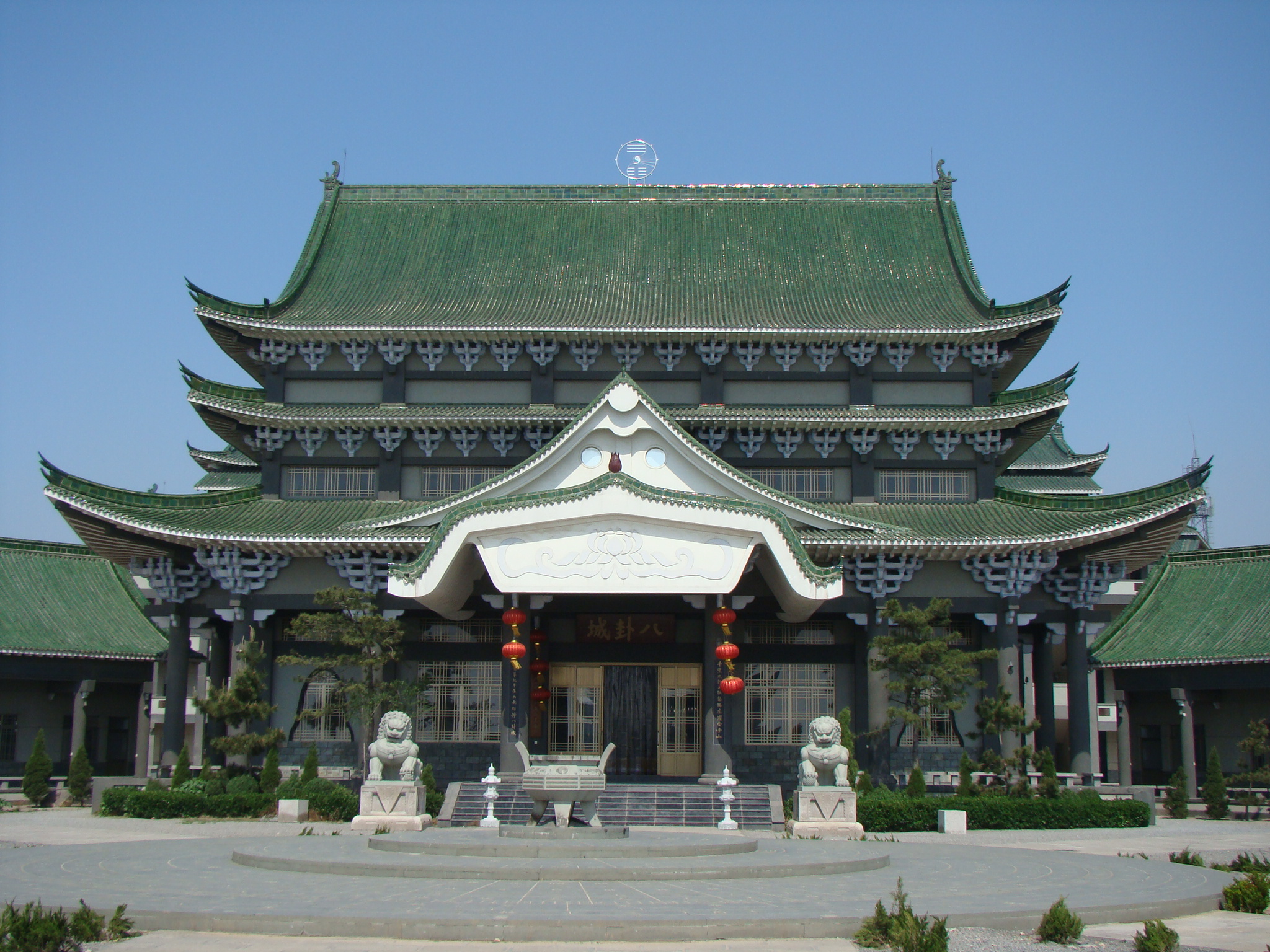
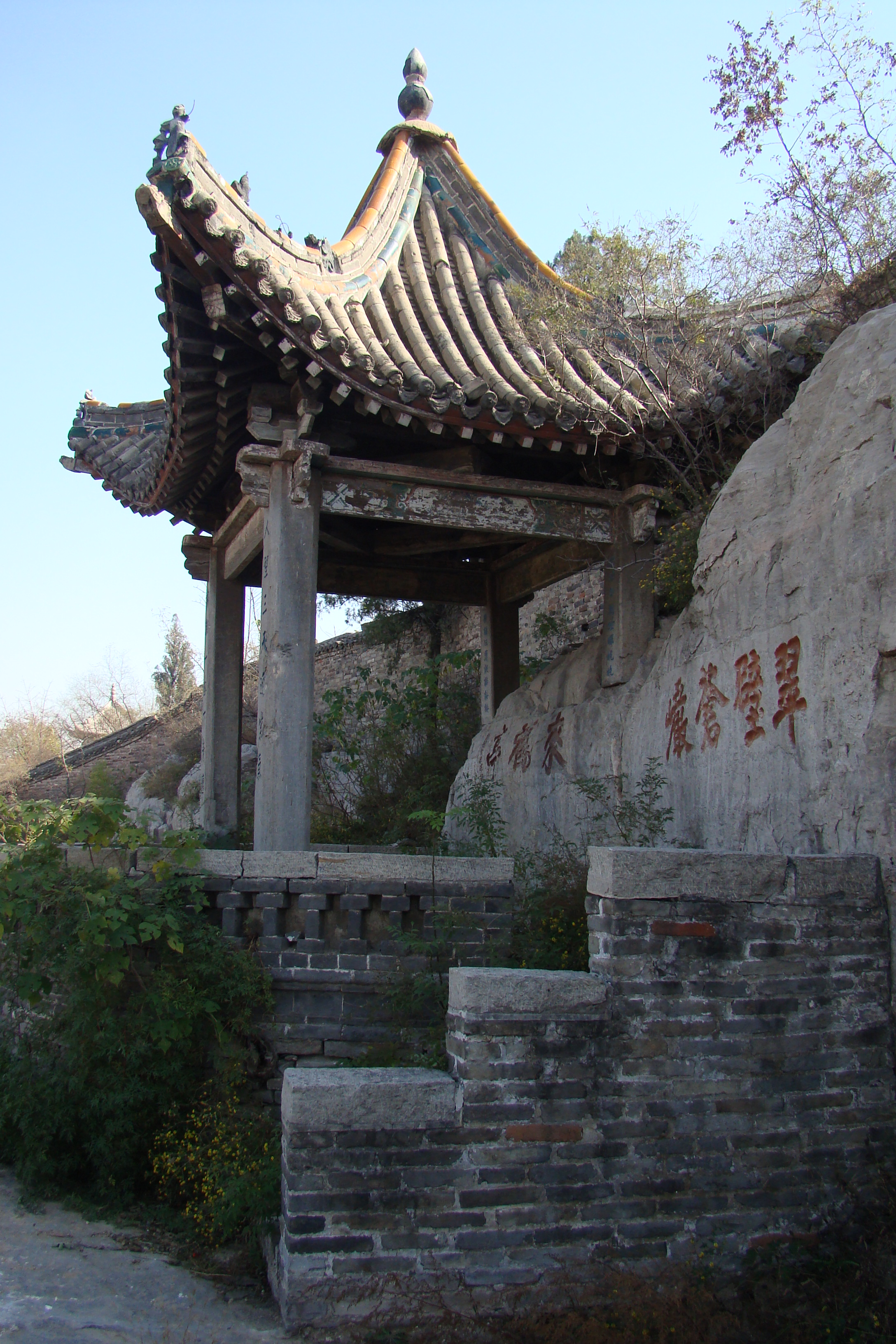
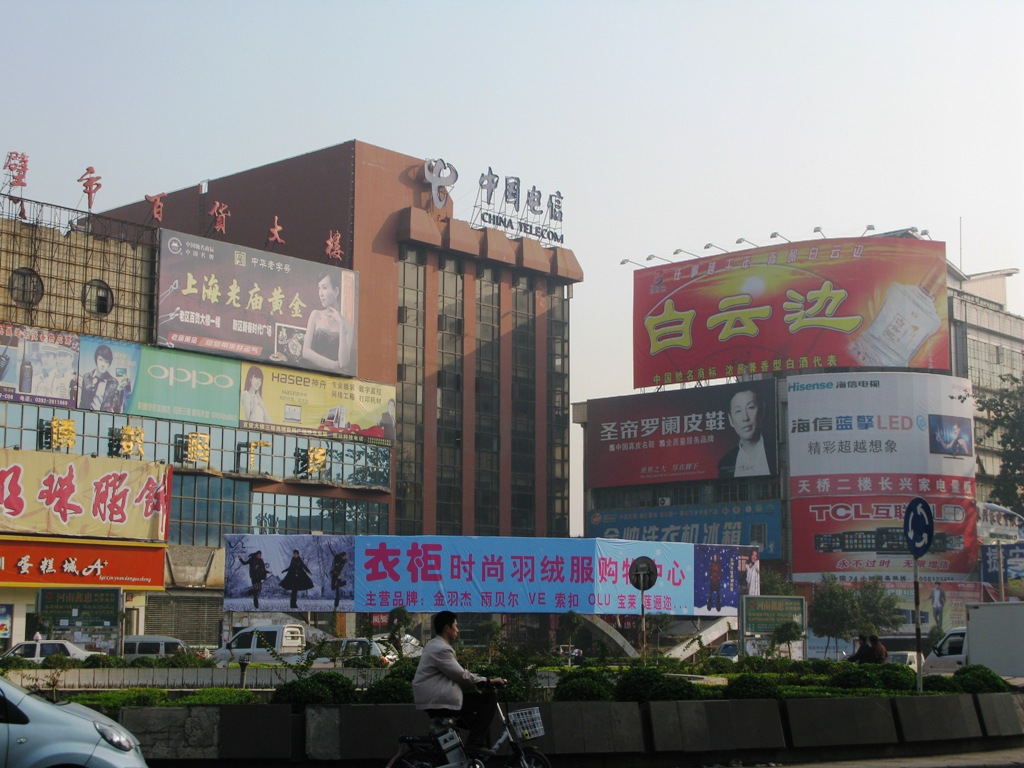
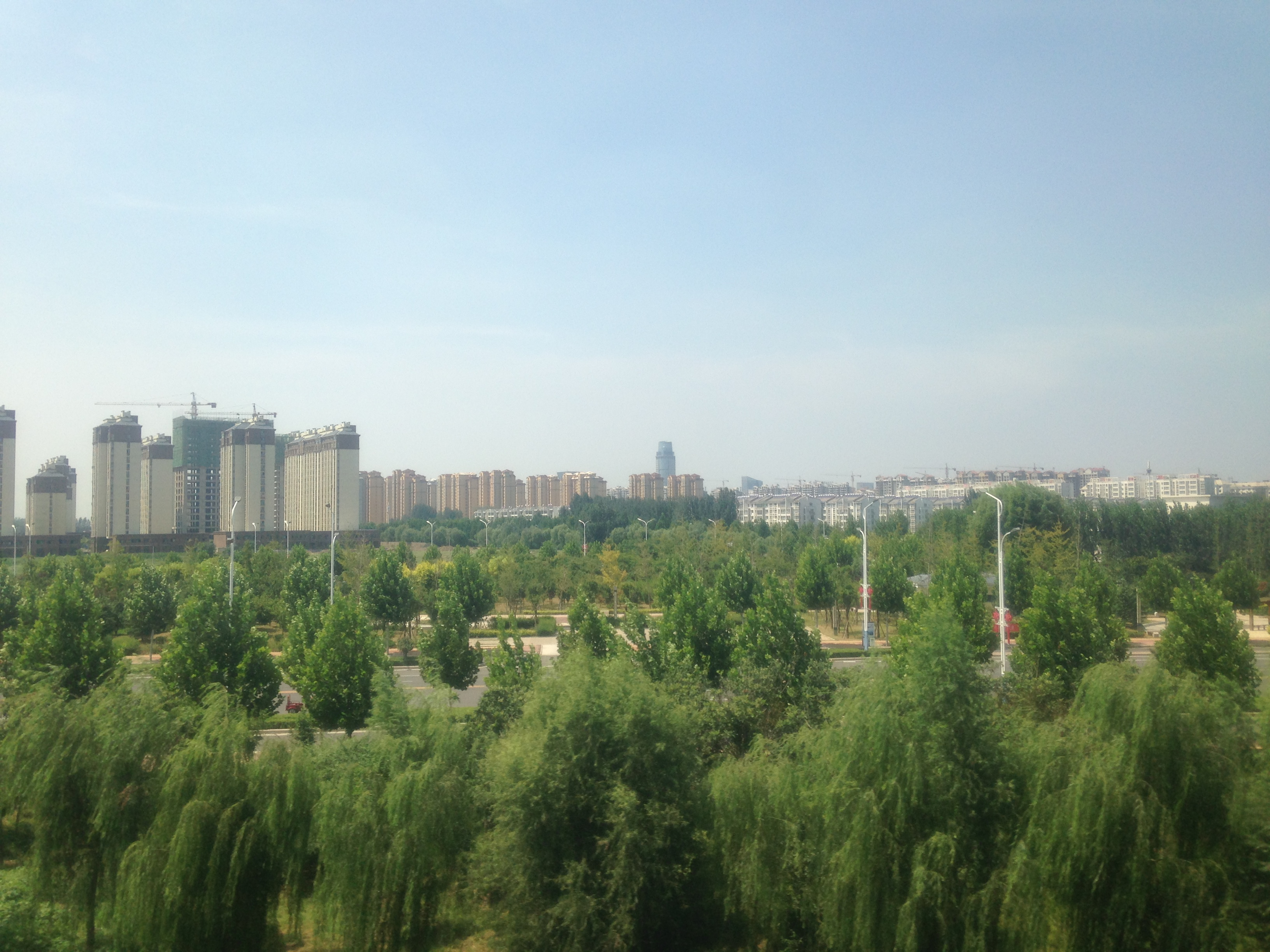
- Temple of the Eight Symbols in Qi County Pagoda in Xun County Shancheng District Department Store View near Hebi East railway station

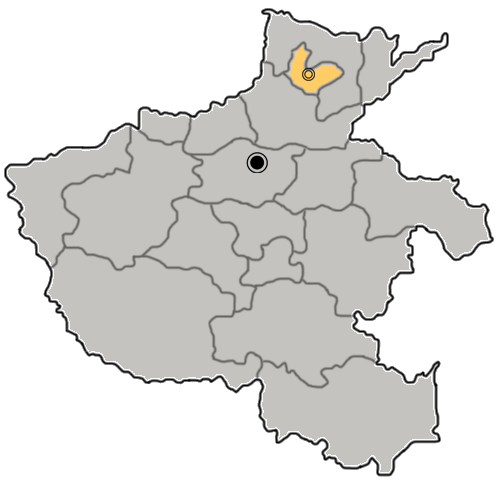
- Location of Hebi in Henan
- Interactive map of Hebi
- Location in the North China Plain Hebi (China)
- Coordinates (Hebi municipal government): 35°44′53″N 114°17′49″E
- Country: People's Republic of China
- Province: Henan
- Municipal seat: Qibin District

Area
  - Prefecture-level city: 2,299 km^{2} (888 sq mi)
  - Urban (2018): 543 km^{2} (210 sq mi)
  - Metro: 847.3 km^{2} (327.1 sq mi)

Population (2020 census for total, 2018 otherwise)
  - Prefecture-level city: 1,565,973
  - Density: 681.2/km^{2} (1,764/sq mi)
  - Urban (2018): 667,600
  - Urban density: 1,230/km^{2} (3,180/sq mi)
  - Metro: 574,000
  - Metro density: 677/km^{2} (1,750/sq mi)

GDP
  - Prefecture-level city: CN¥ 77.2 billion US$ 11.6 billion
  - Per capita: CN¥ 47,940; US$ 7,217
- Time zone: UTC+8 (China Standard)
- Area code: 392
- ISO 3166 code: CN-HA-06
- Major Nationalities: Han
- County-level divisions: 5
- Township-level divisions: unknown
- License plate prefixes: 豫F
- Website: hebi.gov.cn

Hebi (simplified Chinese: 鹤壁; traditional Chinese: 鶴壁; pinyin: Hèbì [xɤ̂.pî]; postal: Hopi) is a prefecture-level city in northern Henan province, China. Situated in mountainous terrain at the edge of the Shanxi plateau, Hebi is about 25 miles (40 km) south of Anyang, 40 miles (64 km) northeast of Xinxiang and 65 miles (105 km) north of Kaifeng.

As of the 2020 census, its population was 1,565,973 inhabitants and in the 2018 estimate 574,000 lived in the built-up (or metro) area made of Qibin District and Qi County largely conurbated. One can notice that Shancheng District and Heshan District are for the moment, part of another built-up area of 372,600 inhabitants close to Anyang.

Hebi has several coal mines. The city is also home to the Hebi New Area, an economic development zone.

== Administration ==
The prefecture-level city of Hebi administers 3 districts and 2 counties.

- Qibin District (淇滨区)
- Shancheng District (山城区)
- Heshan District (鹤山区)
- Xun County (浚县)
- Qi County (淇县)

Map
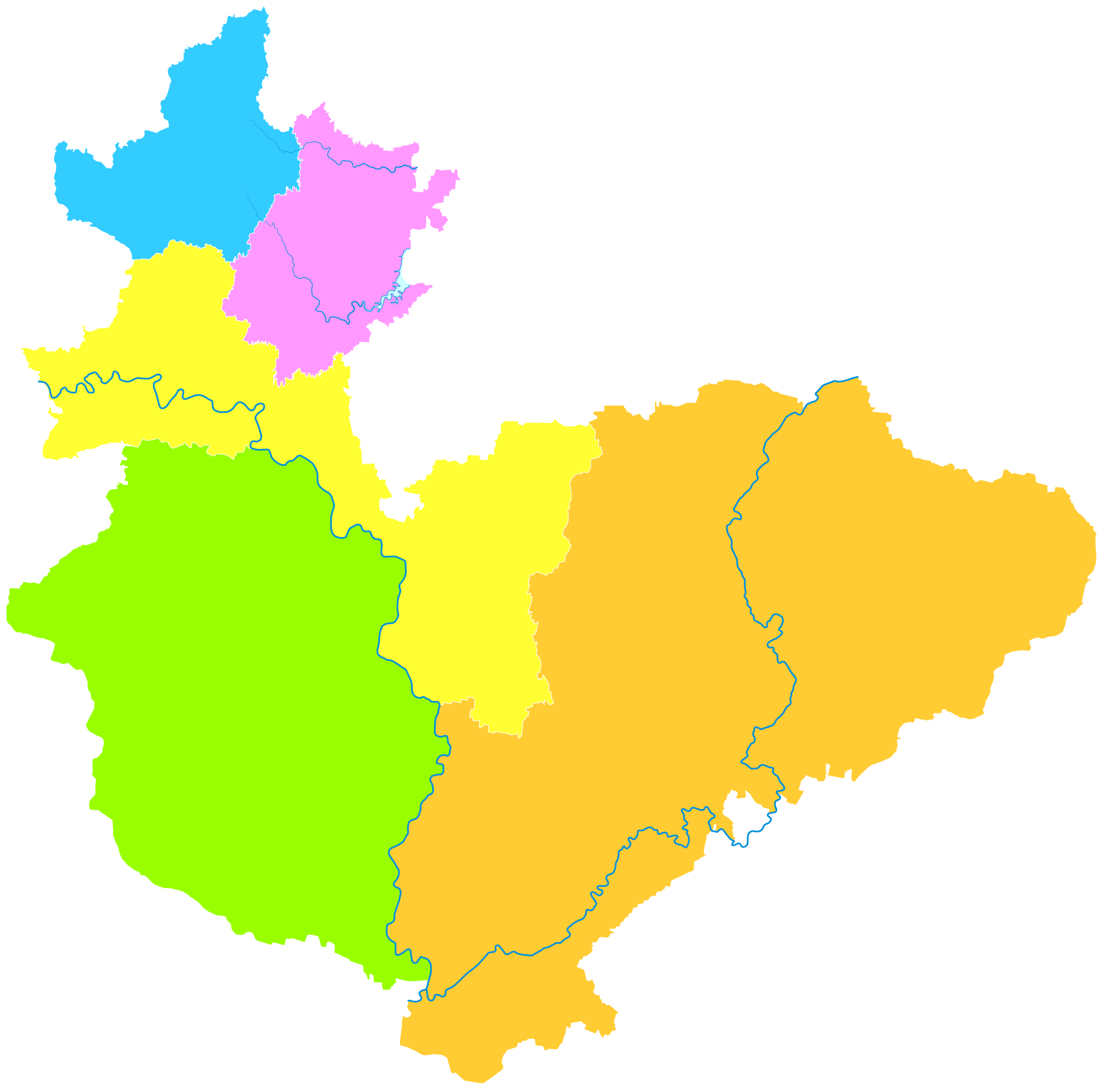

== Climate ==
Climate data for Hebi, elevation 80 m (260 ft), (1991–2020 normals)
Month	Jan	Feb	Mar	Apr	May	Jun	Jul	Aug	Sep	Oct	Nov	Dec	Year
Mean daily maximum °C (°F)	4.3 (39.7)	8.0 (46.4)	15.2 (59.4)	20.7 (69.3)	27.0 (80.6)	32.7 (90.9)	32.5 (90.5)	30.5 (86.9)	27.0 (80.6)	21.3 (70.3)	13.1 (55.6)	6.7 (44.1)	19.9 (67.9)
Daily mean °C (°F)	−1.4 (29.5)	1.8 (35.2)	8.7 (47.7)	14.5 (58.1)	20.9 (69.6)	26.2 (79.2)	27.3 (81.1)	25.6 (78.1)	20.7 (69.3)	15.1 (59.2)	7.5 (45.5)	0.5 (32.9)	13.9 (57.1)
Mean daily minimum °C (°F)	−6.0 (21.2)	−3.1 (26.4)	2.7 (36.9)	8.4 (47.1)	14.7 (58.5)	20.1 (68.2)	23.0 (73.4)	21.6 (70.9)	15.8 (60.4)	10.2 (50.4)	2.9 (37.2)	−4.2 (24.4)	8.8 (47.9)
Average precipitation mm (inches)	6.1 (0.24)	8.2 (0.32)	5.9 (0.23)	42.3 (1.67)	36.8 (1.45)	65.1 (2.56)	155.1 (6.11)	133.9 (5.27)	64.3 (2.53)	24.2 (0.95)	23.4 (0.92)	3.4 (0.13)	568.7 (22.38)
Average precipitation days (≥ 0.1 mm)	2.3	2.3	2.7	5.8	6.4	7.0	10.3	9.9	7.6	5.7	5.7	1.4	67.1
Average relative humidity (%)	62	60	59	67	66	59	76	82	78	69	70	65	68
Source: China Meteorological Administration

== History ==
The name of "Hebi" first appears in the History of Jin. It is believed that during ancient times, cranes would rest on the cliffs of the southern mountains. The southern mountain was then named 鹤山 (Heshan), where 鹤 means crane. The village near the southern mountain was then named 鹤壁 (Hebi), which literally translates to "Cranes resting on cliffs").

=== Relocation of the Urban Area of Hebi ===
The urban area of Hebi has undergone three relocations. In 1957, the urban area was selected to be in Hebiji. With the construction of the mine #2 and mine #3, the urban area moved south to what is now known as Zhongshan District in December 1957. Later in 1959, the urban area changed from Zhongshan District to another district that is known as Dahu. However, the surrounding areas of the urban area became mostly subsidence areas, restricting further development of the city. Therefore, in 1992, Hebi government established Qibin Economic Development Zone at the junction of Qi County, Junxian County in the southeast. As the scale of the Qibin Economic Development Zone expands, the political center of the city also moved to Qibin District in May 1999. Qibin District is now the new political, economic center of Hebi City.
