= Lüboyuan railway station =

Railway station in Zhengzhou, China

Lüboyuan 绿博园
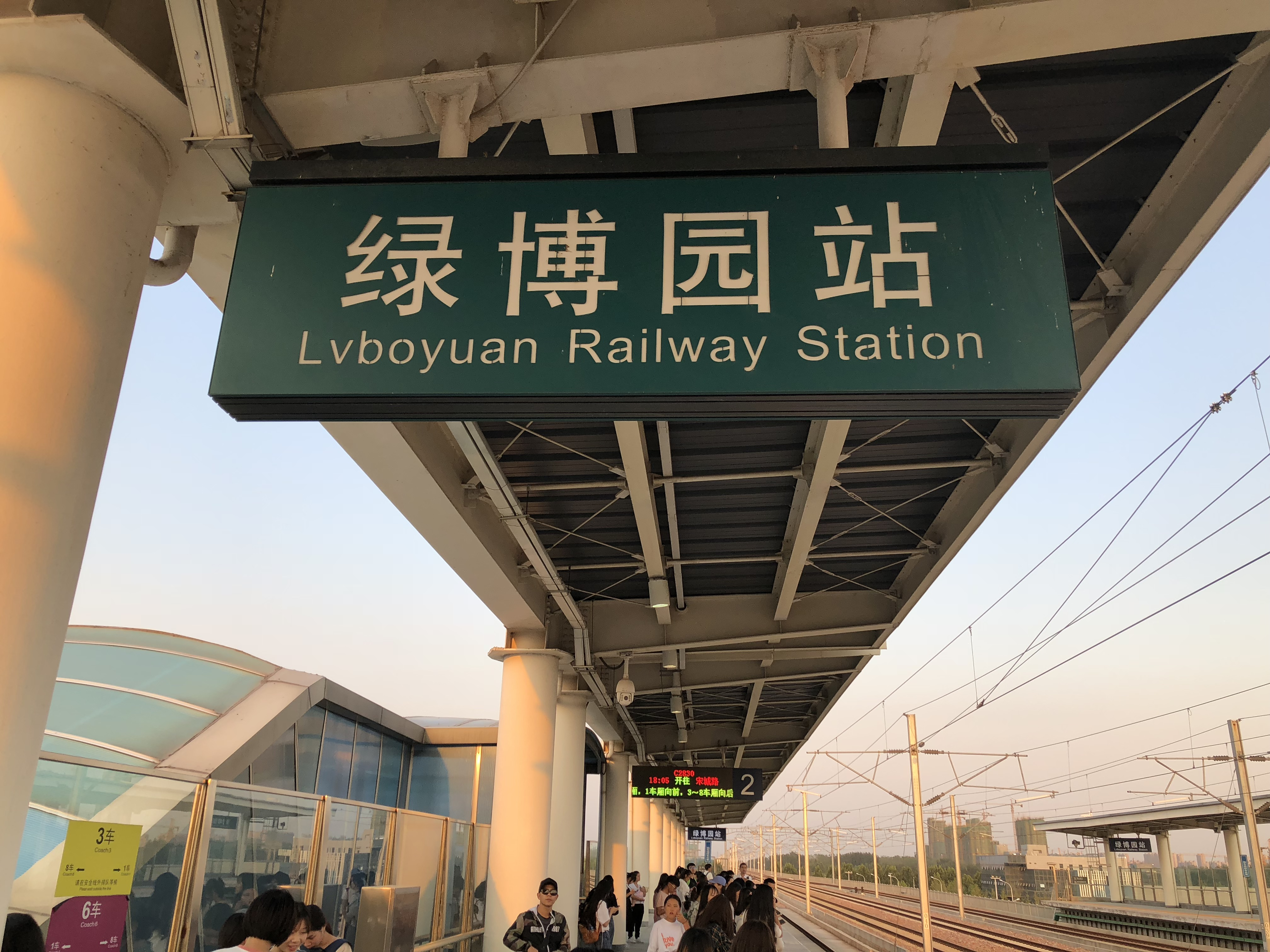

General information
- Location: Zhongmu County, Zhengzhou, Henan; China
- Coordinates: 34.7804°N 113.9336°E
- Operator: CR Zhengzhou
- Line: Zhengzhou–Kaifeng intercity railway
- Platforms: 2
- Tracks: 4
- Connections: Bus

Construction
- Structure type: Elevated

Other information
- Status: Operational
- Station code: LCF (telegraph code); LBY (Pinyin code)

History
- Opened: 28 December 2014
Location
- Location within Zhengzhou Location within Henan

Lüboyuan railway station (Chinese: 绿博园站; pinyin: Lǜbóyuán zhàn; lit. 'Green Expo Garden station') is a railway station on the Zhengzhou–Kaifeng intercity railway. The station is 2 km north of the Green Expo Garden in Zhongmu County, Zhengzhou, Henan, China.

== History ==
The station was opened on 28 December 2014, together with the railway.

On 10 January 2016, after the closure of Jialuhe station and Yunlianghe station, the station became the only operational intermediate station of the Zhengzhou–Kaifeng intercity railway.

== Station layout ==
The station is an elevated train station. The ground level is for ticket offices and waiting rooms and platforms and tracks are on the second floor. The station has two side platforms and four tracks. The two tracks in the middle are through tracks for non-stop trains. The northern platform is for trains towards Songchenglu and the southern platform is for trains towards Zhengzhou East.

Preceding station	China Railway High-speed	Following station
Jialuhe towards Zhengzhou East	Zhengzhou–Kaifeng intercity railway	Yunlianghe towards Songchenglu
