= Yunlianghe railway station =

Railway station in Kaifeng, China

Yunlianghe 运粮河
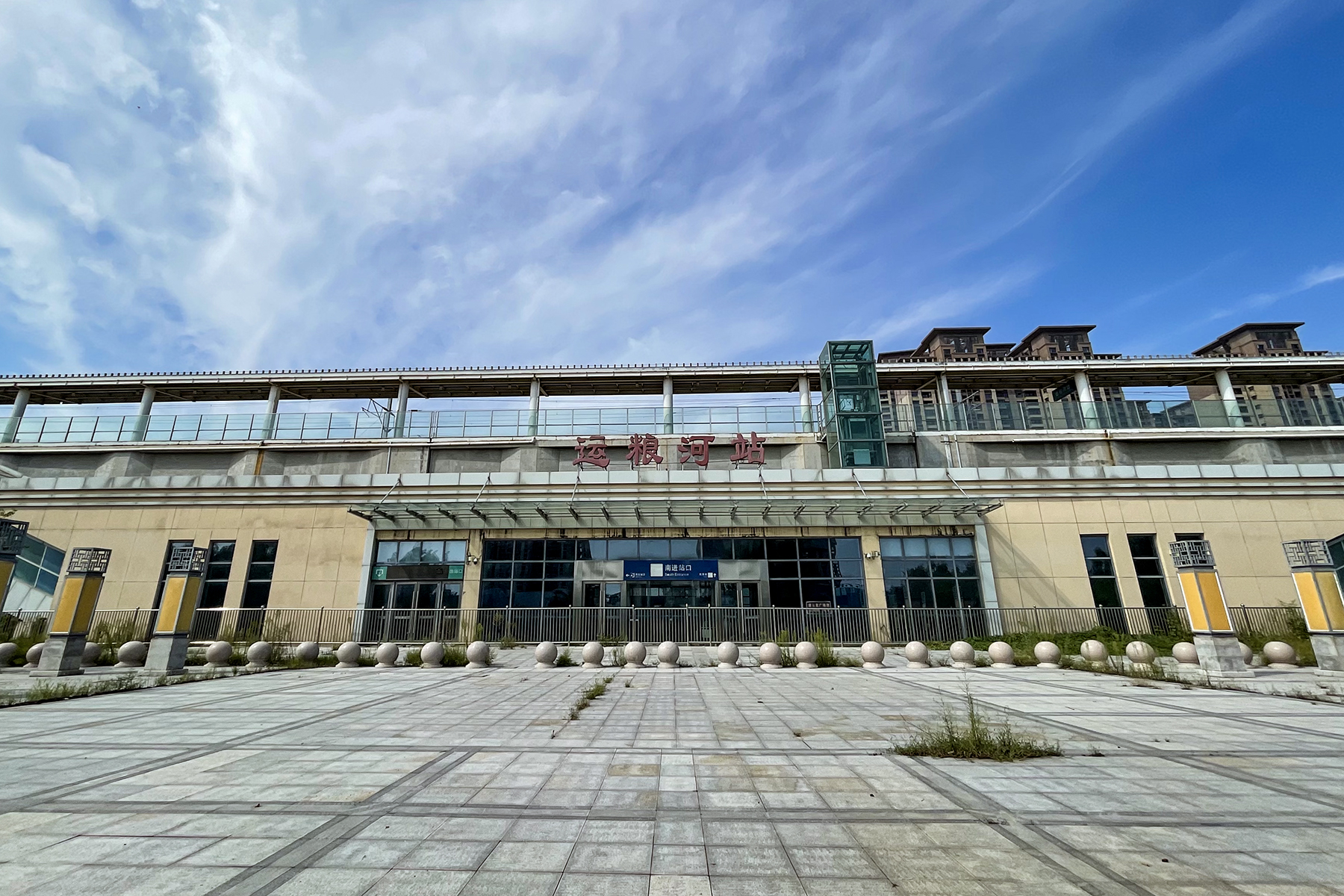

General information
- Location: Longting District, Kaifeng, Henan; China
- Coordinates: 34.7961°N 114.1963°E
- Operator: CR Zhengzhou
- Line: Zhengzhou–Kaifeng intercity railway
- Platforms: 2
- Tracks: 4

Construction
- Structure type: Elevated

History
- Opened: 28 December 2014
- Closed: 10 January 2016

Services
Preceding station	China Railway High-speed	Following station
Lüboyuan towards Zhengzhou East	Zhengzhou–Kaifeng intercity railway	Songchenglu Terminus
Location

Yunlianghe railway station (Chinese: 运粮河站) is a railway station on the Zhengzhou–Kaifeng intercity railway in Kaifeng, Henan, China.

On 10 January 2016, the station was closed due to lack of passengers.
