= Jialuhe railway station =

Railway station in Zhengzhou, China

Jialuhe 贾鲁河
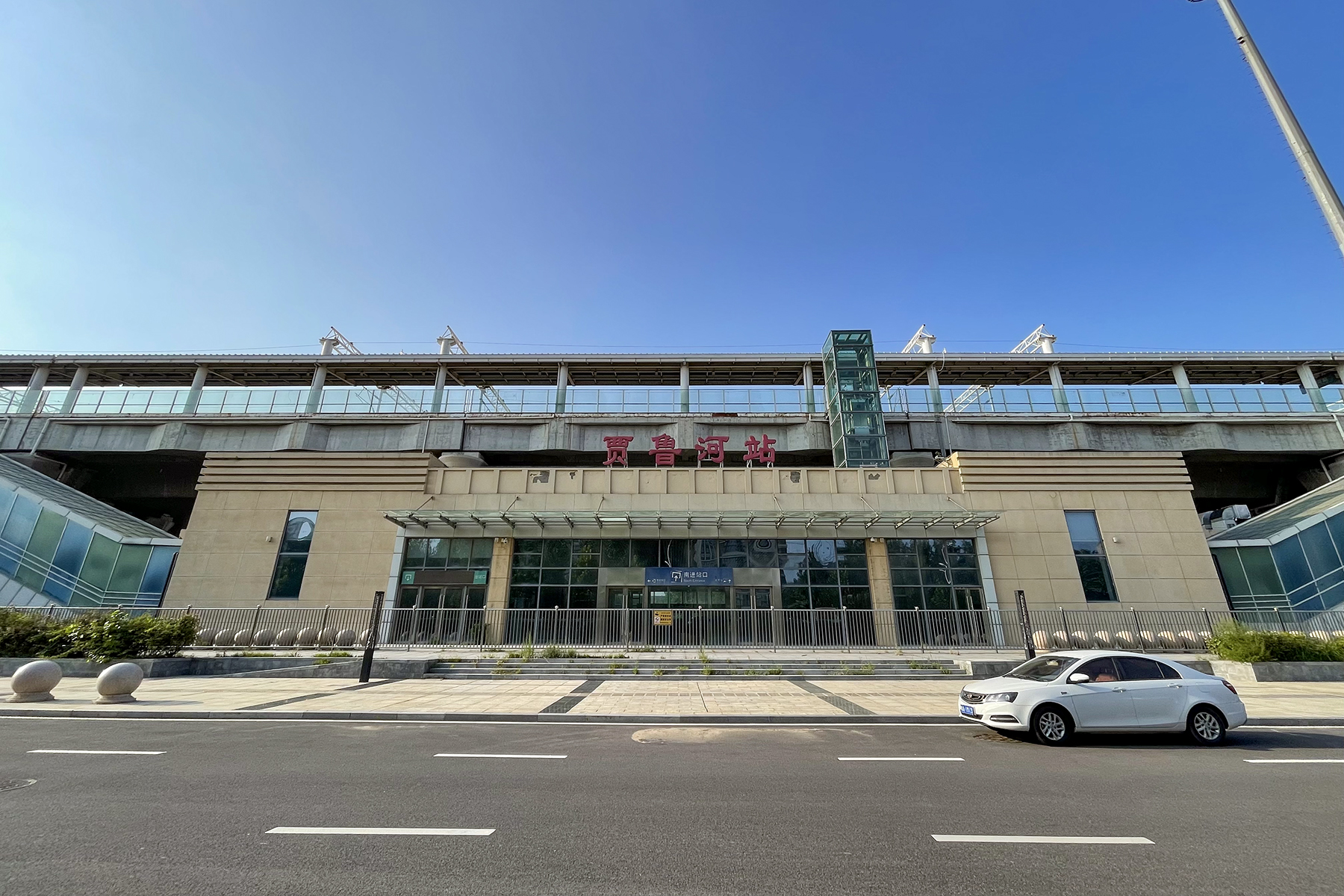

General information
- Location: Zhengkai Avenue × Zhengxin Road; Zhongmu County, Zhengzhou, Henan; China
- Coordinates: 34.7751°N 113.8496°E
- Operator: CR Zhengzhou
- Line: Zhengzhou–Kaifeng intercity railway
- Platforms: 2
- Tracks: 2
- Connections: Bus

Construction
- Structure type: Elevated

Other information
- Status: Closed

History
- Opened: 28 December 2014
- Closed: 10 January 2016
- Former names: Zhengxinlu (Chinese: 郑信路)
Location
- Location within Zhengzhou Location within Henan

Jialuhe railway station (Chinese: 贾鲁河站) is a closed station on the Zhengzhou–Kaifeng intercity railway. The station is located at the crossing of Zhengkai Avenue and Zhengxin Road, Zhengzhou, Henan, China.

== History ==
The station was originally named Zhengxinlu Station (Chinese: 郑信路站). It was changed to the current name prior to its opening along with the Zhengzhou–Kaifeng Intercity Railway in December 2014.

On 10 January 2016, the station was closed due to lack of passengers.

== Station layout ==
The station is an elevated train station located at the southwest corner of the crossing of Zhengkai Avenue and Zhengxin Road. The ticket offices and waiting rooms are on the ground level, beneath the platforms and tracks, which are on the second floor. The station has two side platforms and two tracks. The northern platform is for trains towards Songchenglu and the southern platform is for trains towards Zhengzhou East.

Preceding station	China Railway High-speed	Following station
Zhengzhou East Terminus	Zhengzhou–Kaifeng intercity railway	Lüboyuan towards Songchenglu
