= Beijing–Hong Kong high-speed train =

High-speed train service in China and Hong Kong

Beijing–Hong Kong high-speed train 京港高速动车组列车 京港高速動車組列車

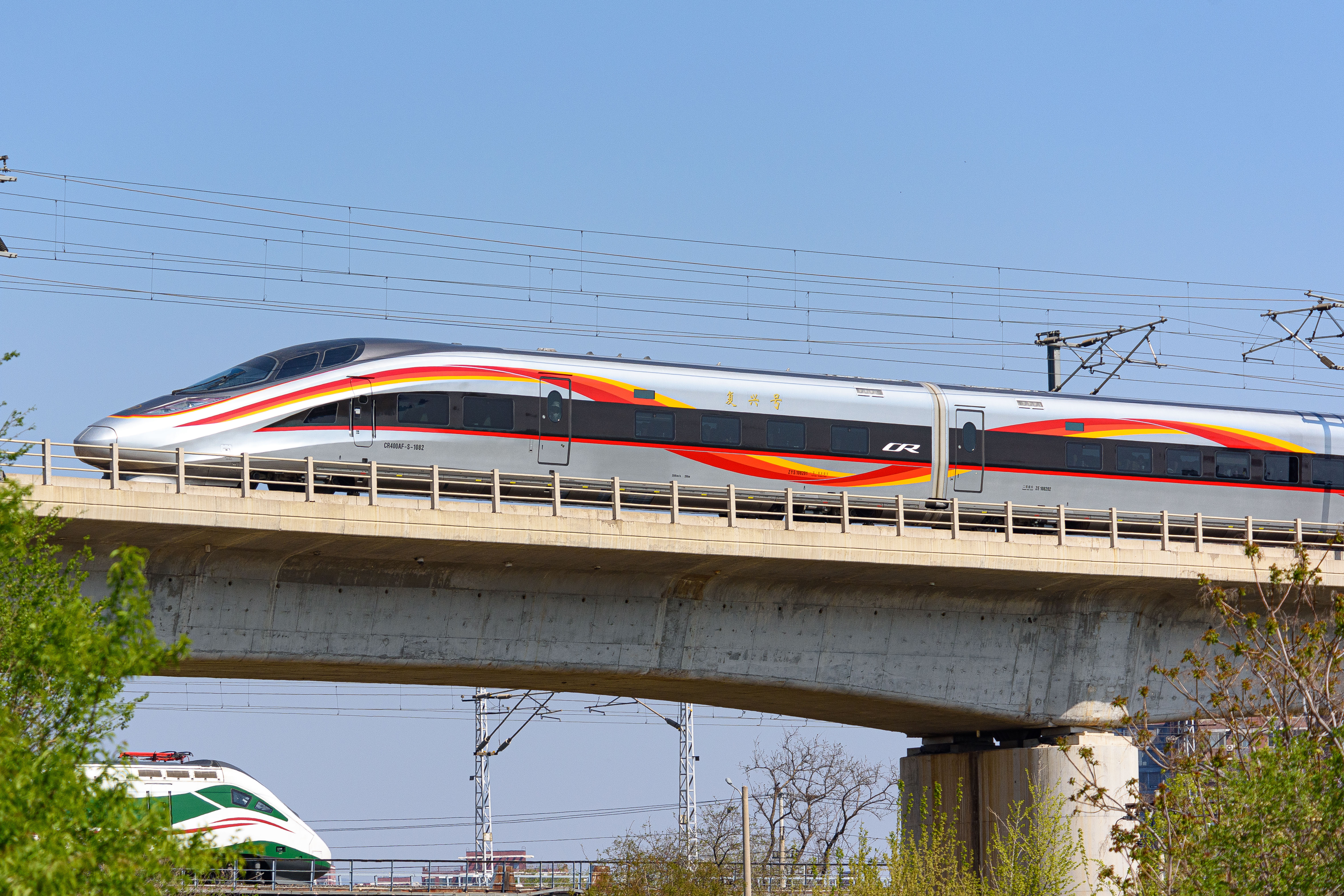
- A CR400AF-S EMU on G303 service in Shijingshan District, Beijing

Overview
- Service type: G-series trains
- Status: Operational
- Locale: China
- First service: 26 December 2012 (Beijing West ↔ Guangzhou South); 28 December 2013 (Beijing West ↔ Shenzhen North); 5 January 2017 (Beijing West ↔ Futian); 23 September 2018 (Beijing West ↔ Hong Kong West Kowloon)
- Current operator: CR Guangzhou

Route
- Termini: Beijing West; Hong Kong West Kowloon
- Stops: Shijiazhuang; Zhengzhou East; Wuhan; Changsha South; Guangzhou South; Shenzhen North
- Distance travelled: 2,439 kilometres (1,516 mi)
- Average journey time: 8h 12m (G303); 8h 10m (G304)
- Service frequency: Daily
- Train numbers: G79 (Beijing West → Hong Kong West Kowloon); G80 (Hong Kong West Kowloon → Beijing West)
- Lines used: Jingguang HSR; Guangshengang XRL

On-board services
- Classes: Business class seat; First class seat; Second class seat
- Catering facilities: Dining car; Trolley refreshment service

Technical
- Rolling stock: CR400AF-S (double-headed)
- Track gauge: 1,435 mm (4 ft 8 1/2 in)
- Operating speed: 350 km/h (217 mph)
- Track owner: China Railway

The Beijing–Hong Kong high-speed train (simplified Chinese: 京港高速动车组列车; traditional Chinese: 京港高速動車組列車) is a high-speed train service operated by China Railway Guangzhou Group (CR Guangzhou) on Beijing–Guangzhou–Shenzhen–Hong Kong HSR in China. Operated with G303/304 train numbers between Beijing West and Hong Kong West Kowloon on a daily basis, it is currently the fastest train service between Beijing and Hong Kong, with an approximate travelling time of 8 hours and 10 minutes.

== History ==
The G303/304 service dates back to 26 December 2012 as number G79/80, when the Beijing–Zhengzhou section of the Beijing–Guangzhou–Shenzhen–Hong Kong HSR was opened. At its opening, the service was between Beijing West and Guangzhou South under the numbers G79/82. Later on 28 December 2013, the southern terminus of the service was extended to Shenzhen North and the number of the Shenzhen-bound service was changed from G82 to G80.

On 5 January 2017, the service was extended to Futian.

With the inauguration of the Guangzhou–Shenzhen–Hong Kong XRL Hong Kong section on 23 September 2018, the southern terminus of the service was again extended to Hong Kong West Kowloon, while Futian was removed from the service.

On 30 January 2020 the service to West Kowloon was suspended due to the COVID-19 pandemic.

On 28 March 2020, the service was restored between Beijing West and Shenzhen North, but service to West Kowloon station was still suspended.

On 1 April 2023, services to West Kowloon station were restored.

On 15 June 2024, the maximum speed of the Beijing–Guangzhou high speed rail (Wuguang section) was increased from 310km/h to 350km/h, reducing the journey time by 46 minutes from Hong Kong to Beijing.

On 26 January 2026, the train number was renamed to G303/304.

== Operations ==
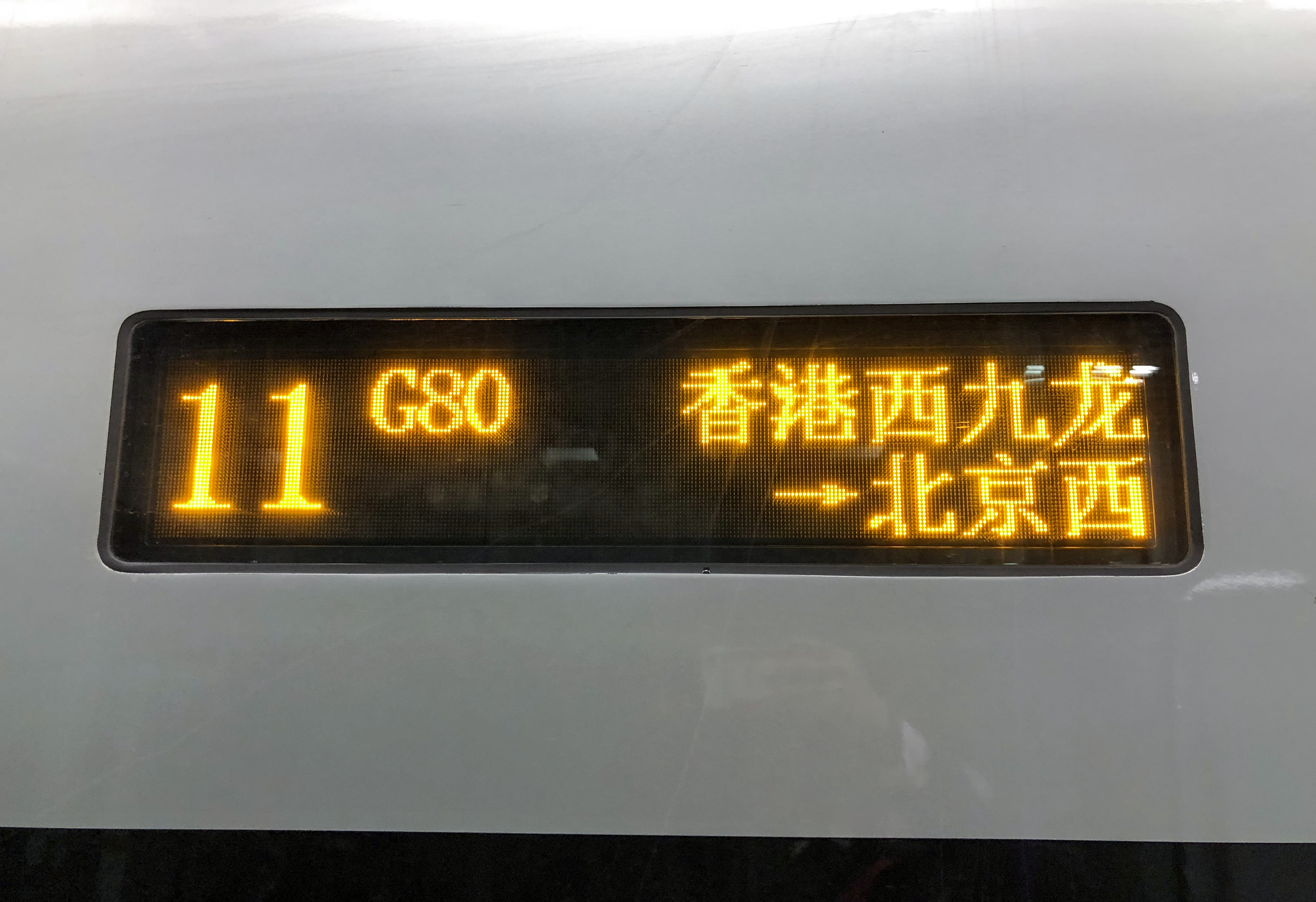

The service operates on a daily basis under the following timetable:

Effective from 26 January 2026
G303		Stops	G304	
Arrive	Depart	Stops	Arrive	Depart
—	10:00	Beijing West	19:30	—
11:00	11:02	Shijiazhuang	18:27	18:29
12:18	12:21	Zhengzhou East	17:08	17:11
13:55	13:59	Wuhan	15:31	15:34
15:10	15:13	Changsha South	14:16	14:19
17:16	17:21	Guangzhou South	12:10	12:13
17:50	17:54	Shenzhen North	11:38	11:41
18:12	—	Hong Kong West Kowloon	—	11:20

== Train formation ==
The service was operated by 16-car CR400AF-A trainsets with the formation shown below. Car 3-14 are for second class seats with 3+2 seating. The dining car is located in Car 9 and wheelchair space is provided on Car 8. Car 2 and 15 are first class car with 2+2 seating. Car 1 is for business seats only and Car 16 is a hybrid of first class seats and business seats.

Car No.	1	2	3-7	8	9	10-14	15	16
Type	SW; Business	ZY; First class	ZE; Second class	ZE; Second class	ZEC; Second class/dining car	ZE; Second class	ZY; First class	ZYS; Business/first class
Seating capacity	17	60	90	75	48	90	60	28 + 5

From 1 April 2023, all trains were replaced by the newer China Railway CR400BF-Z(Base in Guangzhou South Depot). However, from 15 June 2024, they were again replaced by the double-headed CR400AF-Z(Base in Shenzhen Depot) to enable quiet cars on this route.

=== Previously used rolling stocks ===
- 16-car CRH380BL (from 26 December 2012 to early 2016)
- 16-car CRH380AL (from early 2016 to October 2017)
- Double-headed 8-car CR400AF (from October 2017 to June 2018)
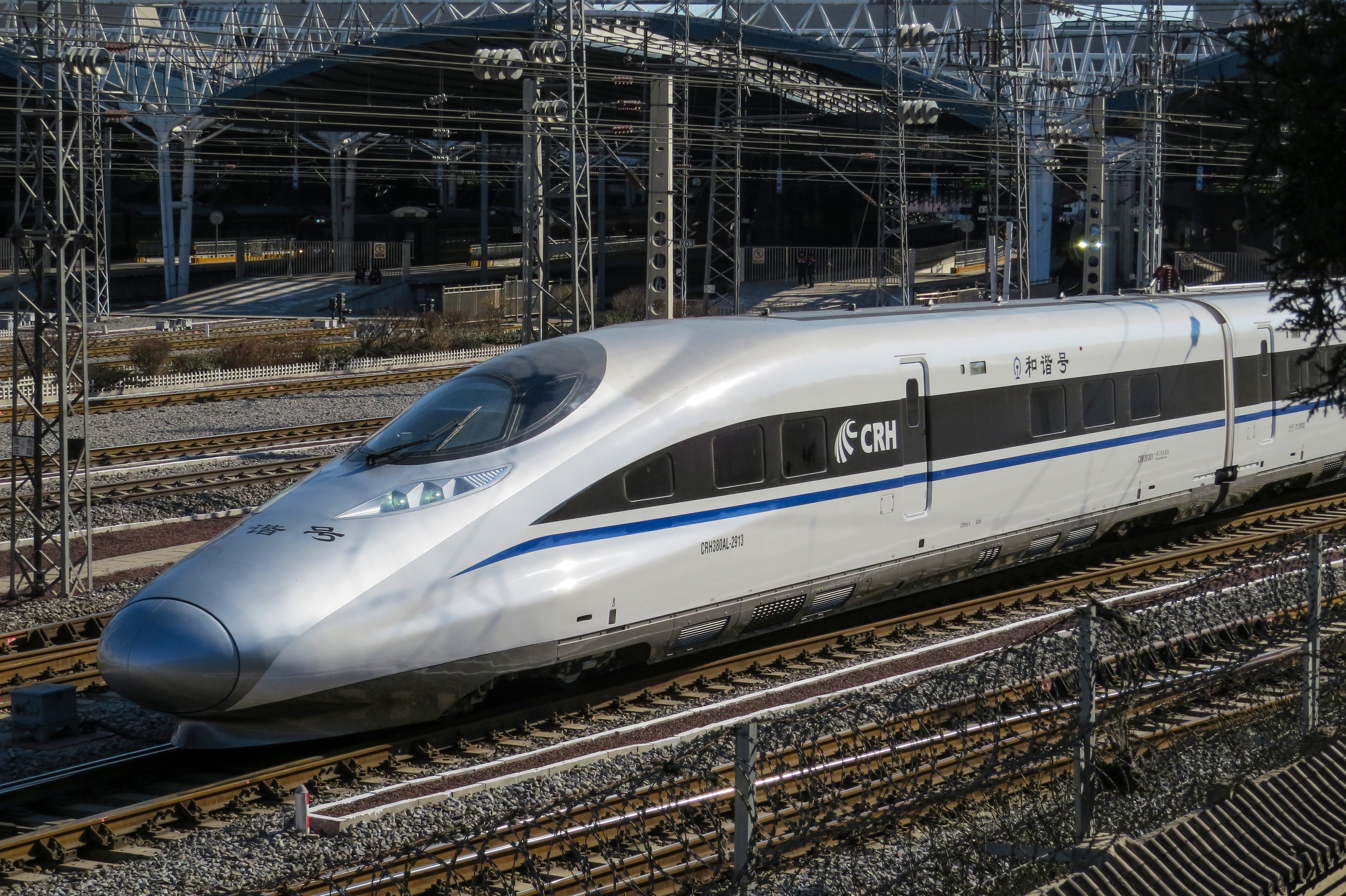
A CRH380AL on G79 service leaving Beijing West in Feb. 2017

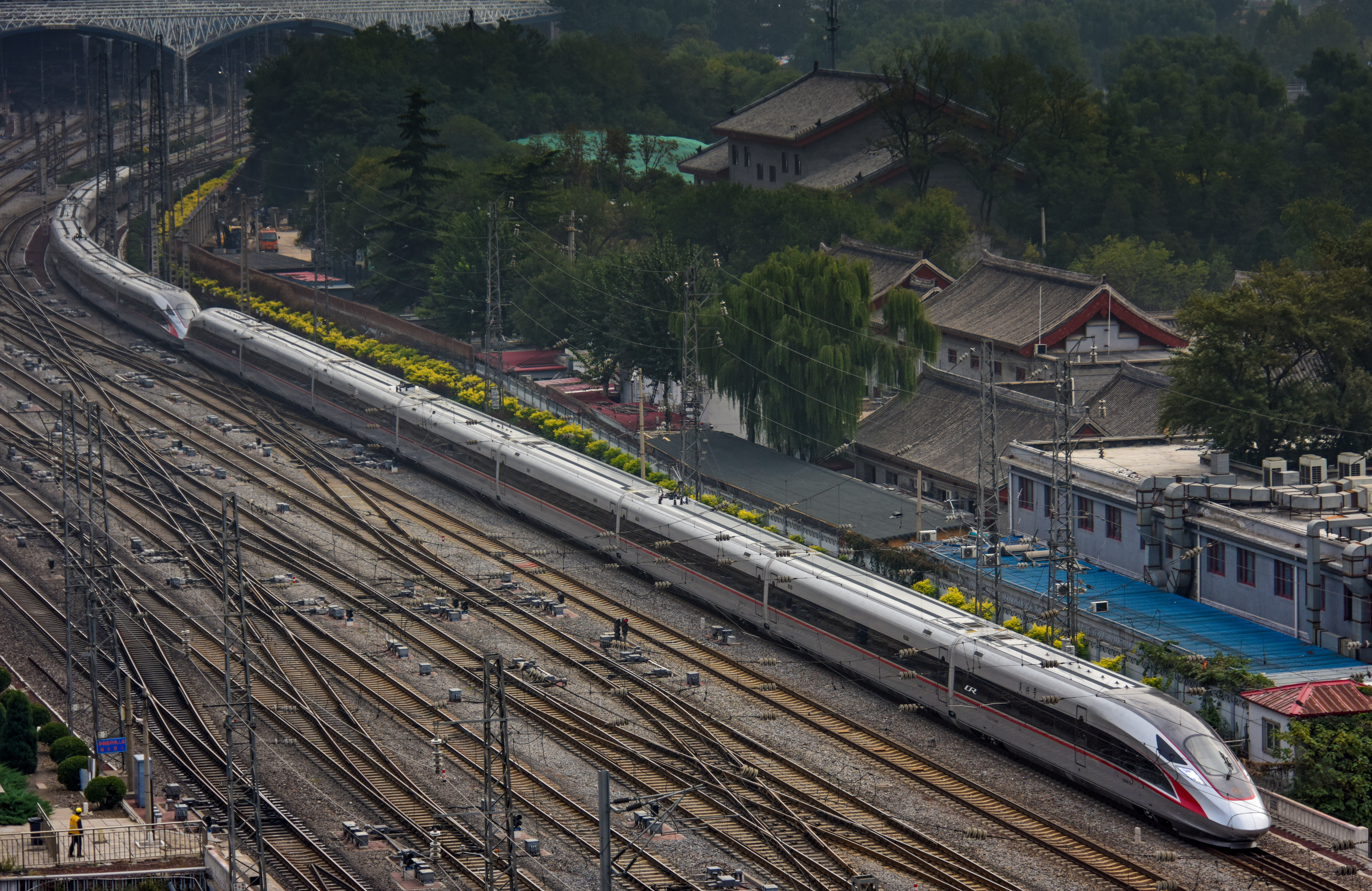
A double-headed CR400AF on G79 service leaving Beijing West in Oct. 2017

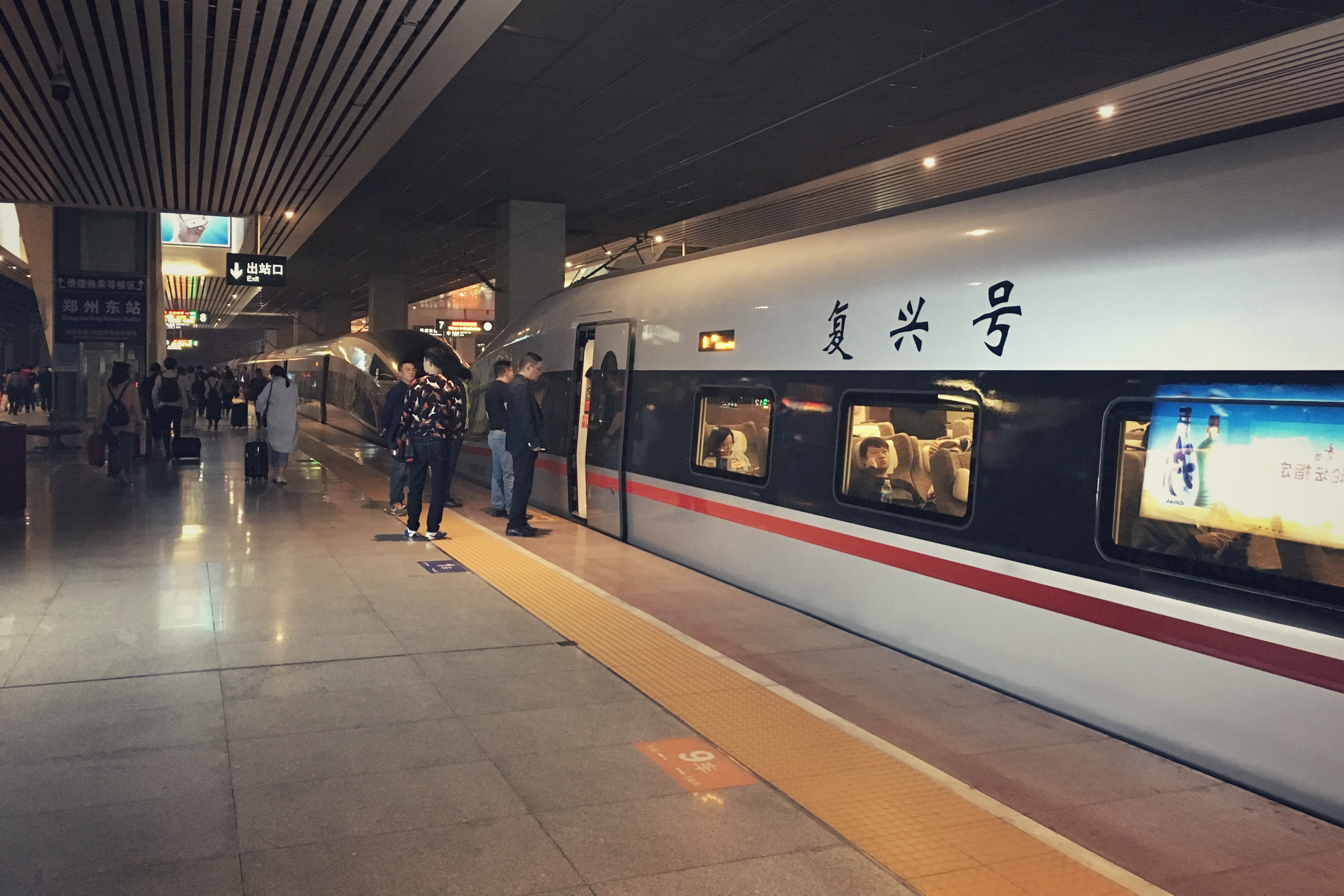
A double-headed CR400AF on G80 service at Zhengzhou East in Oct. 2017

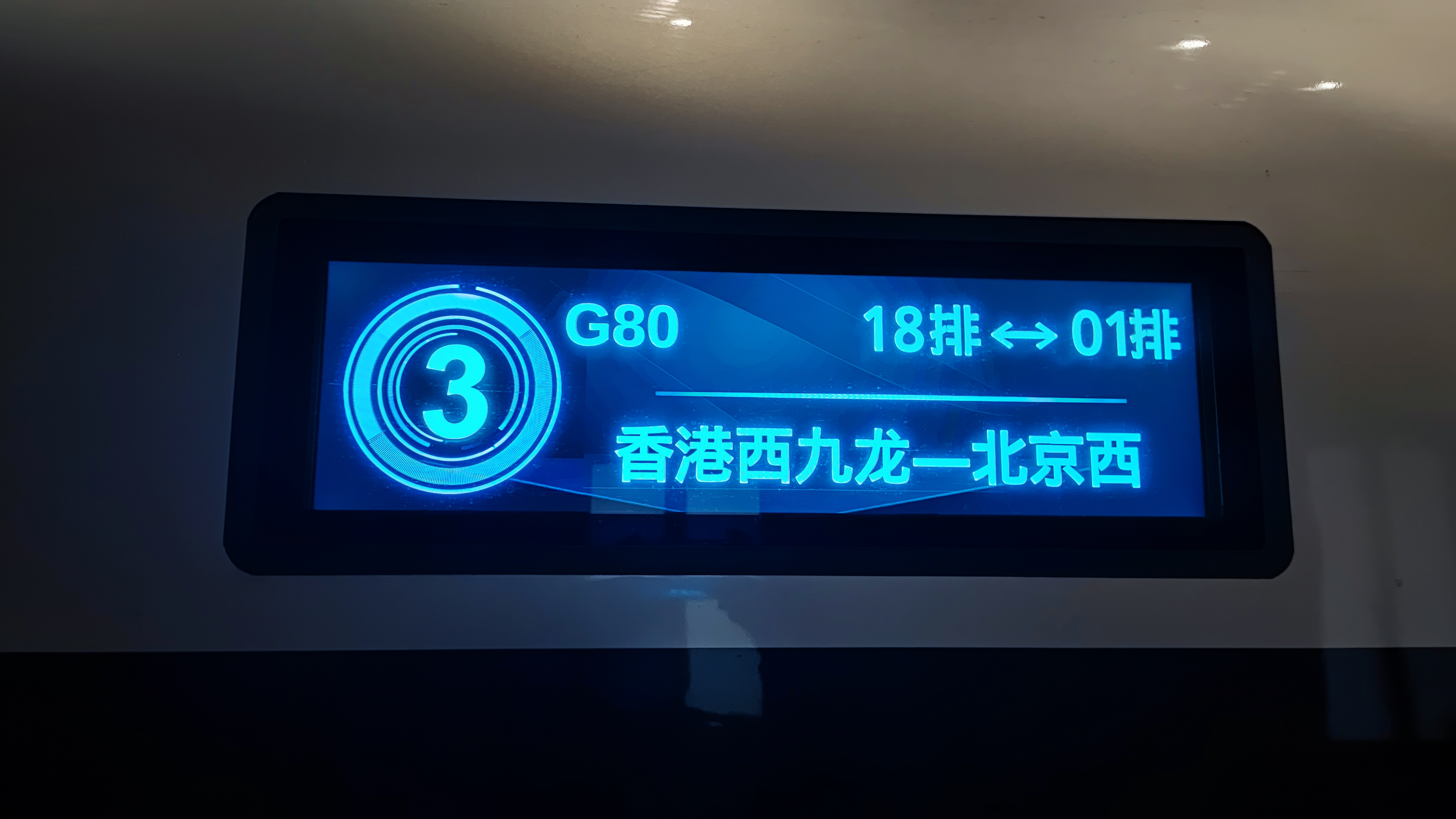
Information screen of the new CR400BF
