= Zhacheng station =

Metro station in Zhengzhou, China

Zhacheng 祭城
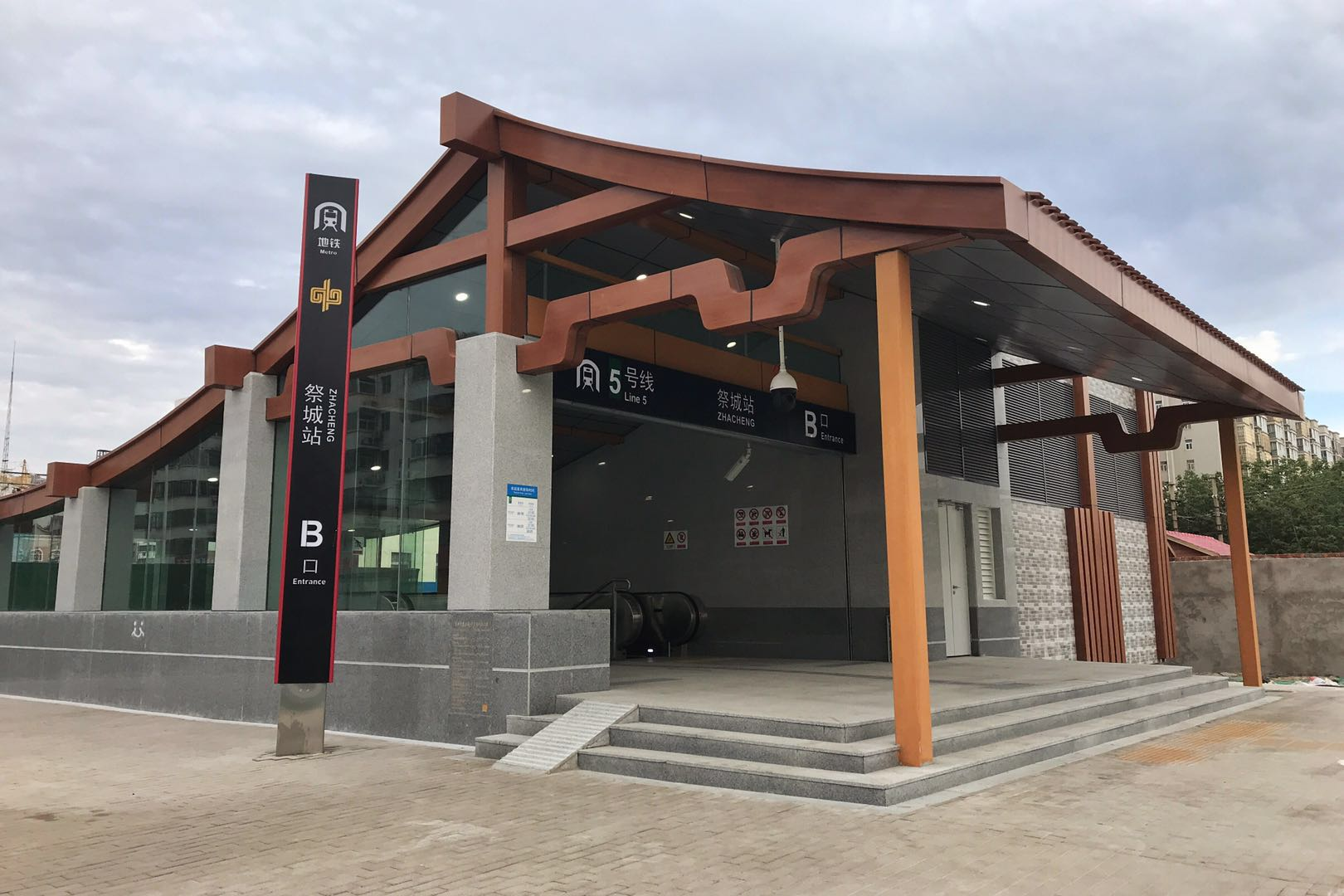

General information
- Location: Chenzhuang Street × Shenghe Street; Jinshui, Zhengzhou; China
- Coordinates: 34.7776°N 113.7609°E
- System: Zhengzhou Metro rapid transit station
- Operator: Zhengzhou Metro
- Line: Line 5
- Platforms: 2 (1 island platform)
- Connections: Bus

Construction
- Structure type: Underground

Other information
- Status: Operational
- Station code: 511

History
- Opened: 20 May 2019

Services
Preceding station	Zhengzhou Metro	Following station
Jinshuidonglu inner loop	Line 5	Children's Hospital outer loop
Location
- Location within Zhengzhou

Zhacheng (Chinese: 祭城) is a metro station of Zhengzhou Metro Line 5.

== History ==
The station was opened on 20 May 2019.

== Station layout ==
The station has two levels underground, The B1 level is for the concourse and the B2 level is for the single island platform of Line 5.

G	-	Exits
B1	Concourse	Customer Service, vending machines
B2; Platforms		← Line 5 inner loop (Jinshuidonglu)
B2; Platforms	Island platform, doors will open on the left
B2; Platforms		Line 5 outer loop (Children's Hospital) →

== Exits ==
The station currently has 3 exits.

Exit	Sign	Destinations	Bus connections
A	Chenzhuang Jie (E)	Zhengzhou No.11 People's Hospital, Jinzhuang Community	278, Y31
B	Shenghe Jie (S)	Zhacheng Community	48, 107, 232, 312
D	Chenzhuang Jie (E)	Zhacheng Community	114, 278, Y31
