= Jinshuidonglu station =

Metro station of Zhengzhou, China

Jinshuidonglu 金水东路
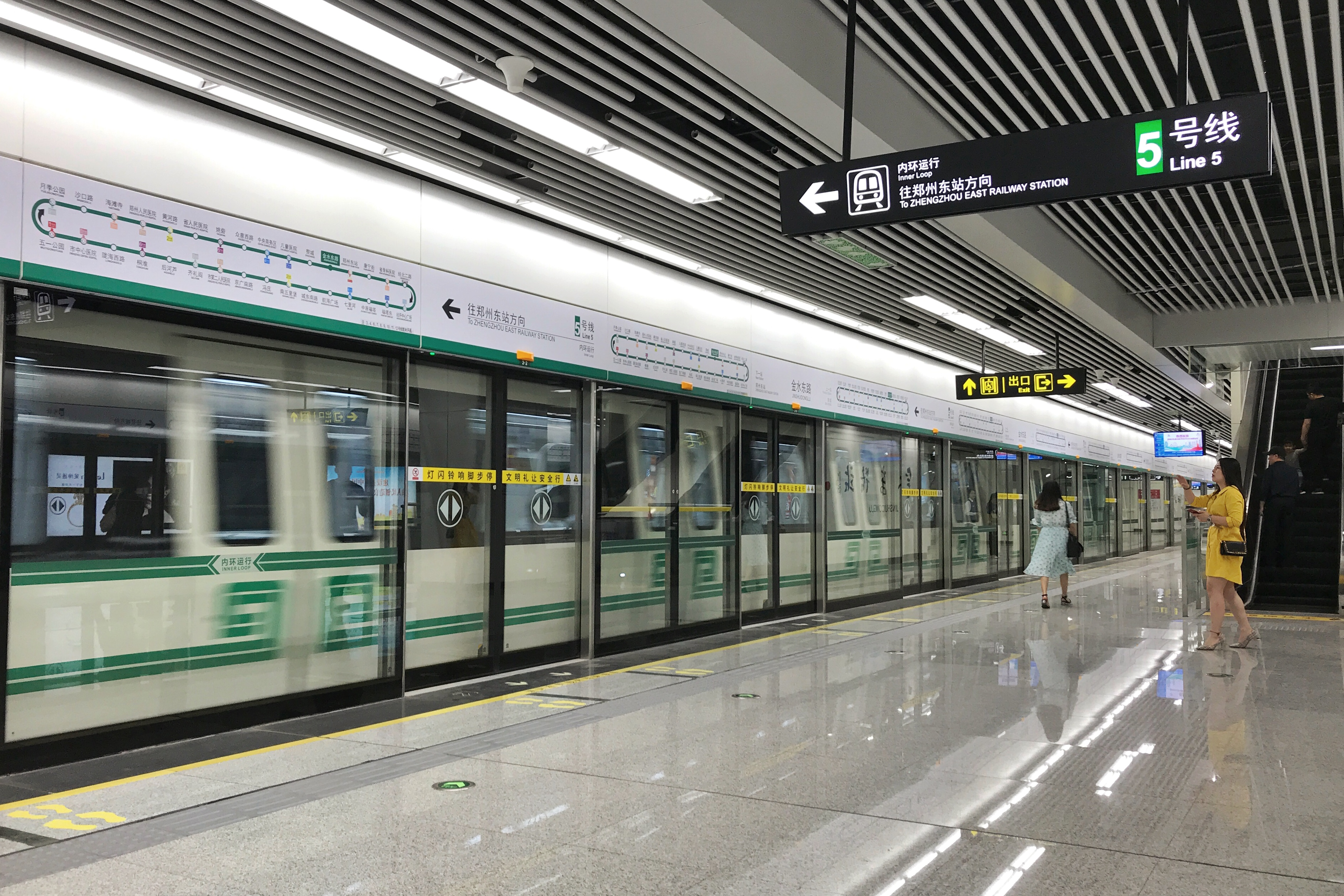
- Platform of the station

General information
- Location: Xinyi Road × Jinshui E. Road; Jinshui, Zhengzhou; China
- Coordinates: 34.7704°N 113.7646°E
- System: Zhengzhou Metro rapid transit station
- Operator: Zhengzhou Metro
- Line: Line 5
- Platforms: 2 (1 island platform)
- Connections: Bus

Construction
- Structure type: Underground

Other information
- Status: Operational
- Station code: 512

History
- Opened: 20 May 2019

Services
Preceding station	Zhengzhou Metro	Following station
Zhengzhoudong Railway Station inner loop	Line 5	Zhacheng outer loop
Location
- Location within Zhengzhou

Jinshuidonglu (Chinese: 金水东路) is a metro station of Zhengzhou Metro Line 5.

== History ==
The station was opened on 20 May 2019.

== Station layout ==
The station has two levels underground, The B1 level is for the concourse and the B2 level is for the single island platform of Line 5.

G	-	Exits
B1	Concourse	Customer Service, vending machines
B2; Platforms		← Line 5 inner loop (Zhengzhoudong Railway Station)
B2; Platforms	Island platform, doors will open on the left
B2; Platforms		Line 5 outer loop (Zhacheng) →

== Exits ==
The station has 4 exits, located at the four corners at the crossing.

Exit	Sign	Destinations	Bus connections
A	Jinshuidong Lu (S)	Henan FTZ Building, Xinyi Road Primary School	43, 115, 160, 326, Garden Expo City Route 6, 游568
B	Jinshuidong Lu (E)	Greenland Yuansheng International, Zhengdong Aloft Hotel	43, 115, 326, 160
C	Jinshuidong Lu (N)	Zhacheng Police Station, Greenland Xinduhui, Xintian 360 Plaza	43, 115, 326
D	Jinshuidong Lu (N)	Kineer IFC	43, 115, 160, 326, Garden Expo City Route 6, 游568
