= Zhengzhou–Kaifeng intercity railway =

Railway line in China

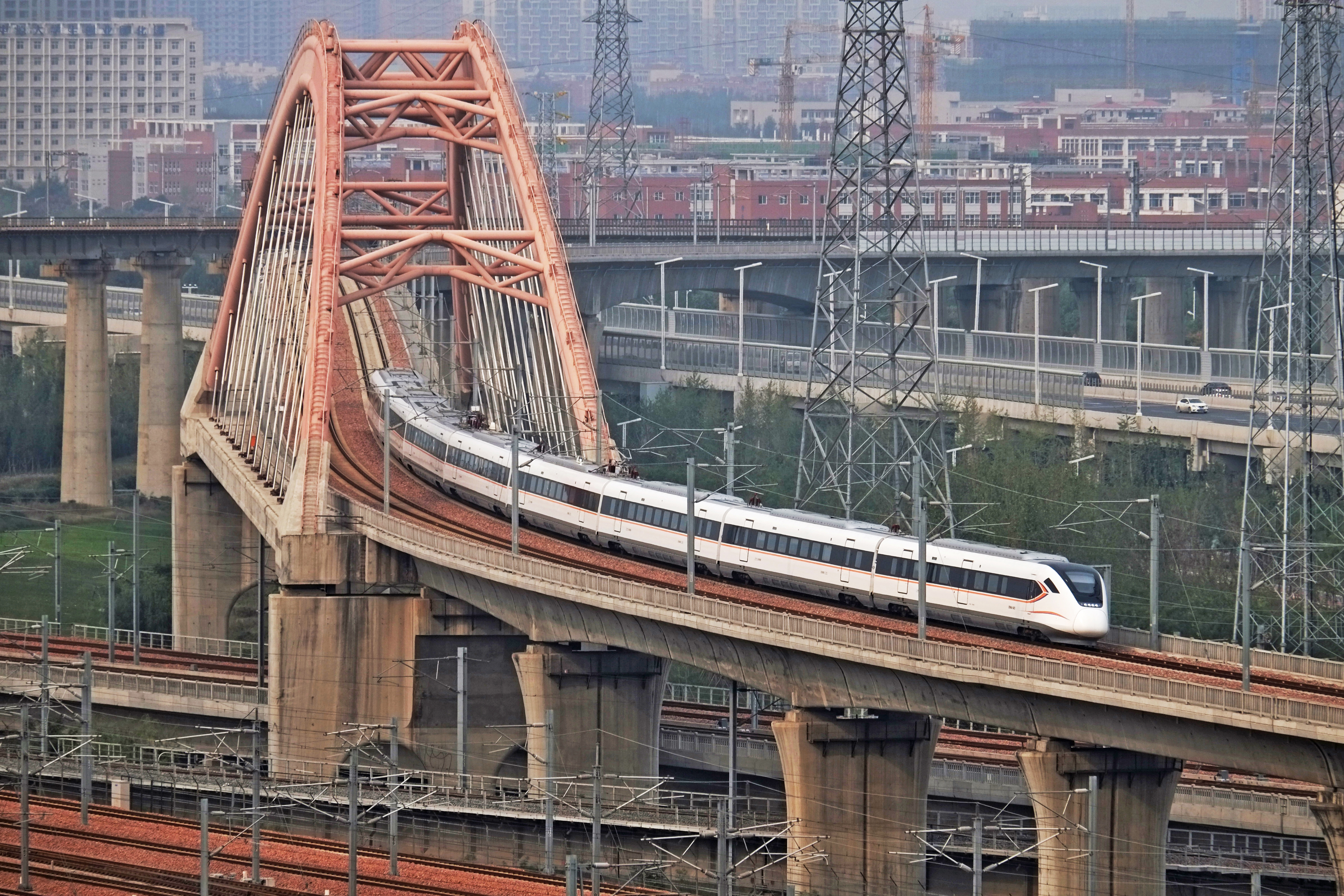
- A CRH6A EMU on the railway near Zhengzhou East railway station

Overview
- Native name: 郑开城际铁路
- Status: Zhengzhou East-Songchenglu section: Operational; Songchenglu–Kaifeng section: Under Construction
- Owner: CR Zhengzhou
- Locale: Zhengzhou; Kaifeng
- Termini: Zhengzhou East; Kaifeng
- Stations: 15

Service
- System: Central Plains MIR
- Operator(s): China Railway High-speed
- Rolling stock: CRH2A (former); CRH6A

History
- Opened: December 28, 2014 (Zhengzhou East-Songchenglu section)

Technical
- Line length: 50.33 km (31 mi)
- Number of tracks: 2 (Double-track)
- Track gauge: 1,435 mm (4 ft 8 1/2 in) standard gauge
- Electrification: 25 kV 50 Hz AC (Overhead line)
- Operating speed: 200 km/h (124 mph)

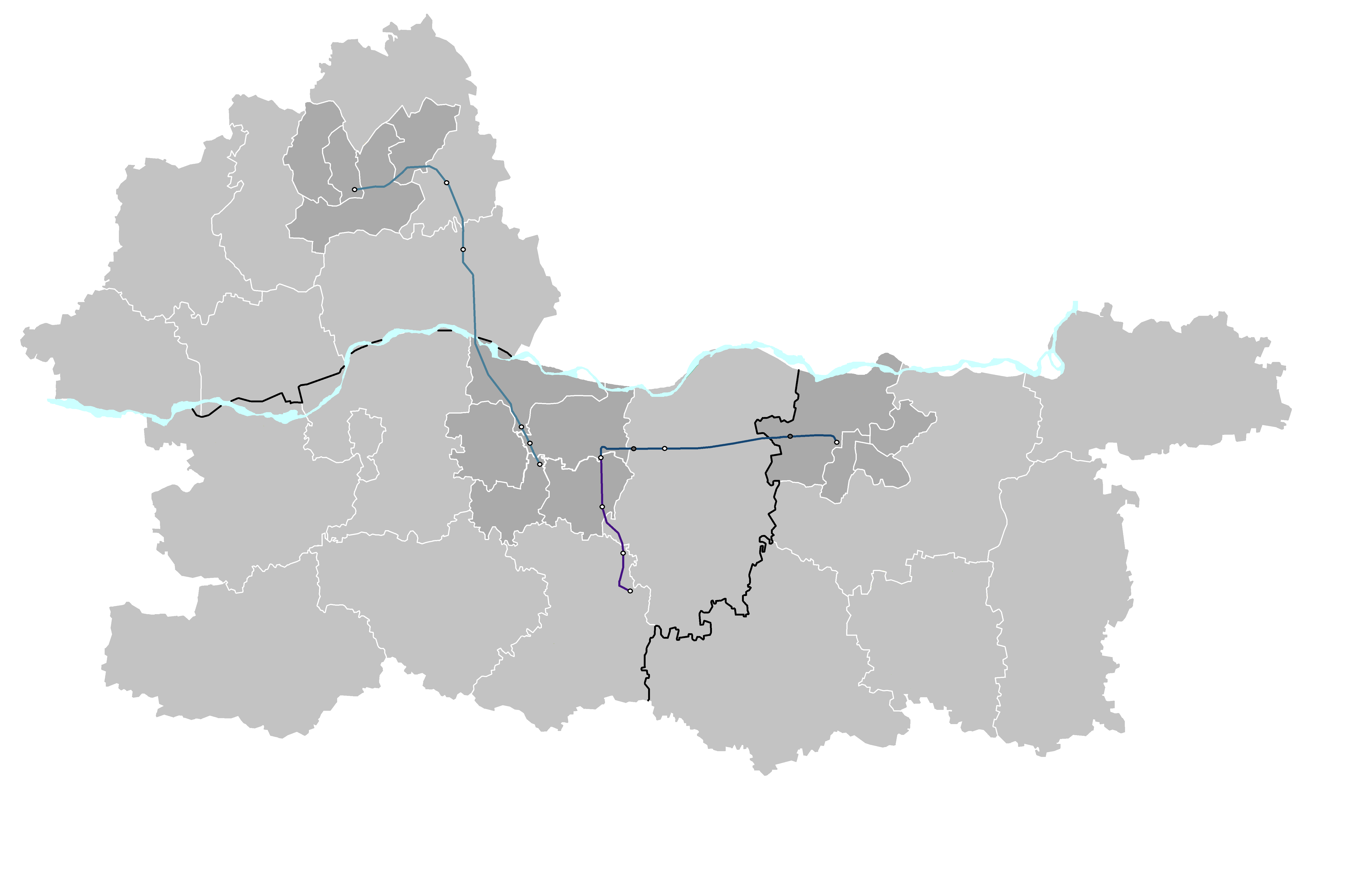
Zhengzhou - Kaifeng Intercity Railway is indicated by the dark blue line

Zhengzhou–Kaifeng intercity railway, abbreviated as the Zhengkai intercity railway, is a higher-speed intercity railway in Henan, China, connecting Zhengzhou and Kaifeng. It is part of the larger Central Plain Metropolitan Intercity Rail network. Construction commenced on December 29, 2009. With a designed top speed of 160 km/h (99 mph), it is built as a double tracked electrified passenger dedicated line. Total length of this project is 50.33 kilometres (31.27 mi), costing an estimated 5.5 billion yuan to construct. Some trains through operate to Zhengzhou Xinzheng Airport via the Zhengji ICR or to Jiaozuo via the Zhengjiao ICR.

The Zhengzhou East - Songchenglu section commenced operation on 28 December 2014. The phase II project (Songchenglu - Kaifeng section) was completed on March 15, 2025.

== Route ==
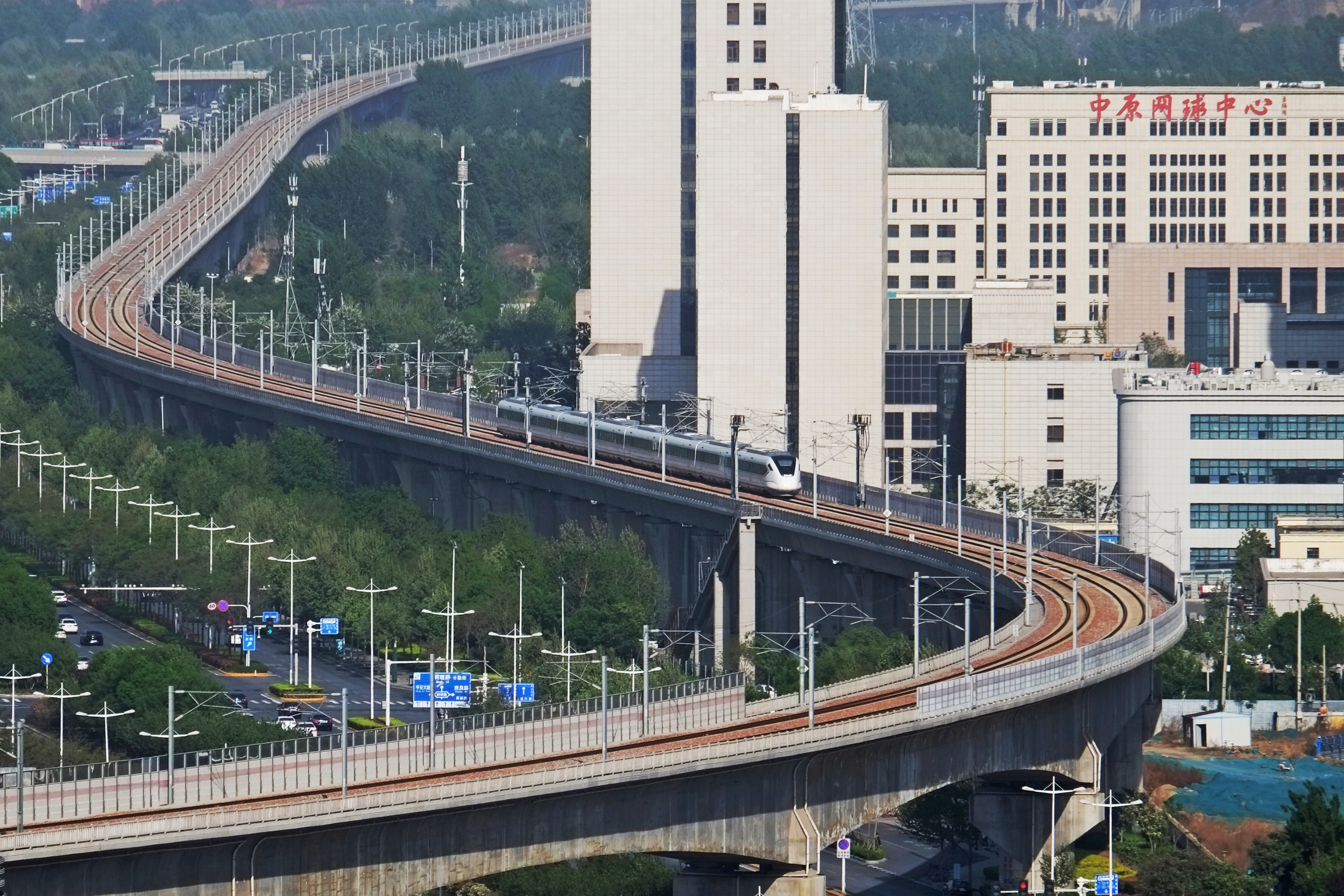
The railway in Zhengdong New Area

=== Phase I ===
The first phase is from Zhengzhou East railway station to Songchenglu, via Jialuhe, Lüboyuan and Yulianghe.

On 10 January 2016, Jialuhe station and Yulianghe station were closed due to lack of passengers. They were re-opened on September 28, 2024

Station code	Station name		Connections	Location	City
Station code	English	Chinese	Connections	Location	City
ZAF	Zhengzhou East	郑州东	1 5 8	Jinshui	Zhengzhou
JLF	Jialuhe	贾鲁河		Zhongmu	Zhengzhou
LCF	Lüboyuan	绿博园		Zhongmu	Zhengzhou
YEF	Yunlianghe	运粮河		Longting	Kaifeng
SFF	Songchenglu	宋城路		Longting	Kaifeng

=== Phase II ===
The phase II project extended the line to Kaifeng railway station from Songchenglu. Construction started on June 20, 2022, and was completed on March 15, 2025. The extension is 7.17 km (4.46 mi) in length.

=== Future Development ===
Seven more stations along the line are in the future plan, including Zhongyixueyuan, Dayouzhuang, Yuantangshu, Dameng, Dangzhuang, Cangzhai and Bianxi.

== Rolling stock ==
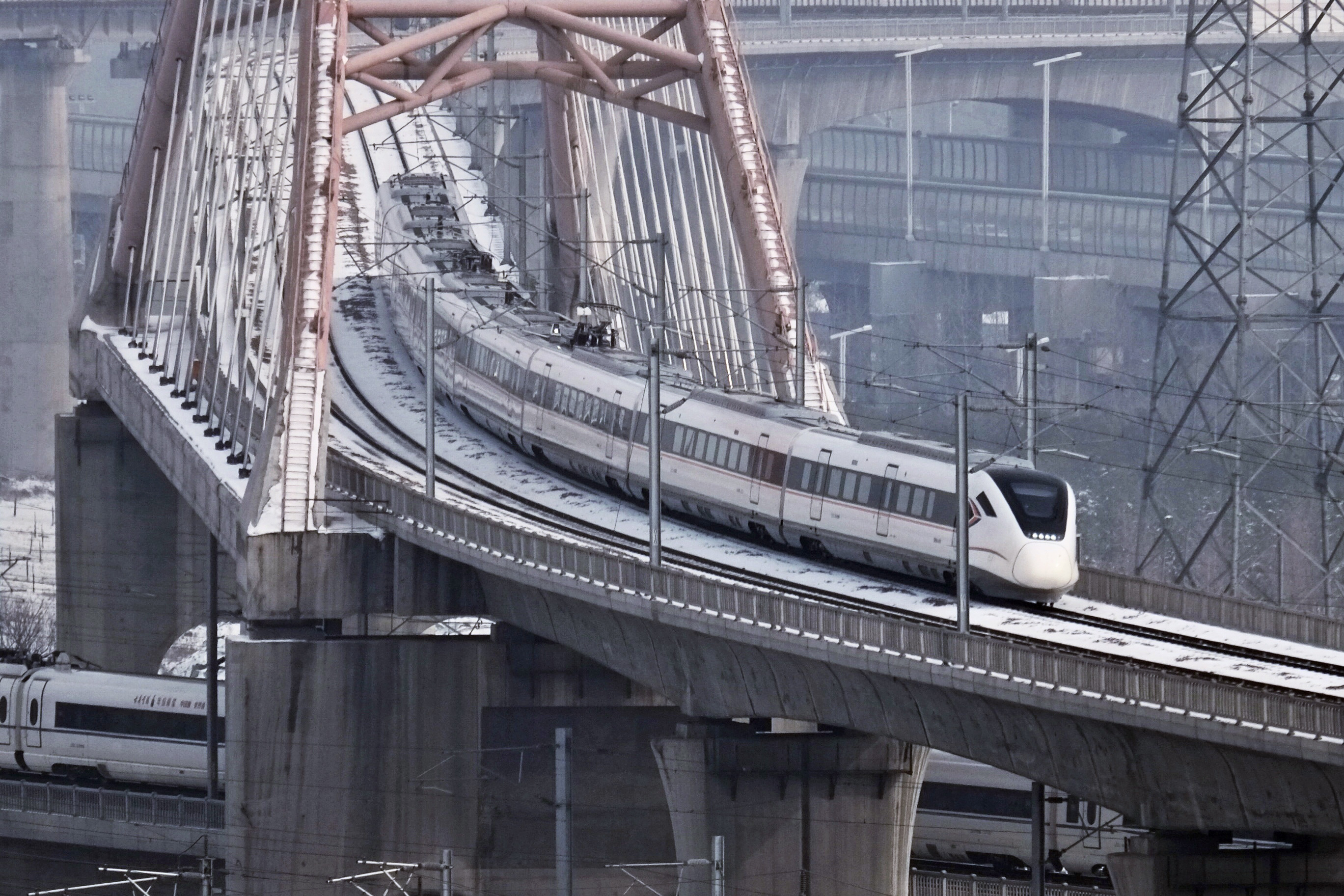
CRH6A trains are operated on this railway

The railway is using CRH6A intercity EMUs for service, starting from February 2018. Prior to that, CRH2A EMUs were operated.

== Fare ==
At initial operation stage, the fare was 28 yuan for first-class and 18 yuan for second-class over the whole trip.

After February 2018, with the use of new CRH6A EMUs, fixed seat numbers have been cancelled, as well as the first class seats. The fare is 18 yuan for a ticket.

The elderly, children and disabled soldiers enjoy a 30% discount.

From 28 April 2018, there will be a discount fare for the trains on this railway.
