= Songchenglu railway station =

Railway station in Kaifeng, China

Songchenglu 宋城路
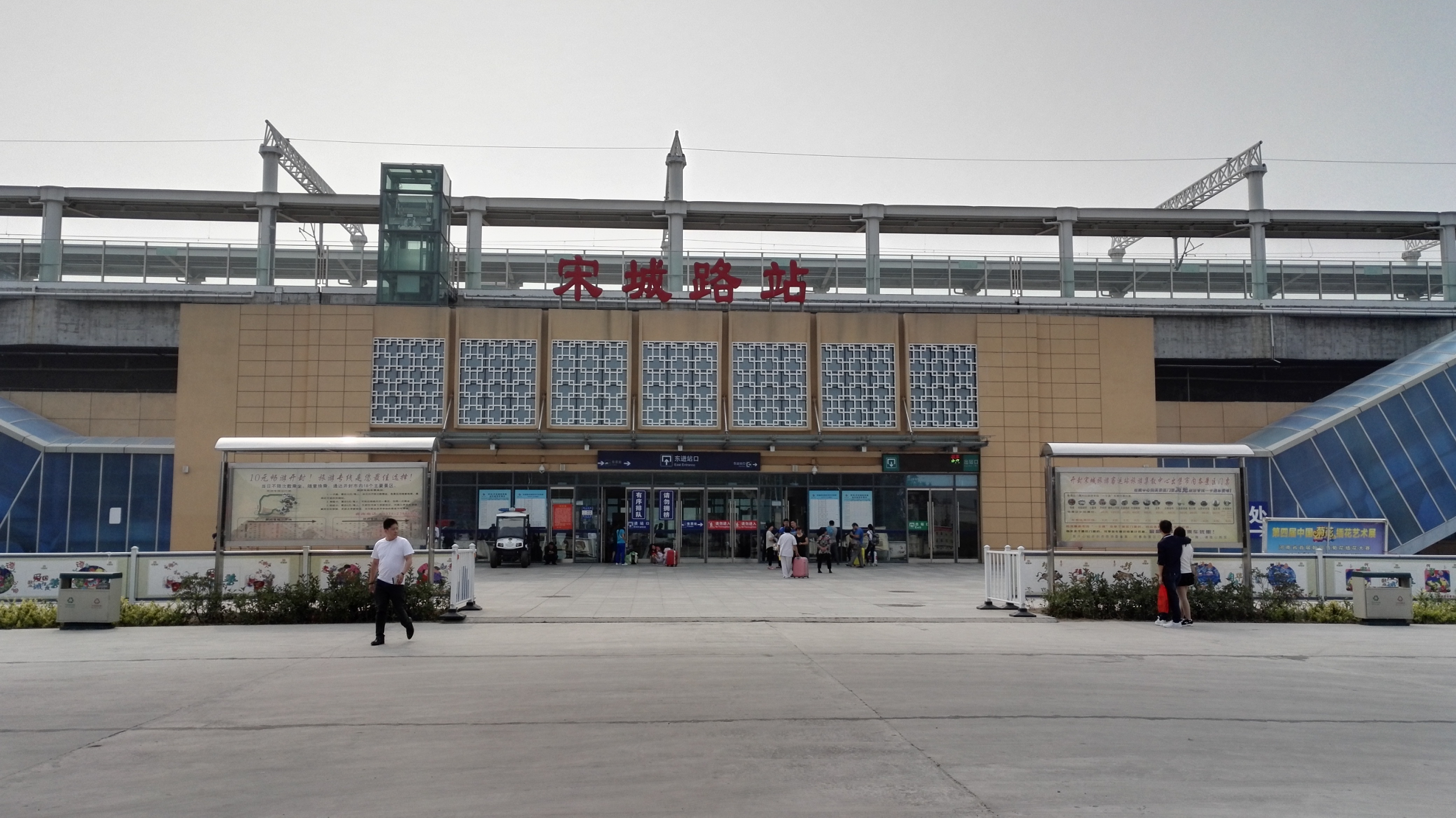

General information
- Location: Songcheng Road; Longting District, Kaifeng, Henan; China
- Coordinates: 34.7850°N 114.2842°E
- Operated by: CR Zhengzhou
- Line: Zhengzhou–Kaifeng intercity railway
- Platforms: 2
- Tracks: 2
- Connections: Bus

Construction
- Structure type: Elevated

Other information
- Status: Operational
- Station code: 65761 (TMIS code); SFF (telegraph code); SCL (Pinyin code)

History
- Opened: 28 December 2014
Location

The Songchenglu railway station (Chinese: 宋城路站) is a railway station on the Zhengzhou–Kaifeng intercity railway. The station is located on the south side of Songcheng Road, Kaifeng, Henan, China.

The station currently serves as the eastern terminus of the Zhengzhou–Kaifeng intercity railway. The under-construction phase II project will extend the railway from this station to Kaifeng railway station.

Preceding station	China Railway High-speed	Following station
Yunlianghe towards Zhengzhou East	Zhengzhou–Kaifeng intercity railway	Terminus
