= Kaifeng railway station =

Railway station in Kaifeng, China

Kaifeng 开封
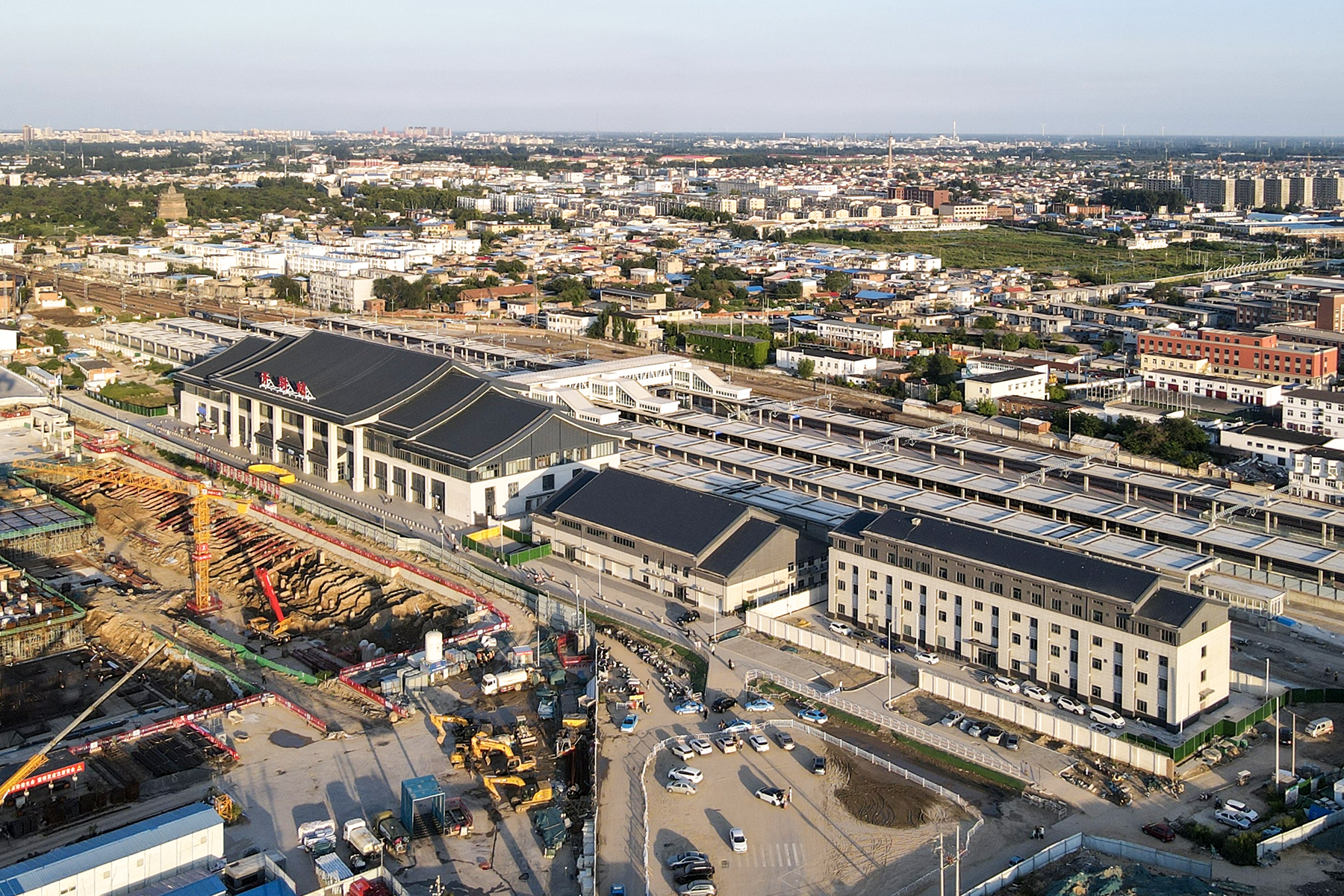

General information
- Location: 1 Zhongshan Road; Yuwangtai District, Kaifeng, Henan; China
- Coordinates: 34.7716°N 114.3477°E
- Operator: CR Zhengzhou
- Line: Longhai Railway
- Platforms: 3 (1 side platform and 1 island platform)
- Connections: Bus terminal

Other information
- Station code: 38774 (TMIS code); KFF (telegraph code); KFE (Pinyin code)
- Classification: Class 1 station (一等站)

History
- Opened: 1909

Services
Preceding station	China Railway	Following station
Lankao towards Lianyungang East	Longhai railway	Zhengzhou towards Lanzhou
Location
- Location within Henan Location within China

Kaifeng railway station (Chinese: 开封站) is a station on Longhai railway in Kaifeng, Henan.

== History ==
In 1905, the construction of Kaifeng-Luoyang railway (the first section of the Longhai railway) started in order to connect Kaifeng, the province capital at that time, to the Beijing-Hankou railway at Zhengzhou. The Kaifeng-Zhengzhou section of the Kaifeng-Luoyang railway started operation in 1907, making the station the first station opened on Longhai railway (Zhengzhou railway station was regarded to be on the Beijing-Hankou railway then).

The current station building was finished and opened on 1 January 2024.

== Future development ==
The station is planned to be renovated to serve as the terminus of Zhengzhou-Kaifeng intercity railway. The station will be expanded with a brand new station building. The project is expected to be finished in 2019.

== See also ==
- Kaifeng North railway station
