= Zhengzhou East railway station =

Railway station in Zhengzhou, China

Zhengzhoudong 郑州东
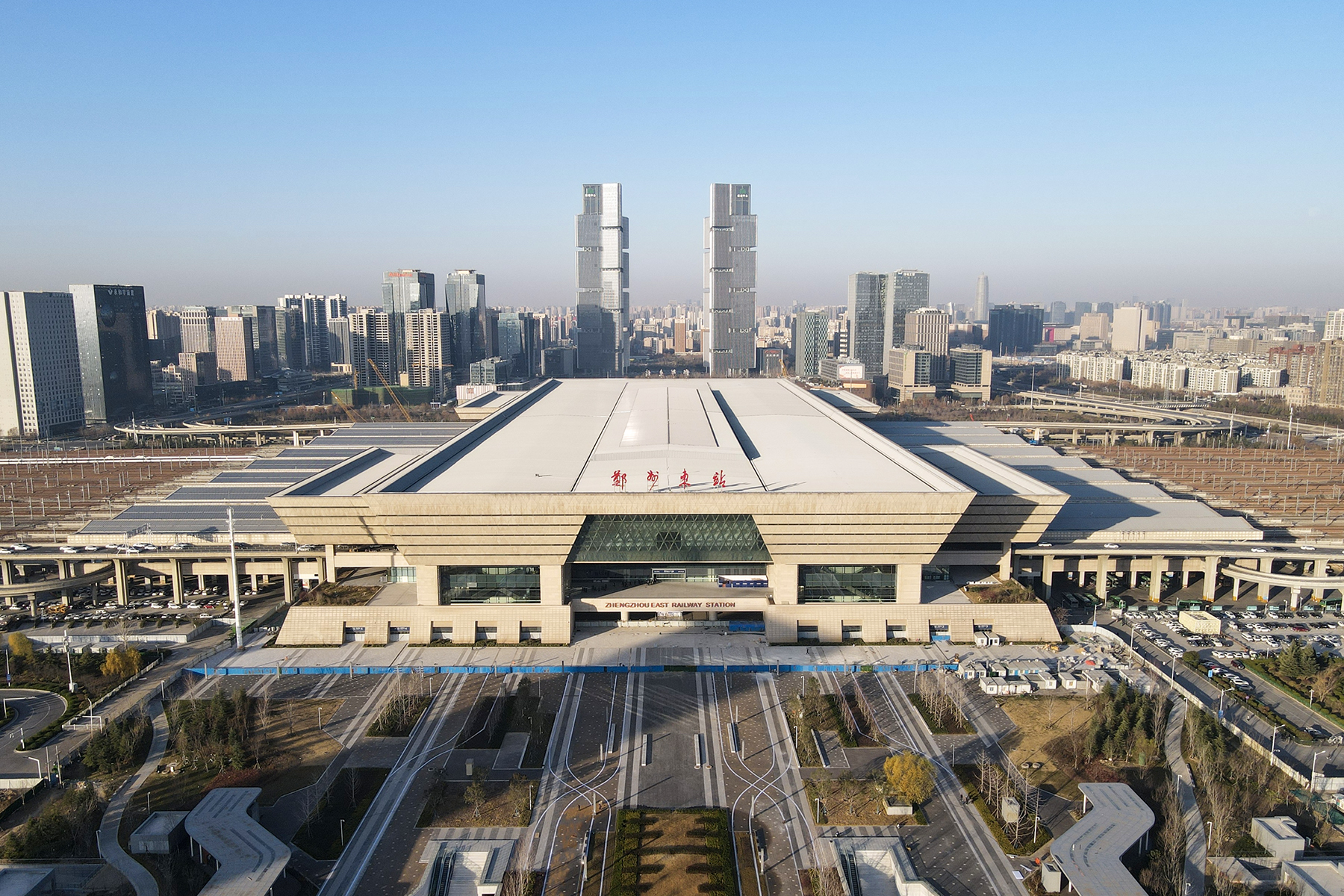

General information
- Other names: Zhengzhou East
- Location: 199 Xinyi Road; Jinshui District, Zhengzhou, Henan; China
- Coordinates: 34.7601°N 113.7730°E
- Operator: CR Zhengzhou
- Lines: China Railway High-Speed: Shijiazhuang–Wuhan high-speed railway; Xuzhou–Lanzhou high-speed railway; Zhengzhou–Wanzhou high-speed railway; Zhengzhou–Fuyang high-speed railway; Henan Intercity Railway: Zhengzhou–Kaifeng intercity railway; Zhengzhou–Xinzheng Airport intercity railway
- Platforms: 30 (14 island platforms and 2 side platforms)
- Tracks: 32
- Connections: Zhengzhou East railway station; Bus terminus

Other information
- Station code: 65773 (TMIS code); ZAF (telegraph code); ZZD (Pinyin code)
- Classification: Top Class station (特等站)

History
- Opened: September 28, 2012

Key dates
- 2012-12-26: Beijing–Zhengzhou section of Beijing–Guangzhou–Shenzhen–Hong Kong high-speed railway opened
- 2014-12-28: Zhengzhou–Kaifeng intercity railway opened
- 2015-12-31: Zhengzhou–Xinzheng Airport intercity railway opened
- 2016-09-10: Zhengzhou–Xuzhou high-speed railway opened

Services
Preceding station	China Railway High-speed	Following station
Xinxiang East towards Shijiazhuang	Shijiazhuang–Wuhan high-speed railway	Xuchang East towards Wuhan
Kaifeng North towards Xuzhou East	Xuzhou–Lanzhou high-speed railway	Zhengzhou West towards Lanzhou West
Terminus	Zhengzhou–Kaifeng intercity railway	Jialuhe towards Songchenglu
Terminus	Zhengzhou–Xinzheng Airport intercity railway	Nancao towards Zhengzhou Hangkonggang
Location
- Location within Zhengzhou Location within Henan

Zhengzhoudong (Zhengzhou East) railway station (simplified Chinese: 郑州东站; traditional Chinese: 鄭州東站; pinyin: zhèngzhōu dōngzhàn) is a railway station for high-speed trains in Zhengzhou, Henan, China. It is located approximately 3 km southeast of the Zhengdong New Area CBD. Located on the junction of the North-South Beijing–Guangzhou high-speed railway and the East-West Xuzhou–Lanzhou high-speed railway, it is one of the largest passenger railway stations in China.

The calligraphic Chinese characters in the station sign were written by Wu Bangguo, the former chairman of the Standing Committee of the National People's Congress.

== History ==
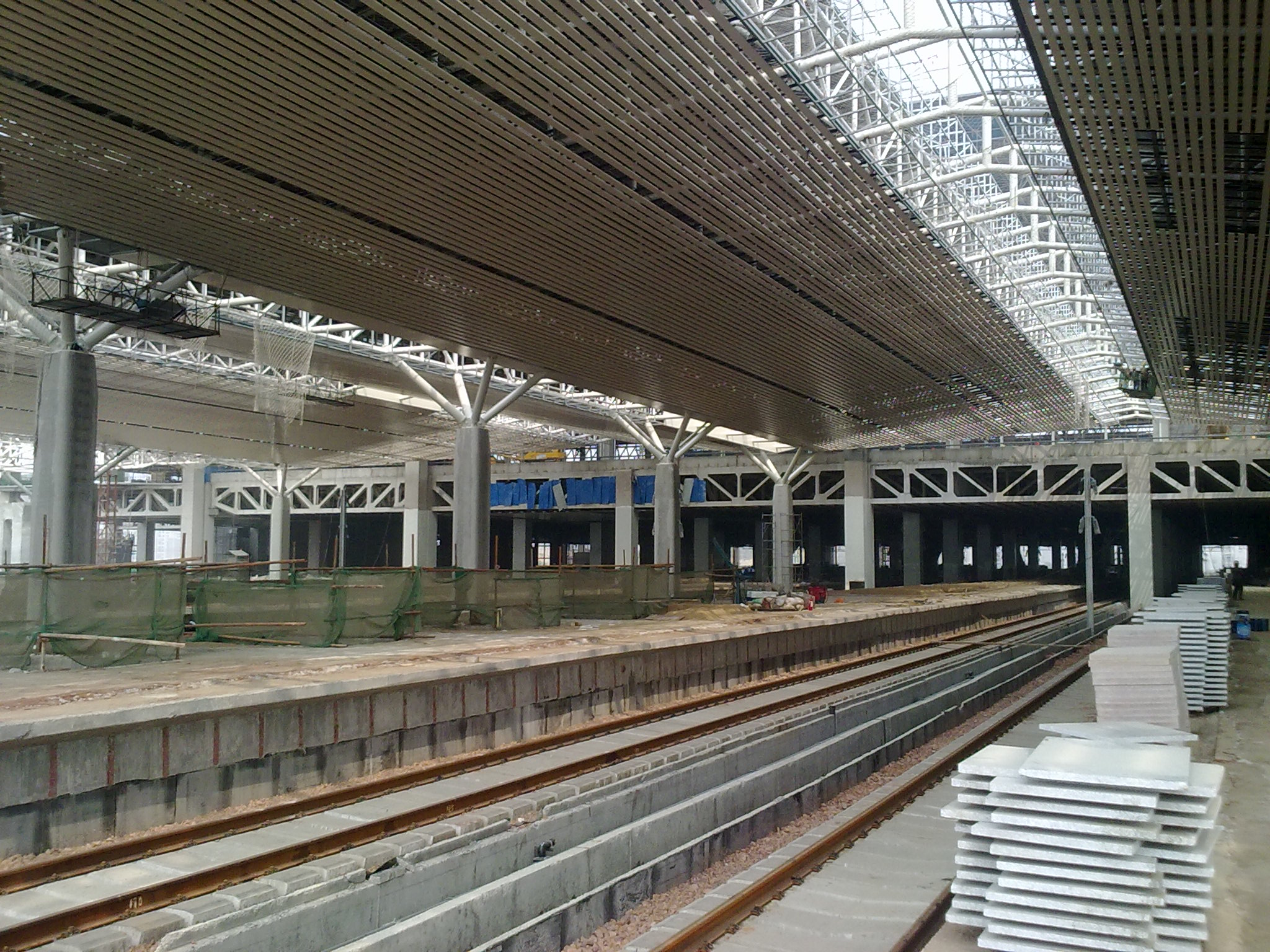
The station under construction in 2011

The station began construction on 29 June 2009 and was opened on 28 September 2012, together with the opening of the Beijing–Guangzhou HSR (Shijiazhuang–Wuhan section).

On 26 December 2012, high-speed train services to Beijing began after the completion of the Shijiazhuang–Wuhan section of the Beijing–Guangzhou HSR. It takes about only 2.5 hours from the station to Beijing West by high-speed trains.

On 28 December 2013, Zhengzhou Metro Line 1 commenced operation and started to serve the station.

The intercity train services in Zhengzhou East started on 28 December 2014, with the opening of the Zhengzhou-Kaifeng Intercity Railway. Currently, intercity trains from the station to Songchenglu (Kaifeng), Jiaozuo and Xinzheng Airport are in operation.

The Zhengzhou-Xuzhou section of the Xuzhou–Lanzhou HSR was opened on 10 September 2016, providing high-speed train services to major cities in eastern China, including Shanghai, Nanjing and Hangzhou.

With the opening of the Hong Kong section of the Guangzhou–Hong Kong HSR, a daily high-speed train service (G79/80) connecting this station and Hong Kong West Kowloon became available, taking around 6 hours and 20 minutes from the station to West Kowloon.

== Infrastructure ==
The station covers an area of 219.07 hectares and has a floor area of 350,000 square meters. Costing RMB 4 billion, it consists of 30 platforms (2 side platforms and 14 island platforms) and 32 tracks. Platforms 1-16 are designated for the Beijing–Guangzhou–Shenzhen–Hong Kong high-speed railway and platforms 21-30 designated for the Xuzhou–Lanzhou High-Speed Railway. Platforms 17-20 are for intercity trains.

The station has a total of seven levels, three of which are below ground level. The departure hall (waiting area) is on the 3rd level while catering services are provided on the 4th level. The platforms are located on the 2nd level. The arrival areas, exits and parking areas are on the ground level. The basement levels are for Zhengzhou Metro.

Self-service flight check-in devices are provided in the intercity waiting area of the departure hall for passengers taking the intercity trains to Zhengzhou Xinzheng International Airport.

== Destinations ==
Carriers	Destinations
CR Beijing	Baoji South, Beijing West, Changsha South, Chengdu East, Chongqing West, Futian, Guangzhou South, Guiyang North, Kunming South, Lanzhou West, Nanchang West, Nanning East, Qinhuangdao, Shanghai Hongqiao, Shenzhen North, Shijiazhuang, Tangshan, Tianjin West, Wuhan, Xi'an North, Yingtan North, Zhanjiang West, Zhuhai
CR Chengdu	Beijing West, Chengdu East, Chongqing North, Guiyang North, Xuzhou East
CR Guangzhou	Beijing West, Changsha South, Guangzhou South, Hong Kong West Kowloon, Jinan West, Shenzhen North, Taiyuan South, Xi'an North, Zhuhai
CR Harbin	Harbin West, Wuhan
CR Jinan	Changsha South, Chongqing North, Chongqing West, Guangzhou South, Jinan West, Kunming South, Lanzhou West, Qingdao, Qingdao North, Rongcheng, Shenzhen North, Yantai
CR Kunming	Beijing West, Kunming South, Yuxi
CR Lanzhou	Changsha South, Guangzhou South, Hangzhou East, Lanzhou West, Xuzhou
CR Nanchang	Beijing West, Fuzhou, Lanzhou West, Nanchang West, Xi'an North
CR Nanning	Beijing West, Jinan West, Nanning East
CR Shanghai	Chengdu East, Chongqing West, Hangzhou East, Hefei South, Jinhua South, Lanzhou West, Nanjing South, Ningbo, Shanghai, Shanghai Hongqiao, Taiyuan South, Xi'an North
CR Shenyang	Changchun, Changsha South, Chengdu East, Dalian North, Shenyang North
CR Taiyuan	Changsha South, Shanghai Hongqiao, Taiyuan South
CR Wuhan	Beijing West, Guangzhou South, Hankou, Jinan West, Qingdao, Taiyuan South, Tianjin West, Wuhan, Yichang East
CR Xi'an	Baoji South, Beijing West, Guangzhou South, Guiyang North, Shanghai Hongqiao, Wenzhou South, Xi'an North, Xuzhou East, Yiwu
CR Zhengzhou	Anyang East, Beijing West, Chengdu East, Chongqing West, Fuzhou, Guangzhou South, Guilin, Guiyang North, Hangzhou East, Hankou, Jiaozuo, Lanzhou West, Luoyang Longmen, Ningbo, Qingdao North, Shenyang North, Shenzhen North, Shanghai Hongqiao, Shangqiu, Songchenglu, Taiyuan South, Wenzhou South, Xi'an North, Xiamen North, Xinzheng Airport, Xuchang East, Zhengzhou

== Gallery ==
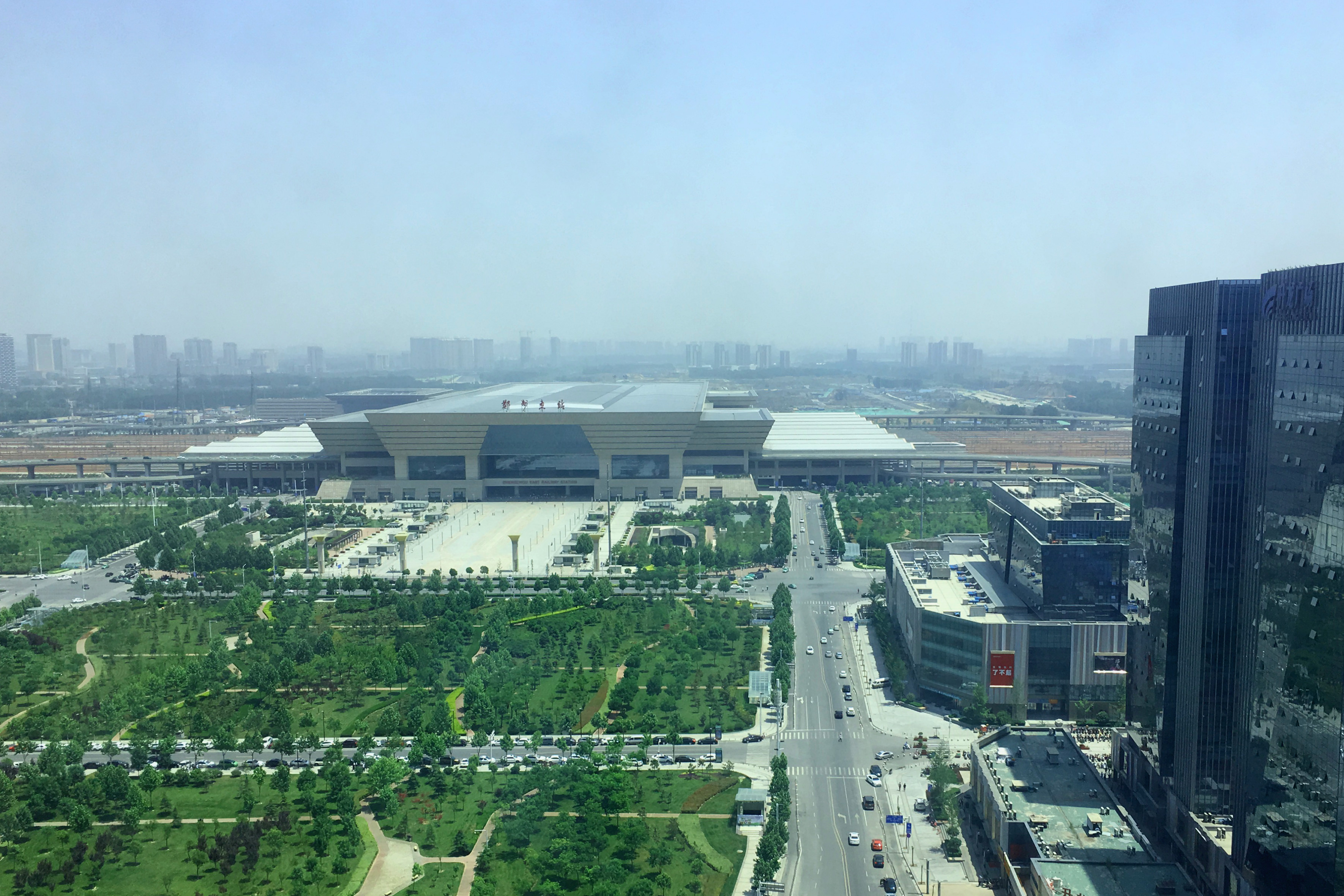
Aerial view of the station

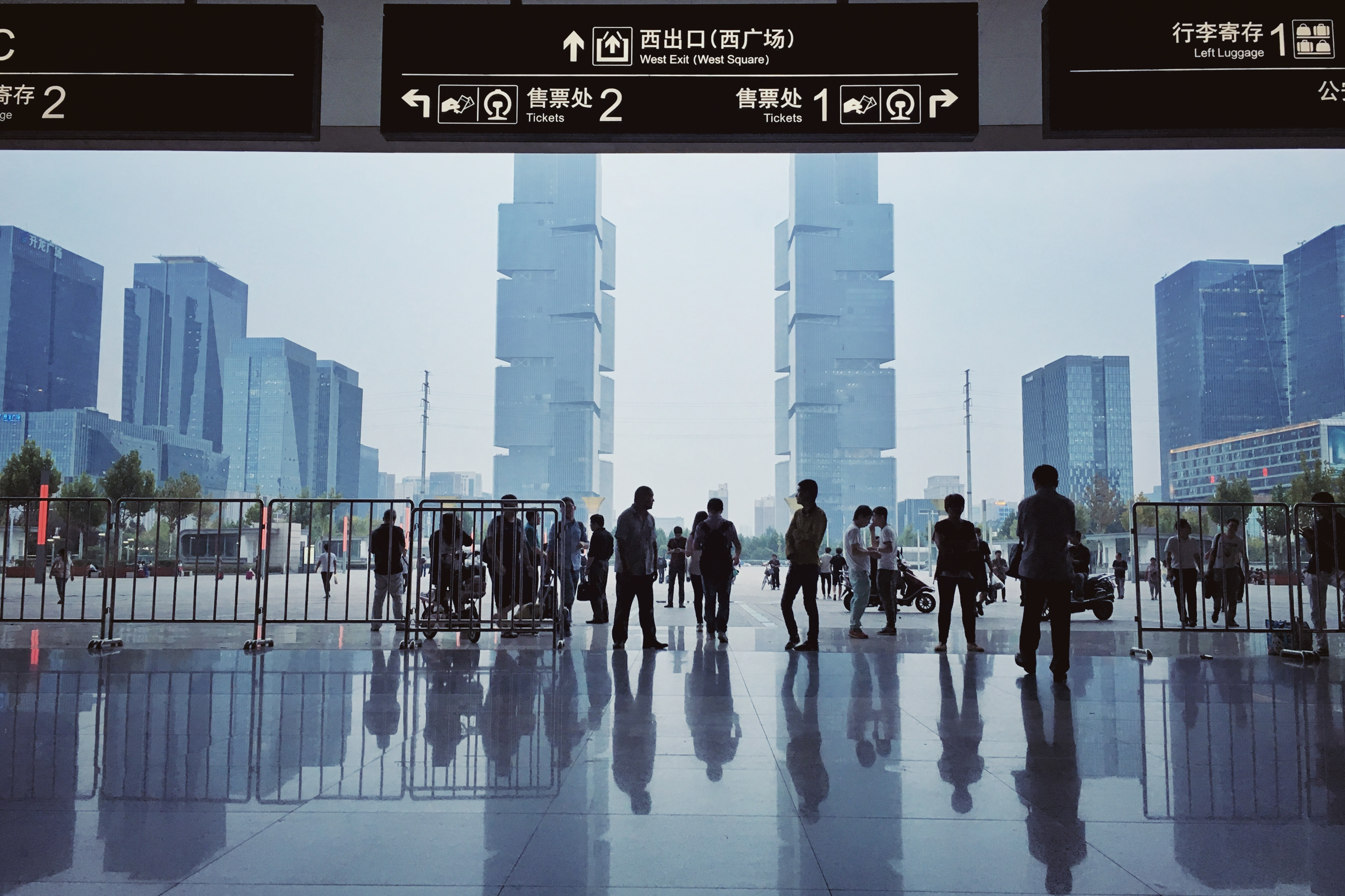
West exit and the business district outside the station

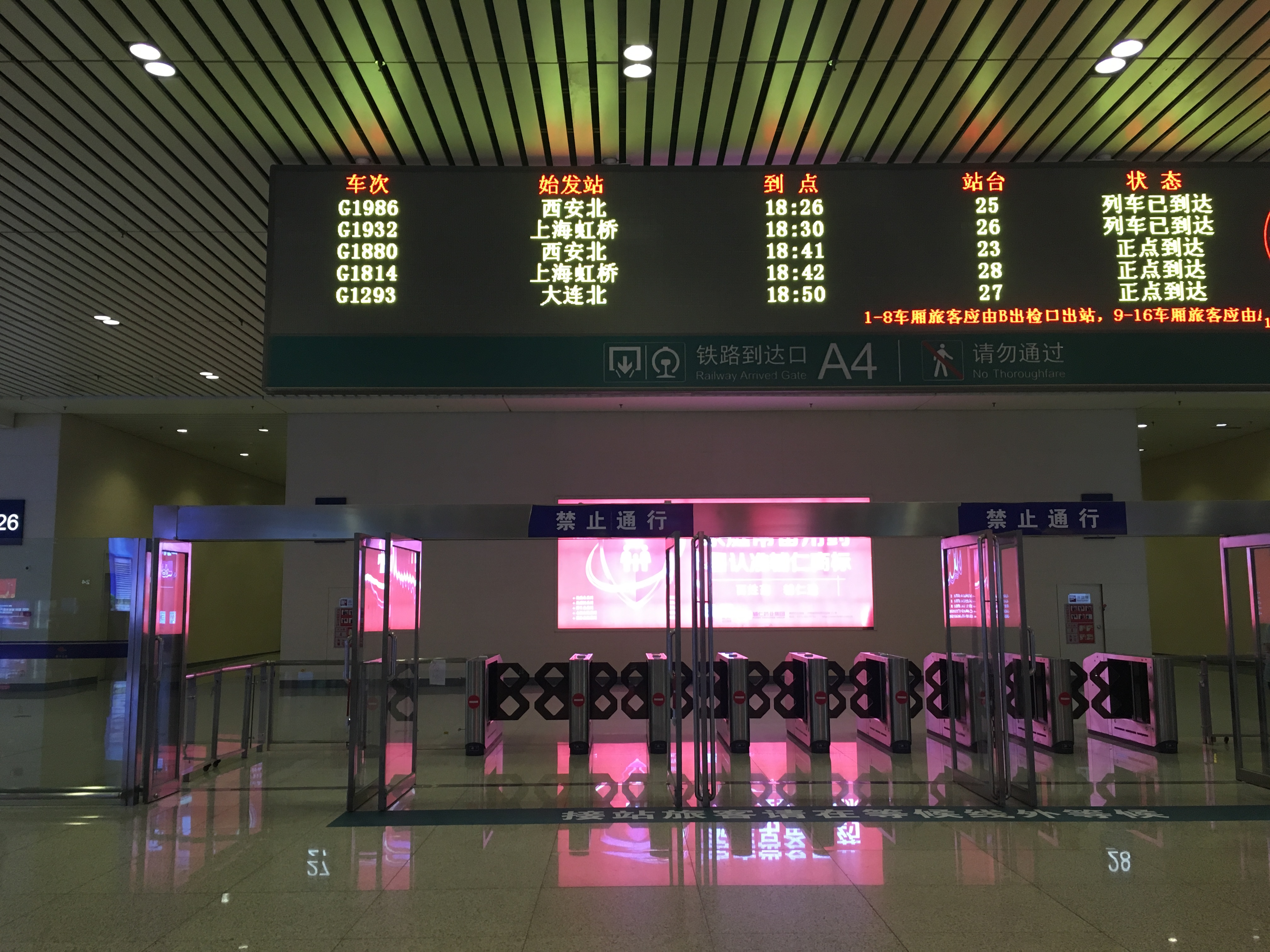
Arrival area
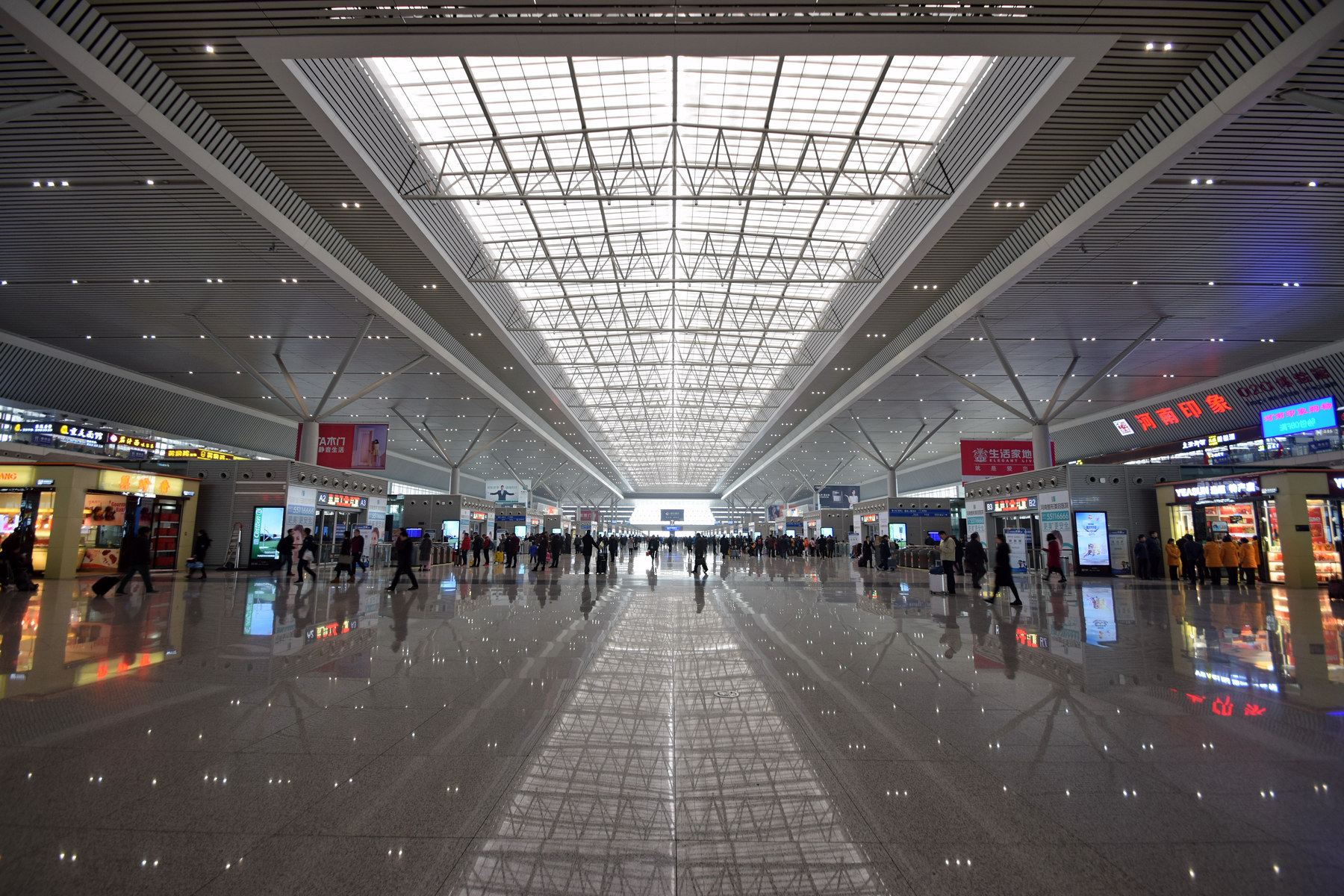
Concourse of Zhengzhou East railway station

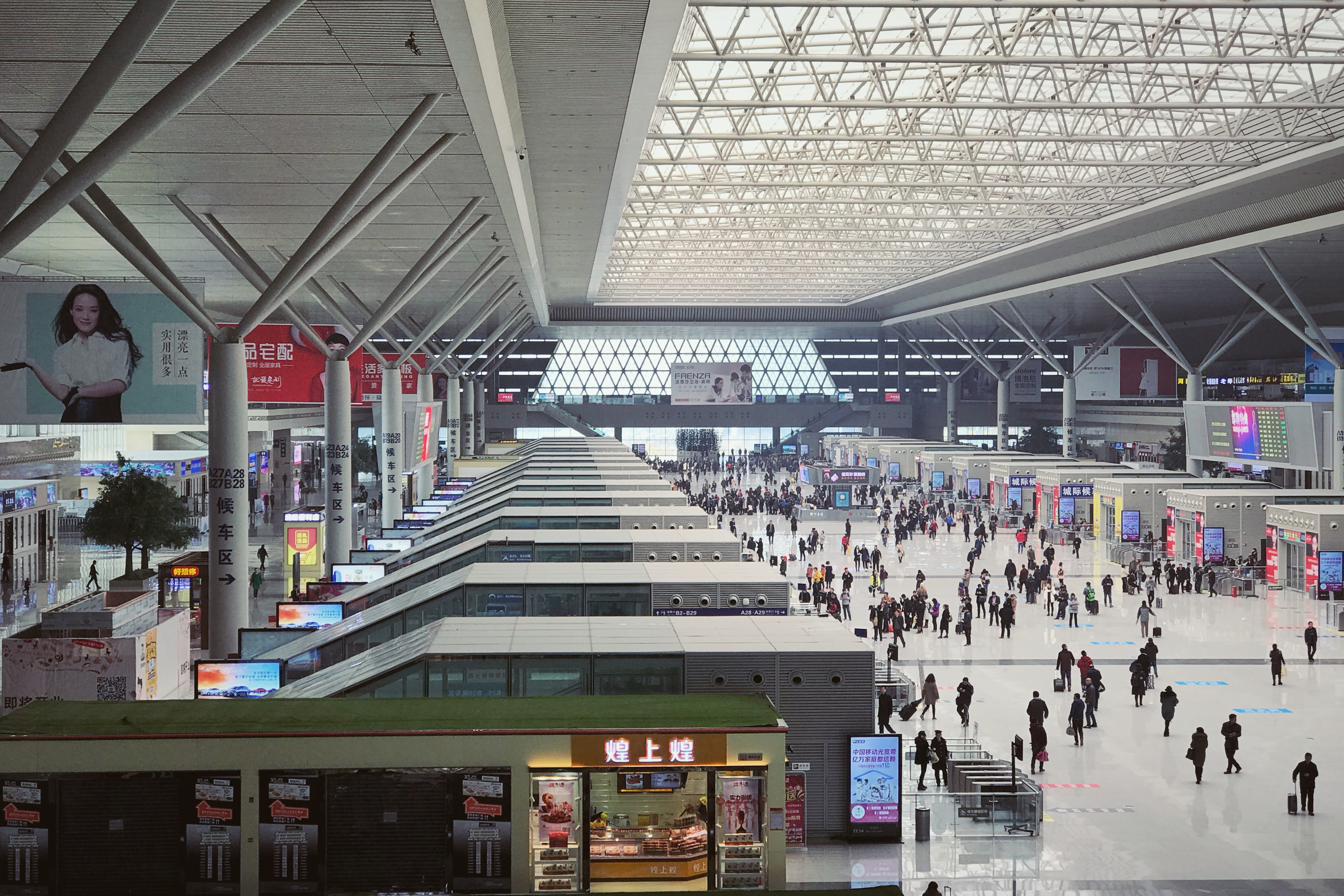
Concourse of Zhengzhou East railway station

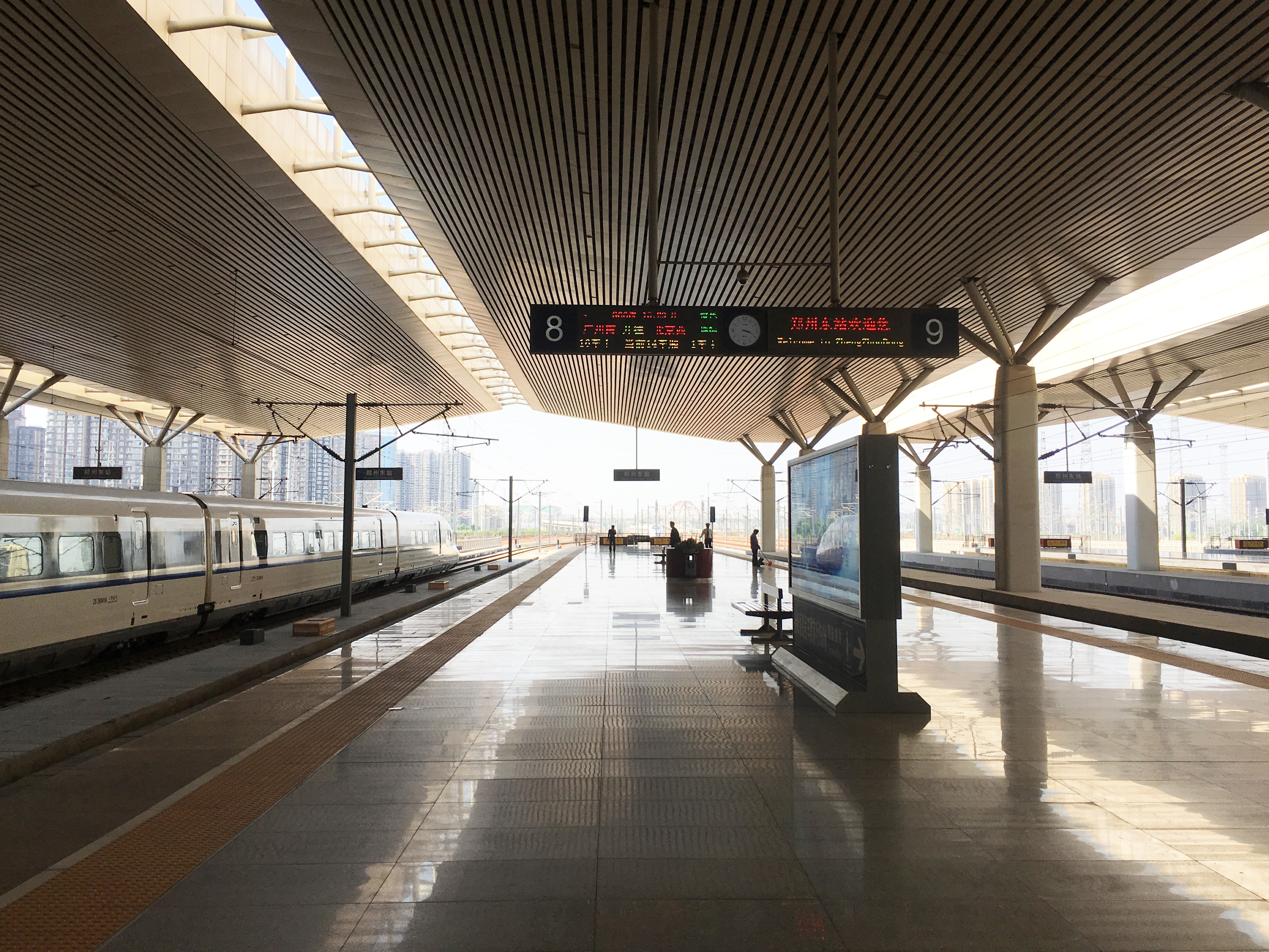
Platform of the station
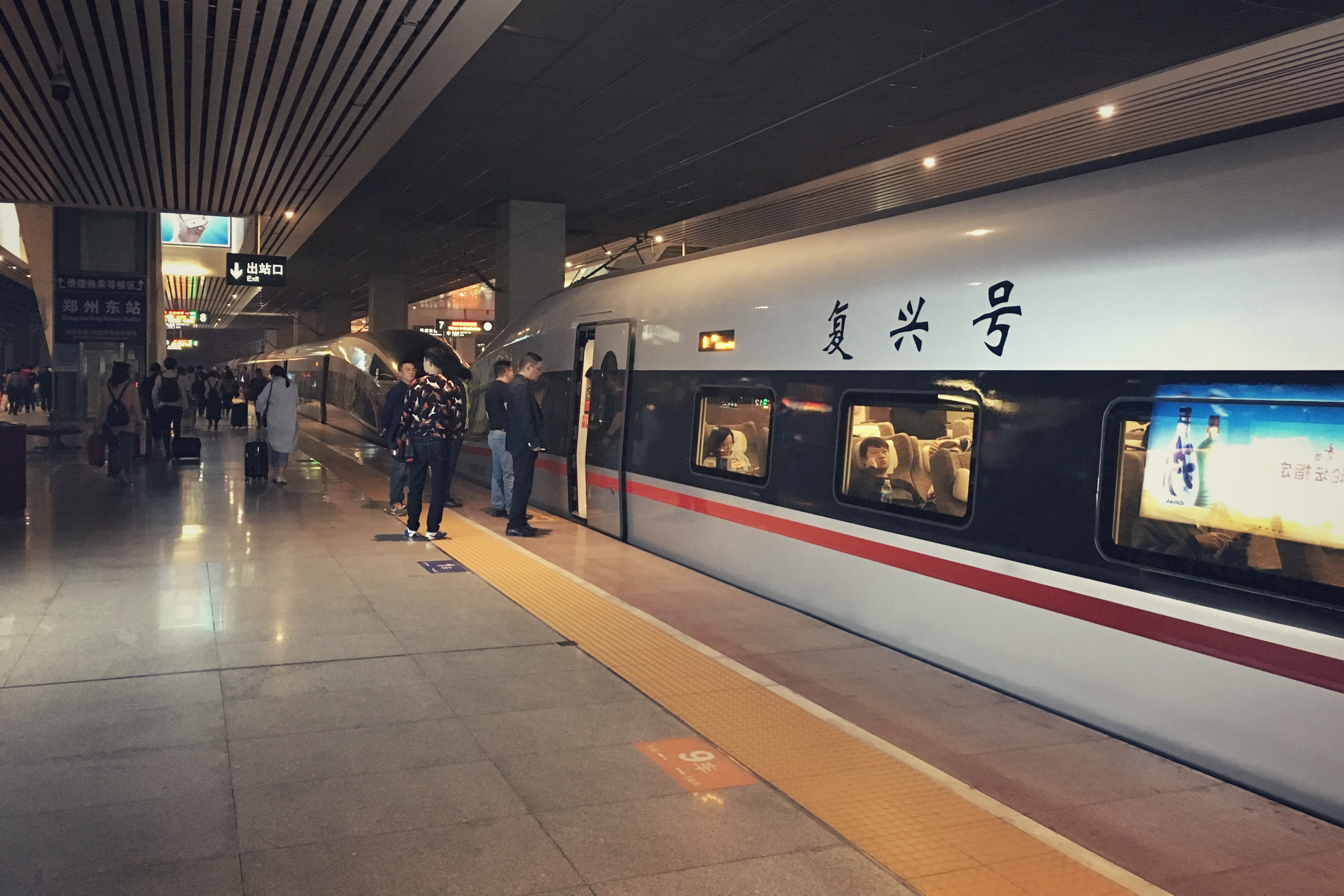
A CR400AF trainset on G80 service at the station

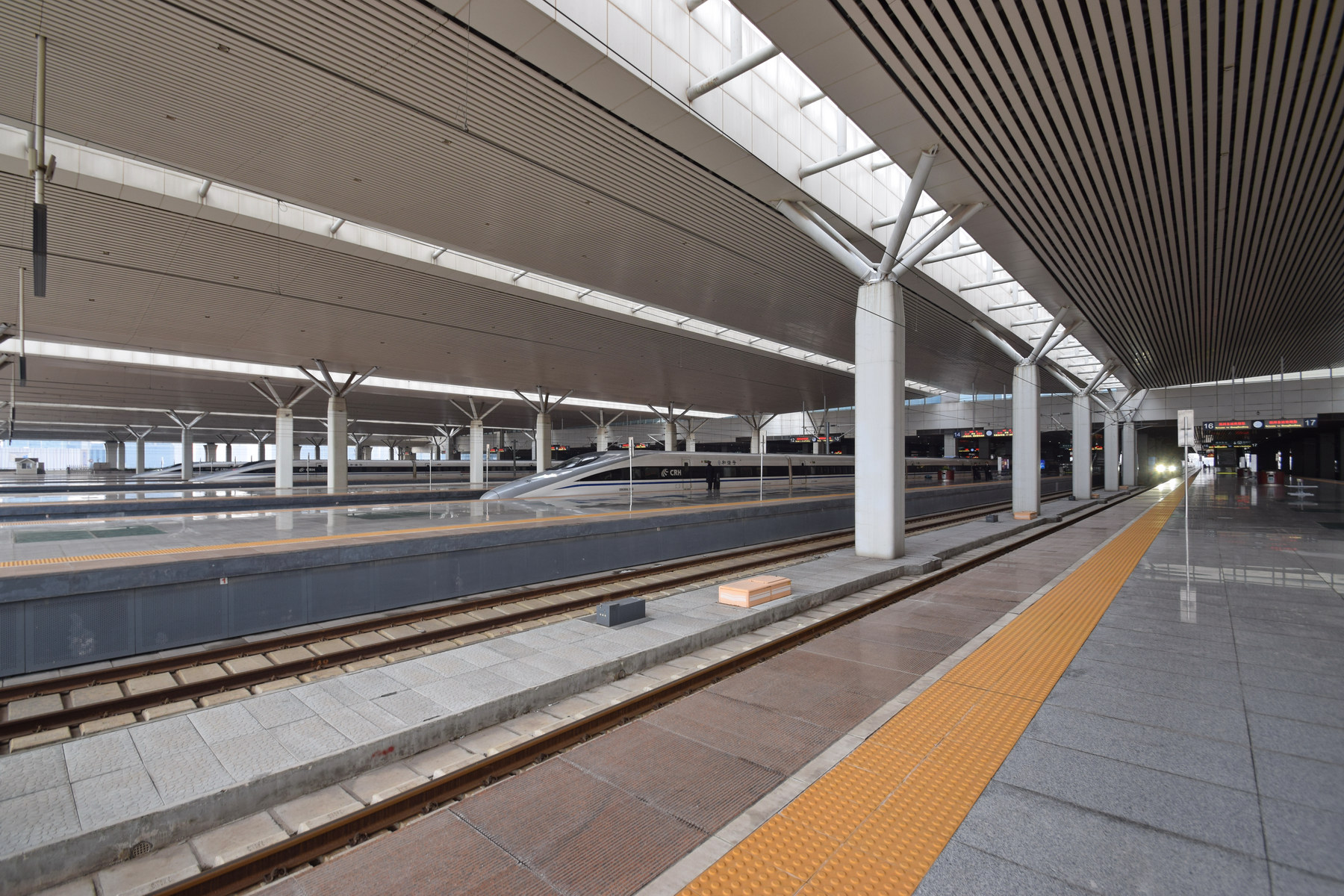
CRH380A EMUs at the station

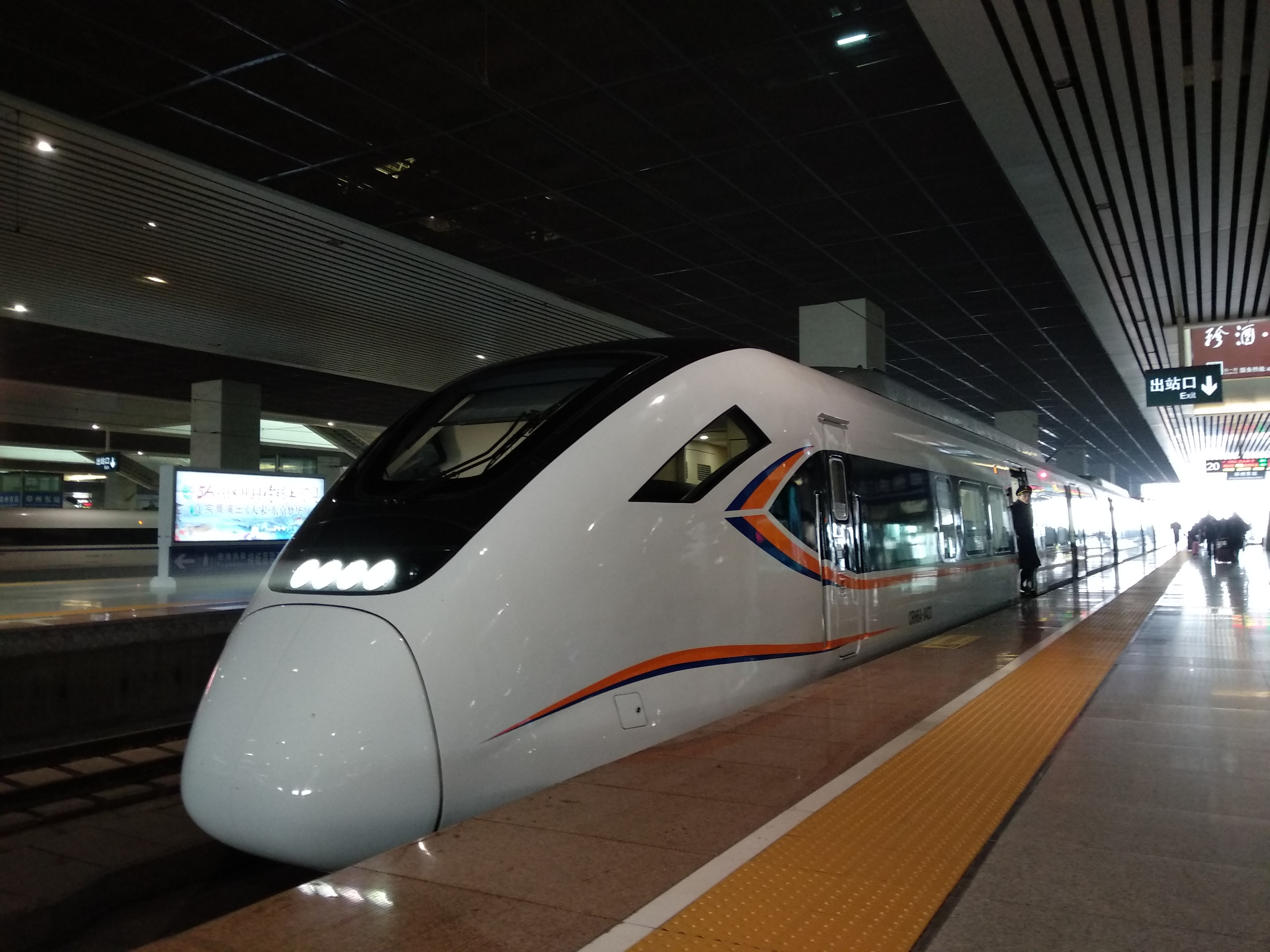
An intercity train (CRH6A EMU) at the station

== Metro station ==
Zhengzhoudong Railway Station 郑州东站
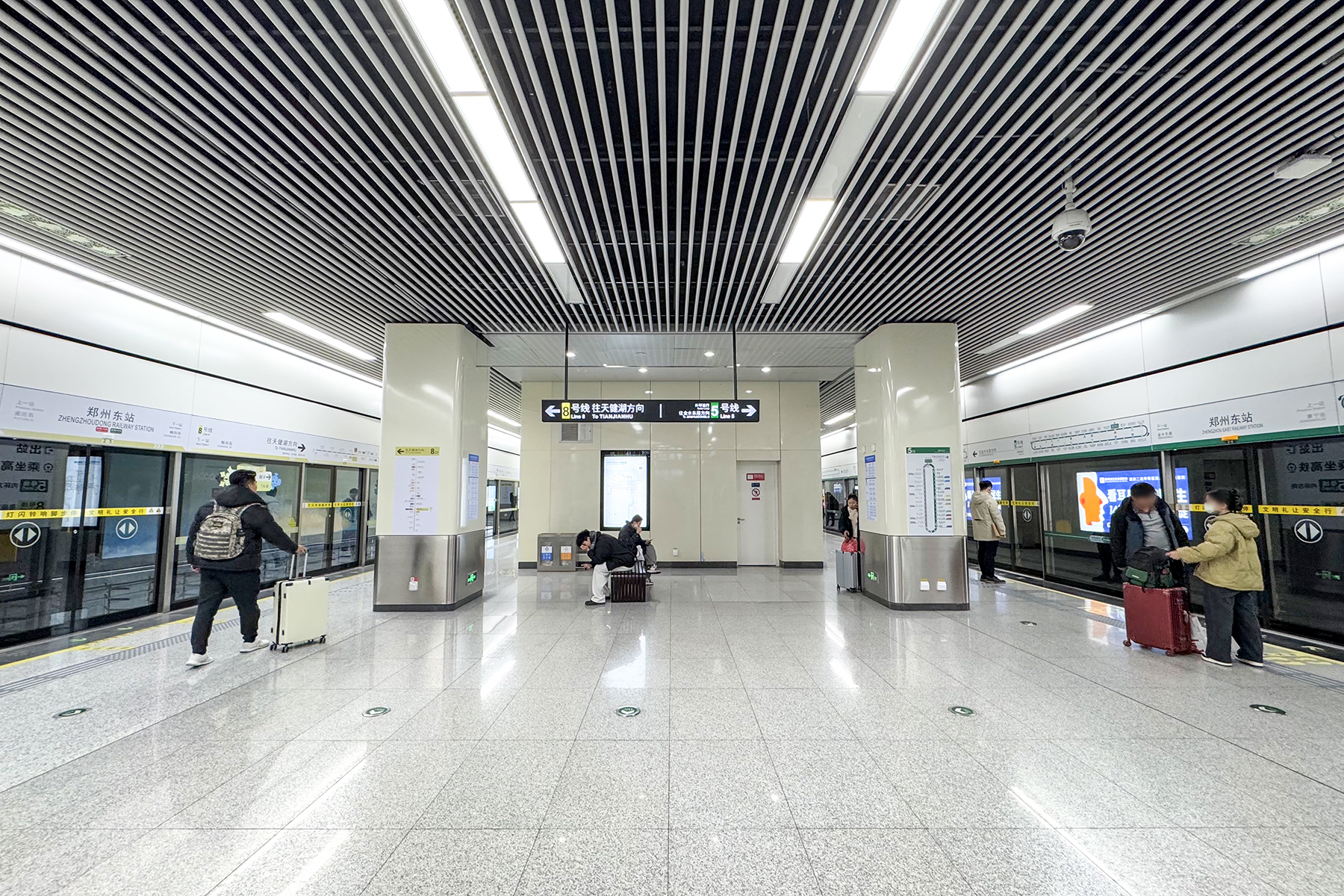
- Platforms for Line 5 counter-clockwise and Line 8 towards Tianjianhu

General information
- Location: Zhengzhou East railway station Zhengdong New Area, Zhengzhou; China
- System: Zhengzhou Metro rapid transit station
- Operator: Zhengzhou Metro
- Lines: Line 1; Line 5; Line 8
- Platforms: 6 (3 island platforms)
- Connections: Zhengzhou East railway station; Bus terminus

Construction
- Structure type: Underground
- Platform levels: 2

History
- Opened: 28 December 2013
- Former names: Zhengzhoudong Station (2012-2017); Zhengzhou East Railway Station (2017-2024)

Services
Preceding station	Zhengzhou Metro	Following station
Dongfengnanlu towards Henan University of Technology	Line 1	Boxuelu towards New Campus of Henan University
Kangningjie inner loop	Line 5	Jinshuidonglu outer loop
Changhejie towards Tianjianhu	Line 8	Putianxi towards Lumiao
Location

Zhengzhoudong Railway Station (simplified Chinese: 郑州东站; traditional Chinese: 鄭州東站), formerly known as Zhengzhoudong Station or Zhengzhou East Railway Station, is a metro station of Zhengzhou Metro. It is located beneath the high-speed railway station.

=== Station layout ===
The station has three levels underground with three island platforms (six platforms in total). Level B1 is for the station concourse, which houses the customer service center and ticket vending machines. The single island platform for Line 1 is on level B2. The dual island platforms for Line 5 and Line 8 are on the B3 level, and a cross-platform interchange between Line 5 and Line 8 is provided.

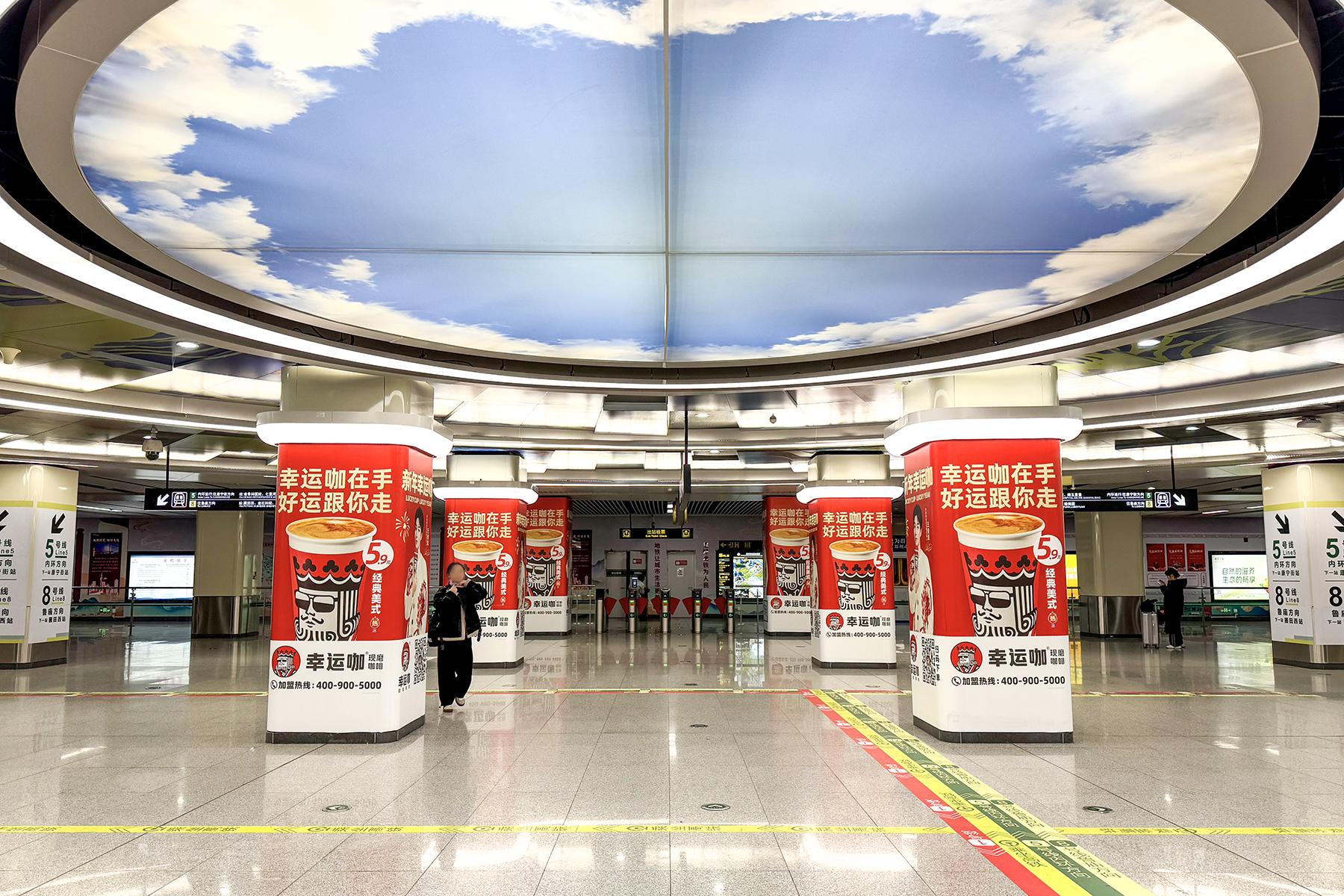
Concourse

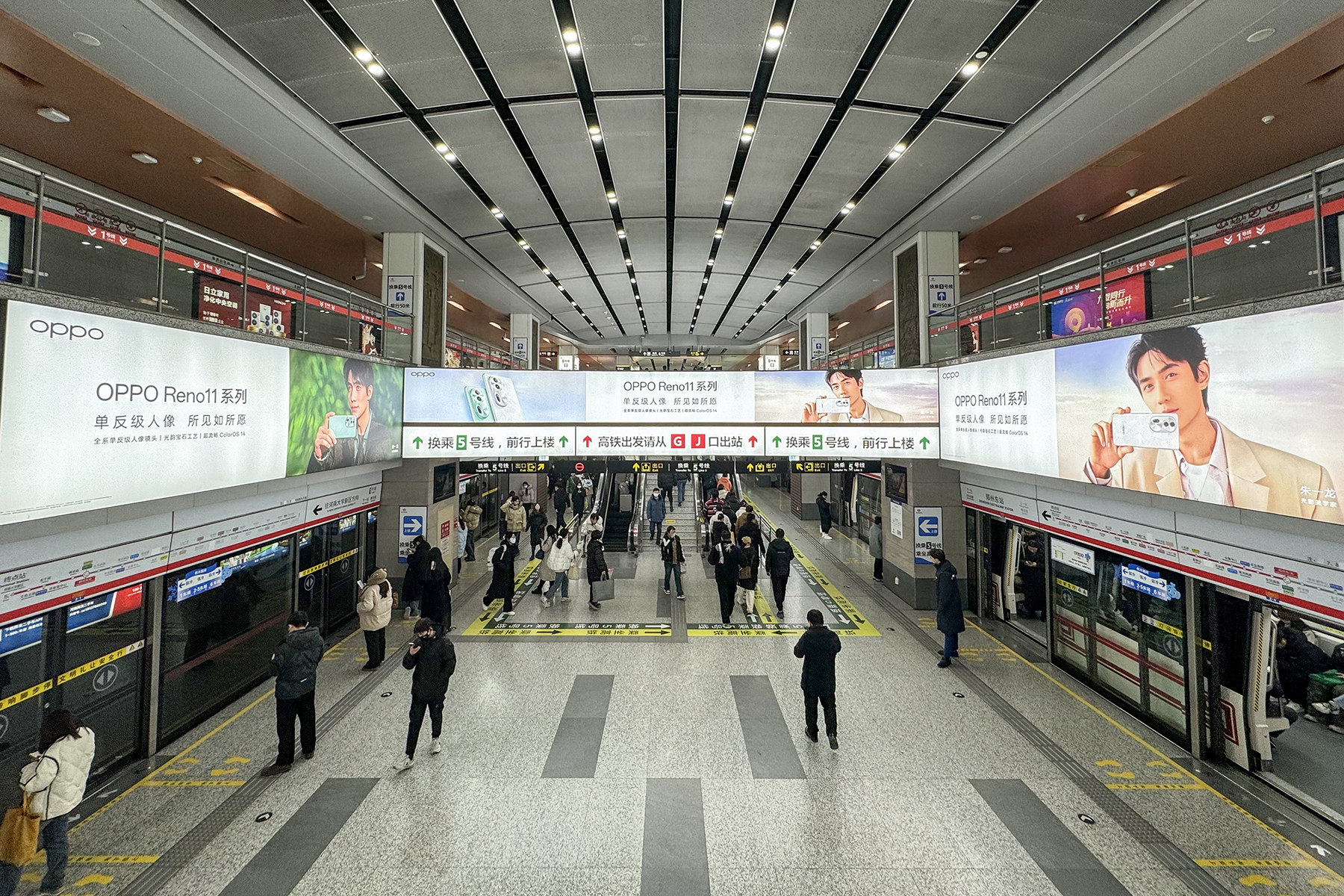
Platforms of Line 1

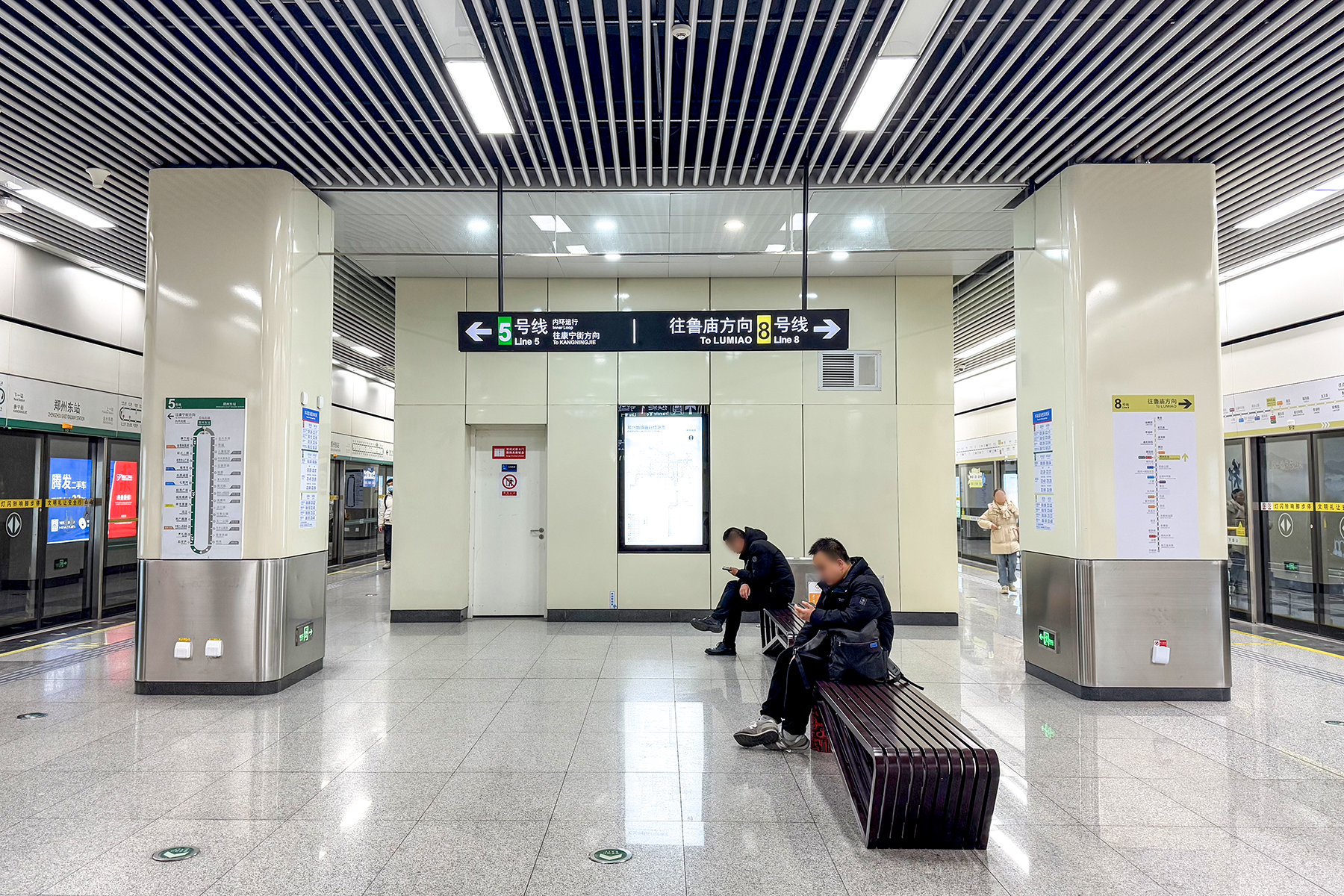
Platforms for Line 5 clockwise and Line 8 towards Lumiao

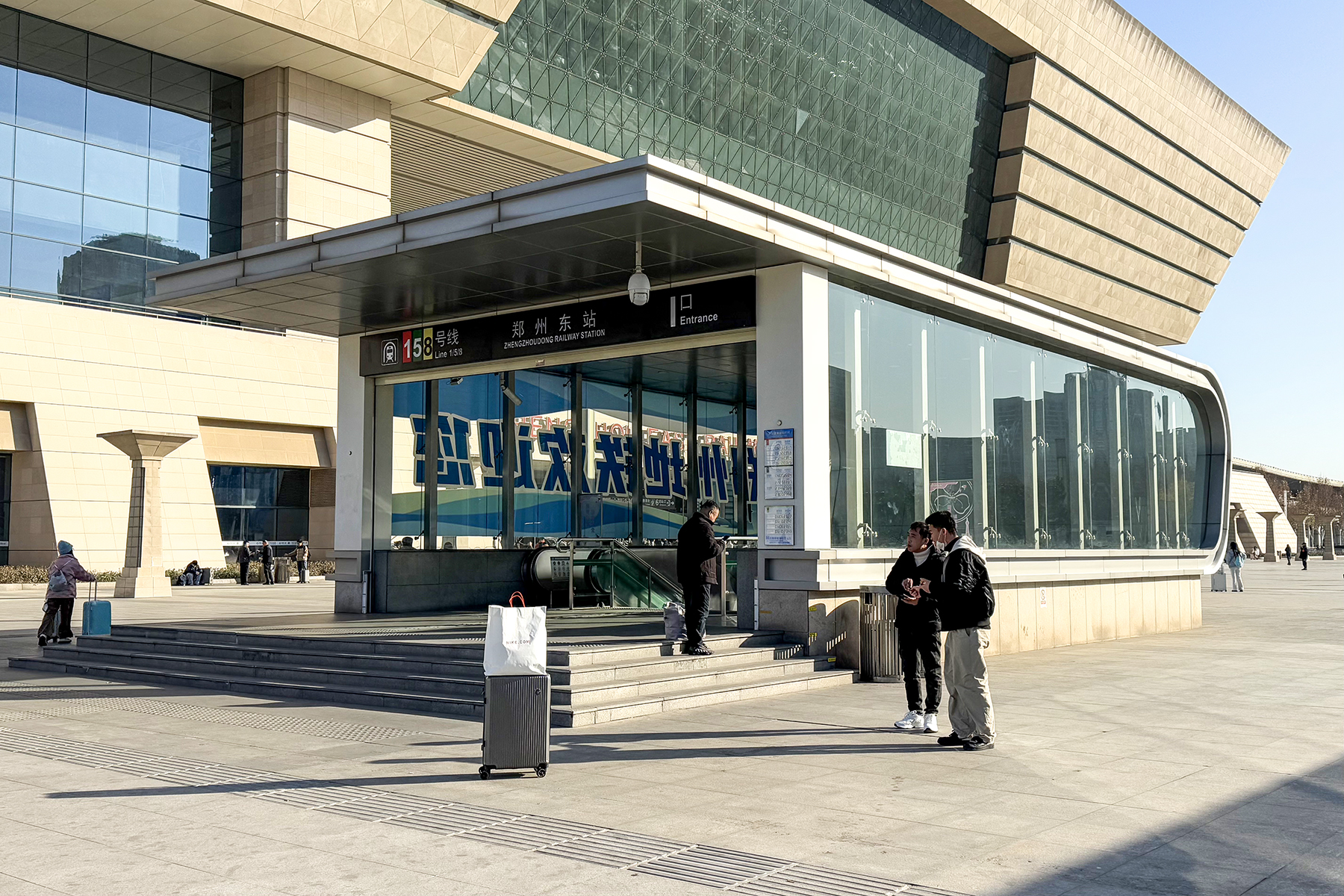
Entrance I

== See also ==
- Zhengzhou railway station
- Zhengzhou South railway station
- Zhengzhou Metro
