= Mengzhuang station =

Metro station in Zhengzhou, China

Mengzhuang 孟庄
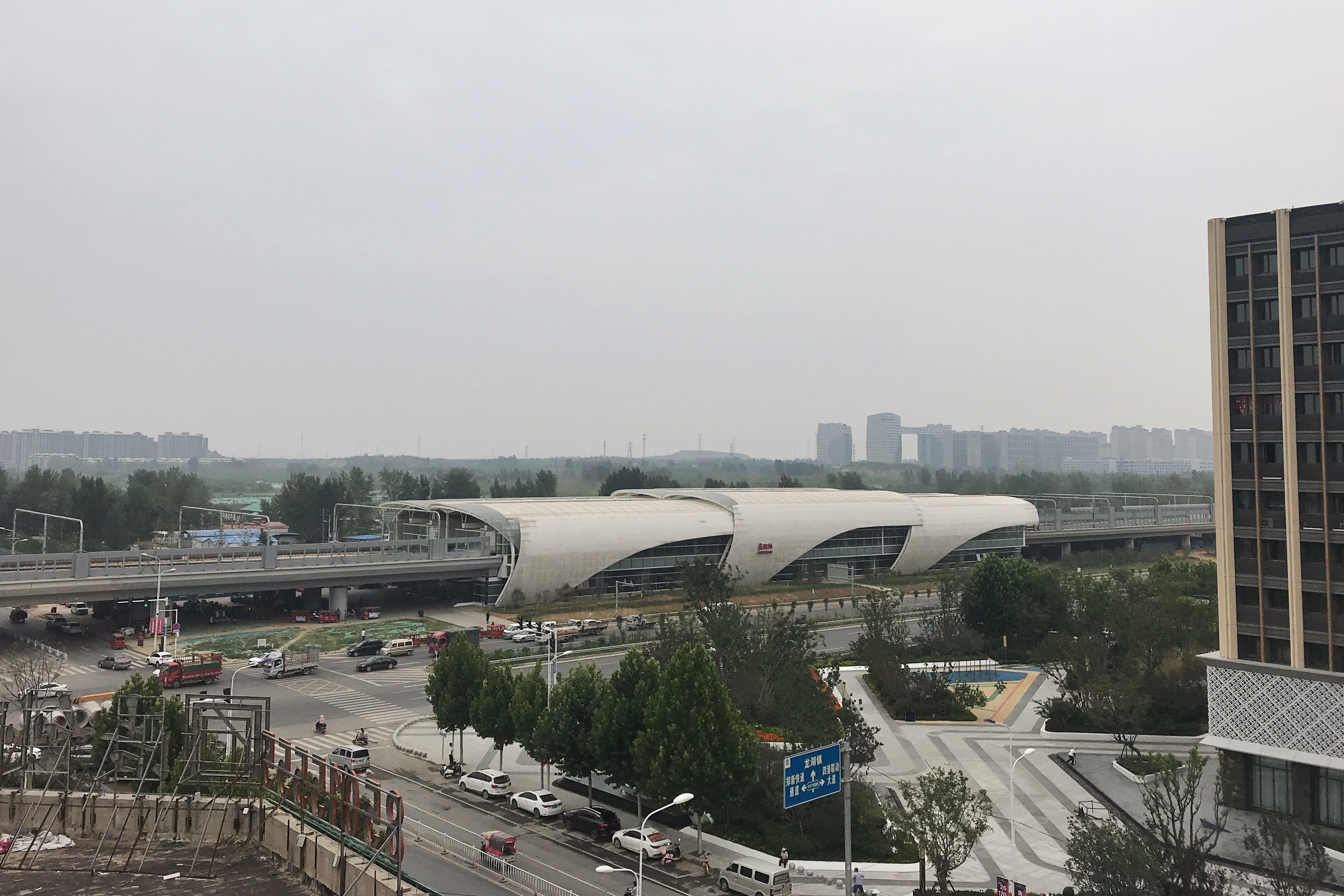

General information
- Location: Mengzhuang Town, Xinzheng, Zhengzhou; China
- Coordinates: 34.5870°N 113.8122°E
- System: Zhengzhou Metro rapid transit station
- Operator: Zhengzhou Metro
- Line: Chengjiao line
- Platforms: 4 (2 island platforms)

Construction
- Structure type: Elevated

Other information
- Station code: 244

History
- Opened: 12 January 2017

Services
Preceding station	Zhengzhou Metro	Following station
Hua'nancheng towards Jiahe	Chengjiao line through services via Line 2	Gangqu Bei towards Zhengzhou Hangkonggang Railway Station
Location
- Location within Zhengzhou

Mengzhuang (Chinese: 孟庄) is a metro station of Zhengzhou Metro Chengjiao line.

Although having the same name, this station is not close to the Mengzhuang railway station, a railway station on Zhengzhou-Xinzheng Airport intercity railway.

== Station layout ==
The station has two island platforms (four platform sides) and four tracks. The Platform 1 and 4 (southernmost and northernmost platforms) are for regular Chengjiao line services, while the Platform 2 and 3 are for back-to-depot or out-of-depot trains going to or from Mengzhuang depot. In rush hours on weekdays, platform 2 and 3 are also open for trains terminated at this station.

2F; Platforms	Platform 4	← Chengjiao line towards Jiahe (Hua'nancheng)
2F; Platforms	Island platform
2F; Platforms	Platform 3	← Chengjiao line towards Jiahe (Hua'nancheng)（In rush hours on weekdays）
2F; Platforms	Platform 2	For arrival only（In rush hours on weekdays）
2F; Platforms	Island platform
2F; Platforms	Platform 1	Chengjiao line towards Zhengzhou Hangkonggang Railway Station (Kangpinghu) →
G	Concourse	Customer services, vending machines, exits

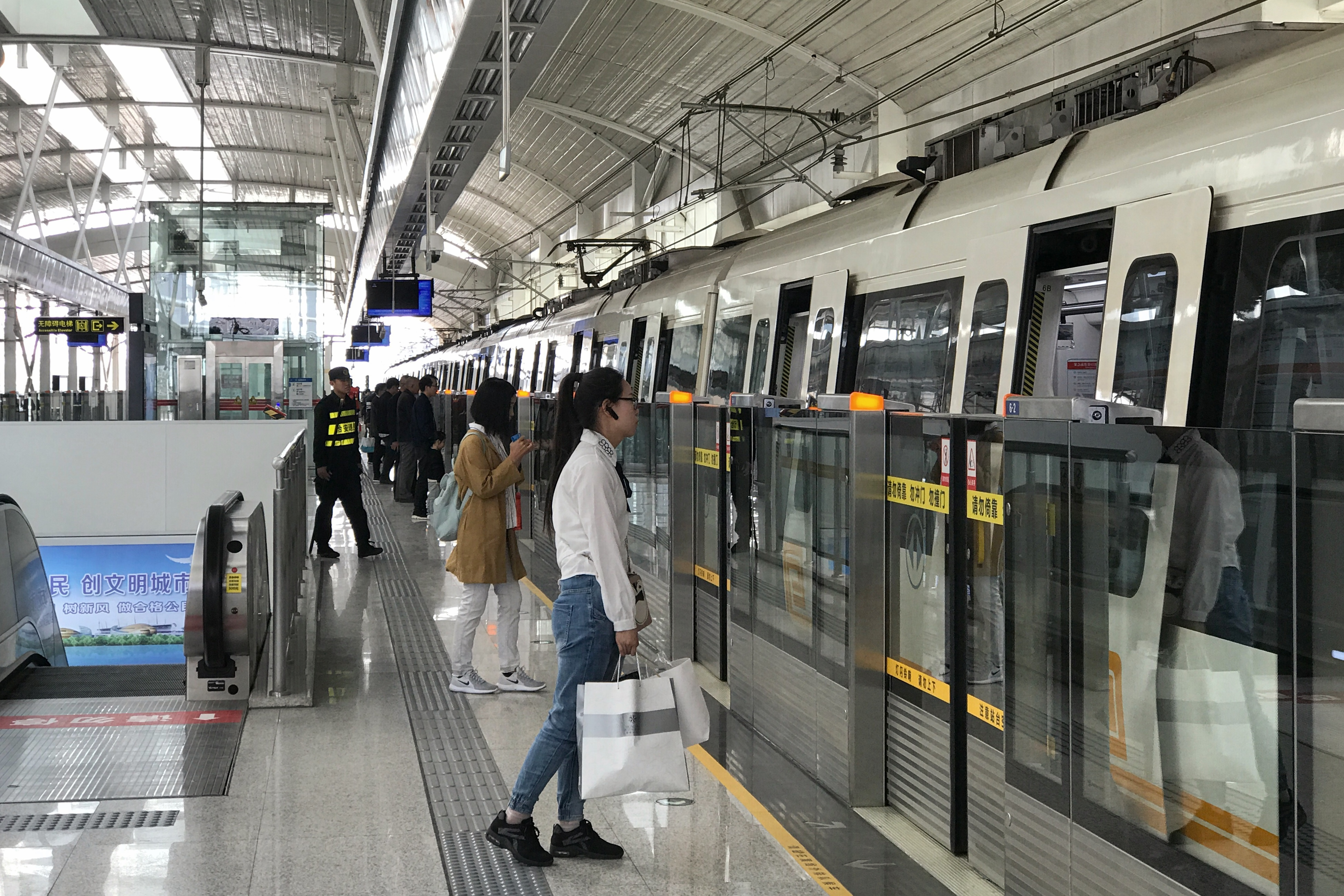
A train at Platform 1 of the station

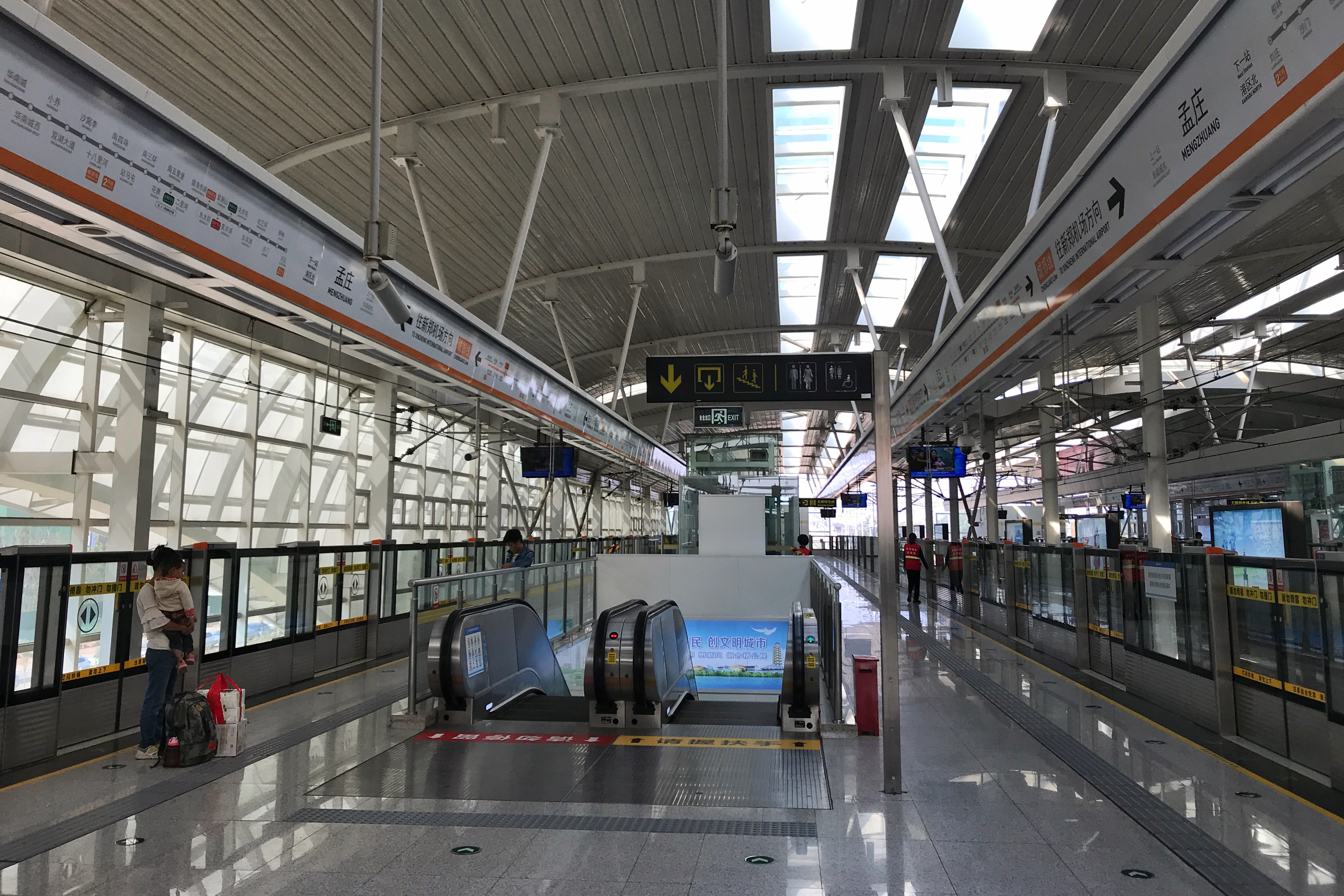
Platforms of the station

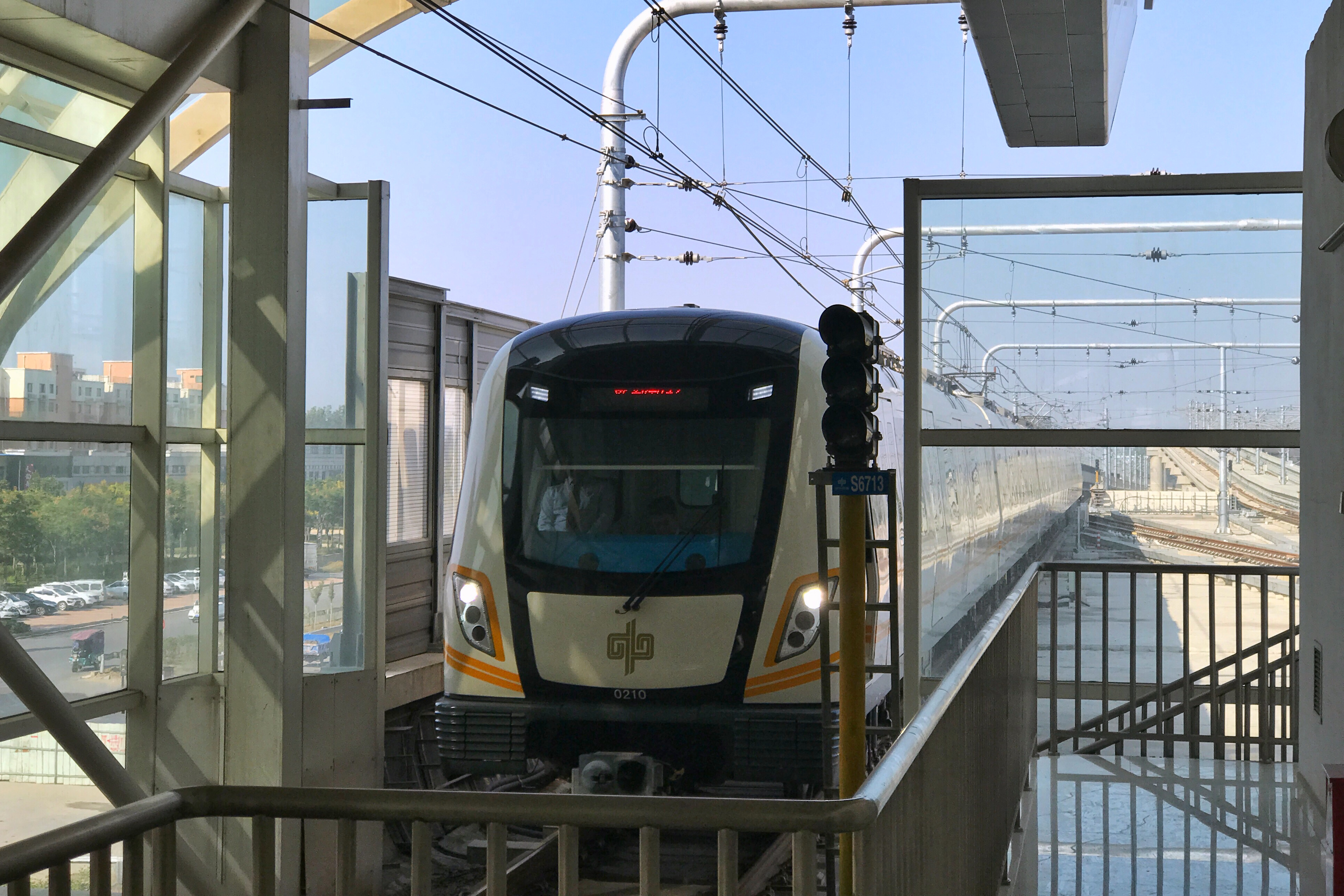
A train of Zhengzhou Metro Chengjiao line approaching the station

== Exits ==
Exit	Destination
Exit A	Mengxiang Road (east side)
Exit B	Mengxiang Road (east side)
