= Zhengxu line =

Metro line in Henan, China

- Zhengxu
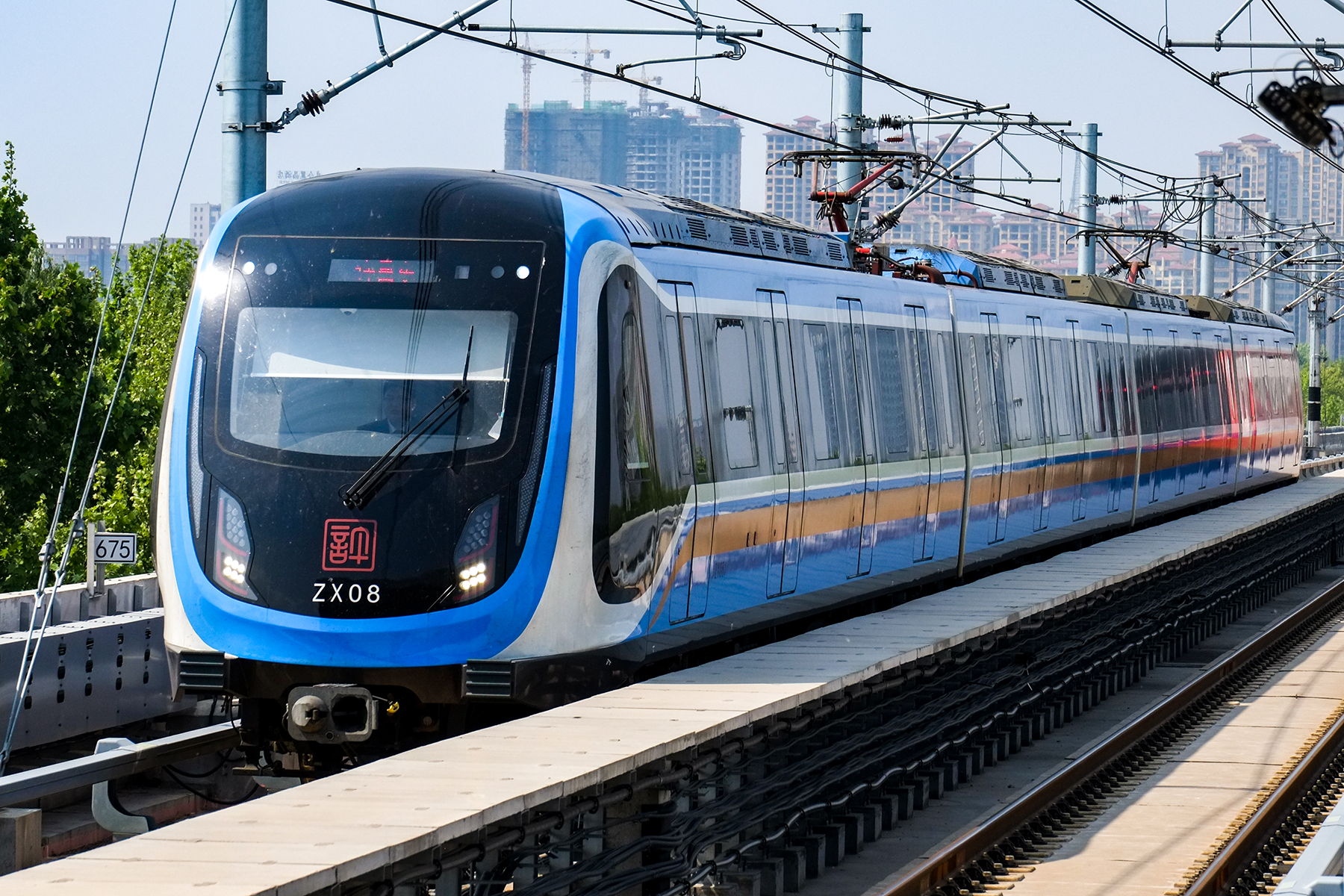
- A train of Zhengxu line

Overview
- Other names: Line S1; Zhengzhou-Xuchang Urban Railway; Zhengzhou Airport - Xuchang Intercity Railway (Project name); Line 17 of Zhengzhou Metro (Project name)
- Native name: 郑许线 郑许市域铁路
- Status: Operational
- Owner: Zhengzhou
- Locale: Zhengzhou and Xuchang, Henan Province, China
- Termini: Chang'an Lu Bei; Xuchangdong
- Stations: 26

Service
- Type: Rapid transit, Suburban railway, Airport rail link
- System: Zhengzhou Metro
- Operator(s): Zhengzhou Metro Group Corporation; Henan Zhengxu Rail Transit Co., Ltd (a joint venture between Zhengzhou Metro and Xuchang Construction Investment Co., Ltd)
- Depot(s): Gangqu Bei, Meizhuang
- Rolling stock: 4-car Type B

History
- Opened: 28 December 2023; 2 years ago

Technical
- Line length: 33.4 km (20.75 mi) (Zhengzhou section); 33.7 km (20.94 mi) (Xuchang section); 67.13 km (41.71 mi) (Total)
- Number of tracks: 2
- Character: Underground, elevated
- Track gauge: 1,435 mm (4 ft 8 1/2 in)
- Operating speed: 120 km/h (maximum)

The Zhengxu line of the Zhengzhou Metro, formerly known as Line 17 of Zhengzhou Metro during planning, is a rapid transit and intercity rail line connecting Zhengzhou and Xuchang in Henan Province. It is also named as Line S1 in Zhengzhou Metropolitan Area Rail Transit network. The line started service on 28 December 2023.

This is the first intercity/suburban metro line in Mainland China adopts GoA4 automation level connecting 2 cities.

== Stations ==
Station no.	Service route		Station name		Connections	Location	
Station no.	Local	Rapid	English	Chinese	Connections	Location	
1721	●	●	Chang'an Lu Bei	长安路北		Zhongmu	Zhengzhou
1723	●	●	Gangqu Bei	港区北	Chengjiao	Xinzheng	Zhengzhou
1725	●	｜	Wenti Zhongxin	文体中心		Xinzheng	Zhengzhou
1727	●	｜	Zaoyuan	枣园		Xinzheng	Zhengzhou
1729	●	｜	Aoxiang Lu	翱翔路		Xinzheng	Zhengzhou
1731	●	｜	Chang'an Lu Nan	长安路南		Xinzheng	Zhengzhou
1733	●	●	Xinzheng International Airport	新郑机场	Chengjiao (OSI); CGO ZXA EZF	Xinzheng	Zhengzhou
1735	●	｜	Zunda Lu	遵大路		Xinzheng	Zhengzhou
1737	●	｜	Yuanlinggucheng Xi	苑陵故城西		Xinzheng	Zhengzhou
1739	●	｜	Xunmei Lu	洵美路		Xinzheng	Zhengzhou
1741	●	｜	Longwang	龙王		Xinzheng	Zhengzhou
1743	●	●	Longwang Nan	龙王南		Xinzheng	Zhengzhou
1745	●	｜	Shuanghehu Bei	双鹤湖北		Xinzheng	Zhengzhou
1747	●	｜	Shuanghehu	双鹤湖		Xinzheng	Zhengzhou
1749	●	●	Shuanghehu Nan	双鹤湖南		Xinzheng	Zhengzhou
1751	●	｜	Baqian	八千		Xinzheng	Zhengzhou
1753	●	｜	Shuangmiaoli	双庙李		Changge	Xuchang
1755	●	｜	Dazhou	大周		Changge	Xuchang
1757	●	●	Yingchuan Lu	颍川路		Changge	Xuchang
1759	●	●	Getianyuan	葛天源		Changge	Xuchang
1761	●	｜	Yonghe Lu	永和路		Changge	Xuchang
1763	●	｜	Nongda Lu	农大路		Jian'an	Xuchang
1765	●	｜	Xuchang Sports Center	体育中心		Jian'an	Xuchang
1767	●	｜	Dianqigu	电气谷		Jian'an	Xuchang
1769	●	｜	Furonghu	芙蓉湖		Jian'an	Xuchang
1771	●	｜	Luminghu	鹿鸣湖		Jian'an	Xuchang
1773	●	●	Xuchangdong	许昌东站	Xuchangdong Railway Station	Jian'an	Xuchang
