= Zhongyuan International Convention and Exhibition Center =

Building in Zhengzhou, China

- 中原国际会展中心
- Interactive map of Zhongyuan International Convention and Exhibition Center
- Address: Southeast of the intersection of Yingbin Avenue and Binhe East Road, Airport Port Area, Zhengzhou City, Henan Province
- Location: Zhengzhou Airport Economy Zone, Zhengzhou City, Henan Province, China
- Coordinates: 34.4978°N 113.9135°E
- Owner: Zhengzhou Airport Port Science and Technology Innovation Investment Group Co., Ltd.
- Operator: Zhengzhou International Convention and Exhibition Center Co., Ltd.

Construction
- Opened: October 27, 2023
- Cost: 15.5 billion RMB
- Architect: Gerkan, Marg and Partners
- Main contractors: China Railway Seventh Group (Phase I, Section II), China Construction Second Engineering Bureau Co., Ltd.

Zhongyuan International Convention and Exhibition Center, located in Zhengzhou Airport Economy Zone, Zhengzhou City, Henan Province, People's Republic of China, is a large-scale convention and exhibition building. The center is adjacent to Zhengzhou Airport Port Station and about 6 kilometers away from Xinzheng Airport. The project plans for a total area of approximately 2,450 mu, with a total construction area exceeding 1 million square meters and a total investment of 15.5 billion RMB. The total indoor exhibition area exceeds 400,000 square meters.

== History ==
The Zhongyuan International Convention and Exhibition Center is located in the area of Baidian (皛店) Village, Zhengzhou Airport Port Area, which has historical relics dating back over 3,000 years. The project was designed by Gerkan, Marg and Partners and constructed in two phases. Phase I includes 16 exhibition halls arranged in a symmetrical layout.

On October 27, 2023, the Zhongyuan International Convention and Exhibition Center held its opening ceremony, with its first event being the 2023 World Robot Games Championships (Zhengzhou). In April 2025, the steel structure of Phase II was topped out; in the same month, the 8 exhibition halls of Phase I, Section II were completed. On July 17, 2025, all 16 exhibition halls of Phase I became fully operational. In September 2025, the 3rd National Vocational Skills Competition will be held at this center.

== Architecture ==
=== Design ===
The architectural design references the characteristics of the local ancient village site of Baidian (皛店). The entrance halls feature a sloped roof with high ridges, while the exhibition halls are connected by corridors, with a layout mimicking the road structure of ancient villages.

=== Structure and Technology ===
The venue adopts a single-unit warehouse-style exhibition hall design, utilizing arched spatial steel frames and spatial truss beam structures. The maximum area of a single exhibition hall in Phase I is 18,000 square meters, with no internal columns. The steel structure usage for the 8 exhibition halls in Phase I, Section II is approximately 20,000 tons, with a maximum single-truss weight of 380 tons for the main trusses. Sunken green spaces are installed outdoors for rainwater collection and storage.

== Facilities and Scale ==
The Zhongyuan International Convention and Exhibition Center's functions include exhibitions, conferences, catering, accommodation, and events. Phase I includes 16 exhibition halls, with 128,000 square meters of indoor exhibition space and 100,000 square meters of outdoor exhibition space. According to the plan, upon full completion, there will be 32 exhibition halls, 4 entrance halls, 1 international conference center, along with an adjacent InterContinental hotel (nearly 300 rooms), a 127,000 square meter conference center, 200,000 square meters of outdoor exhibition space, and 20,000 parking spaces.

The exhibition halls can be used independently or in combination via connecting corridors. The two multifunctional exhibition halls at the north end of Phase I have a ceiling height of 14 meters and can host conferences for 5,000 people or banquets for 3,000 people. Hotels and commercial facilities are planned for the surrounding area.

== Operations and Events ==
The Zhongyuan International Convention and Exhibition Center and the Zhengzhou International Convention and Exhibition Center are under unified operation and management. Since its opening in 2023, events held include the World Robot Games Championships, the Zhengzhou ACC Animation Exhibition, the China-Europe Railway Express Expo, the Zhengzhou Logistics Expo, etc. The first event after Phase I became fully operational in July 2025 was the 10th Zhengzhou Hot Pot Ingredients and Supplies Exhibition, featuring over 4,000 participating brands.

== Transportation ==
The center is located in the Zhengzhou Airport Economy Zone, adjacent to Zhengzhou Hangkonggang railway station, about 6 kilometers from Zhengzhou-Xinzheng International Airport, and about 10 kilometers from the Zhengzhou International Land Port. The Zhengzhou Metro Chengjiao Line has a nearby station.
