= Nancao railway station =

Railway station in Zhengzhou, China

Nancao 南曹
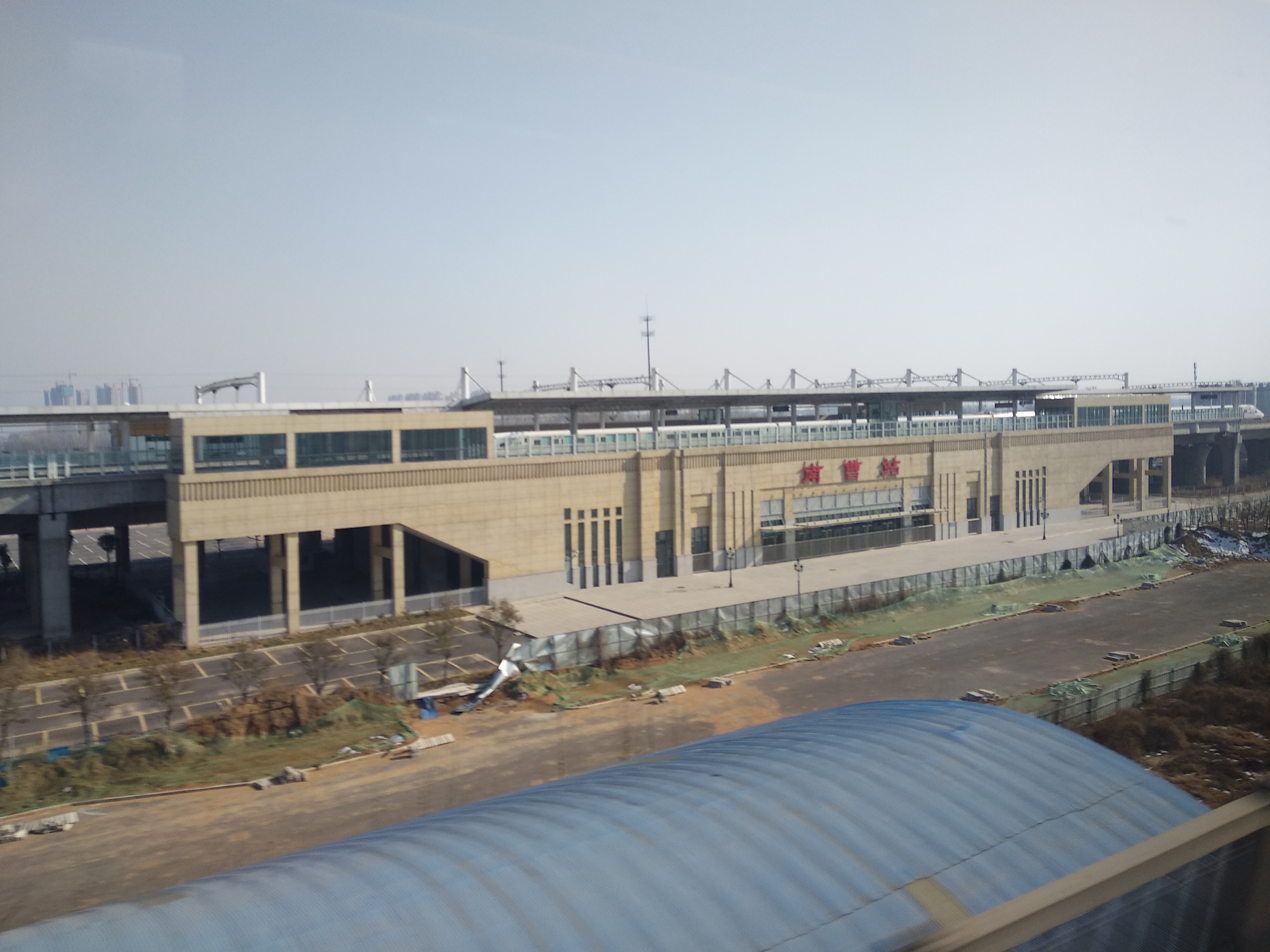

General information
- Location: Nancao, Guancheng Hui District, Zhengzhou, Henan; China
- Coordinates: 34.6779°N 113.7906°E
- Operator: CR Zhengzhou
- Line: Zhengzhou–Xinzheng Airport intercity railway
- Platforms: 2
- Tracks: 4
- Connections: Bus

Other information
- Station code: 65701 (TMIS code); NEF (telegraph code); NCA (Pinyin code)
- Classification: Class 3 station

History
- Opened: 31 December 2015; 28 September 2024; 23 months ago (Reopened)
- Closed: 25 July 2017

Services
| Preceding station | China Railway High-speed | Following station |
|---|---|---|
| Zhengzhou East Terminus | Zhengzhou–Xinzheng Airport intercity railway | Mengzhuang towards Zhengzhou Hangkonggang |
Location
- Location within Zhengzhou Location within Henan

Nancao railway station (Chinese: 南曹站) is a railway station on the Zhengzhou–Xinzheng Airport Intercity Railway in Zhengzhou, Henan, China. The station originally opened on 31 December 2015, but closed on 25 July 2017. This railway station, along with Mengzhuang station, was reopened on September 28, 2024.

== Station layout ==
The station is an elevated station with 2 side platforms and 4 tracks. The platforms are on the upper level while the station concourse and the waiting area are on the ground level.

| 2F; Platforms | Side platform |
| 2F; Platforms | Platform 2 | Zhengzhou–Xinzheng Airport intercity railway towards Xinzheng Airport (Mengzhuang) → |
| 2F; Platforms | Through track | Zhengzhou–Xinzheng Airport intercity railway → |
| 2F; Platforms | Through track | ← Zhengzhou–Xinzheng Airport intercity railway |
| 2F; Platforms | Platform 1 | ← Zhengzhou–Xinzheng Airport intercity railway towards Zhengzhou East (Terminus) |
| 2F; Platforms | Side platform |
| G | Concourse | Waiting area, ticket vending machines, exits |

== Station closure & re-opening ==
According to CNA, the station was abandoned due to its remote location and low passenger patronage. CNA also found that while the station's facilities remain intact, such as escalators, security scanners and platforms, it described station doors as being shut "all day" and cobwebs clinging to corners of the station.

The station was re-opened on the 28th of September 2024 to 'serve the flow of tourists, scenic spots, transfers and commuters'. Additionally, services on the Zhengji line were increased, allowing passengers to reach Zhengzhou East in less than 15 minutes.
