= Zhongmu railway station =

Railway station in Zhengzhou, China

Zhongmu 中牟
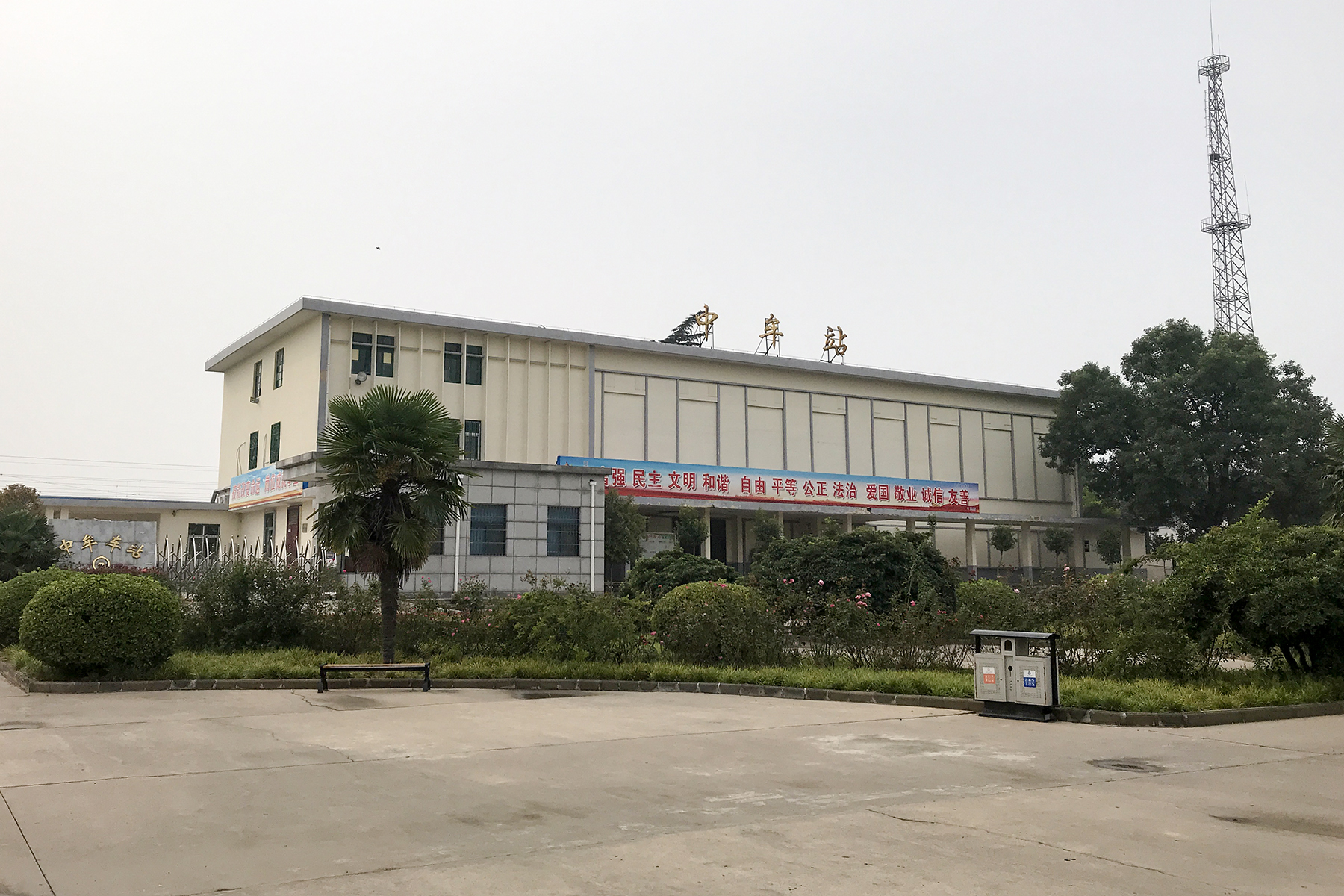
- Zhongmu railway station

General information
- Location: Zhongmu County, Zhengzhou, Henan; China
- Coordinates: 34.7101°N 114.0263°E
- Operator: CR Zhengzhou
- Line: Longhai Railway

Other information
- Station code: 38792 (TMIS code); ZGF (telegraph code); ZMU (Pinyin code)

History
- Opened: 1910
Location
- Location within Zhengzhou Location within Henan Location within China

Zhongmu railway station (Chinese: 中牟站) is a railway station of Longhai railway located in Zhongmu County, Zhengzhou, Henan, China.

The station is currently out of passenger services.

== History ==
The station was opened in 1910.
