= MZH =

MZH or mzh may refer to:

- MZH, the IATA code for Amasya Merzifon Airport, Turkey
- MZH, the National Rail station code for Maze Hill railway station, London
- MZH, the Pinyin code for Mengzhuang railway station, Zhengzhou, Henan, China
- mzh, the ISO 639-3 code for Wichí Lhamtés Güisnay, Argentina
