= Mengzhuang railway station =

Railway station in Zhengzhou, China

Mengzhuang 孟庄
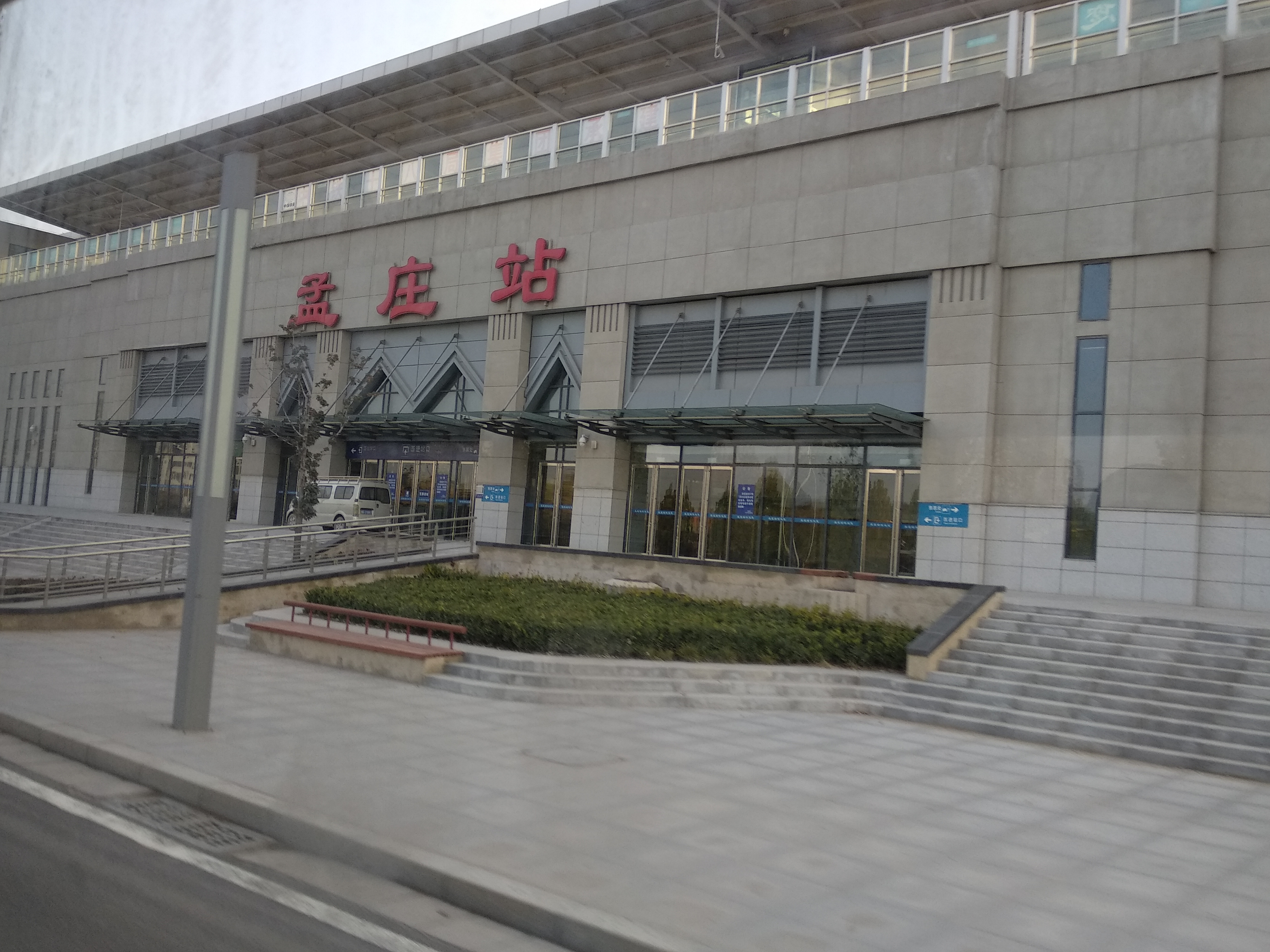

General information
- Location: Huaxia Avenue; Zhengzhou Airport Economy Zone, Zhengzhou, Henan; China
- Coordinates: 34.5870°N 113.8368°E
- Operator: CR Zhengzhou
- Line: Zhengzhou–Xinzheng Airport intercity railway
- Platforms: 2
- Tracks: 2
- Connections: Gangqu Bei; Bus terminus

Other information
- Station code: 65703 (TMIS code); MZF (telegraph code); MZH (Pinyin code)
- Classification: Class 3 station

History
- Opened: 31 December 2015

Services
Preceding station	China Railway High-speed	Following station
Nancao towards Zhengzhou East	Zhengzhou–Xinzheng Airport intercity railway	Xinzheng Airport towards Zhengzhou Hangkonggang
Location
- Location within Zhengzhou Location within Henan

Mengzhuang railway station (Chinese: 孟庄站) is a railway station on the Zhengzhou–Xinzheng Airport intercity railway in Zhengzhou, Henan, China. The railway station opened on 31 December 2015, but closed on 25 July 2017. Along with Nancao station, the station was re-opened on the 28th of September 2024.

The railway station shares the same name with Mengzhuang station on Zhengzhou Metro Chengjiao line, but is located about 1.7 kilometres (1.1 mi) east of the metro station and is not interchangeable. The railway station is located near Gangqu Bei station also on Chengjiao line.

== Station closure & re-opening ==
According to CNA, the station was abandoned due to its remote location and low passenger patronage. CNA also found that while the station's facilities remain intact, such as escalators, security scanners and platforms, it described station doors as being shut "all day" and cobwebs clinging to corners of the station.

The station was re-opened on the 28th of September 2024 to 'serve the flow of tourists, scenic spots, transfers and commuters'. Additionally, services on the Zhengji line were increased, allowing passengers to reach Zhengzhou East in less than 15 minutes.
