= Xinzheng International Airport station =

Metro station in Zhengzhou, China

Xinzheng International Airport 新郑机场
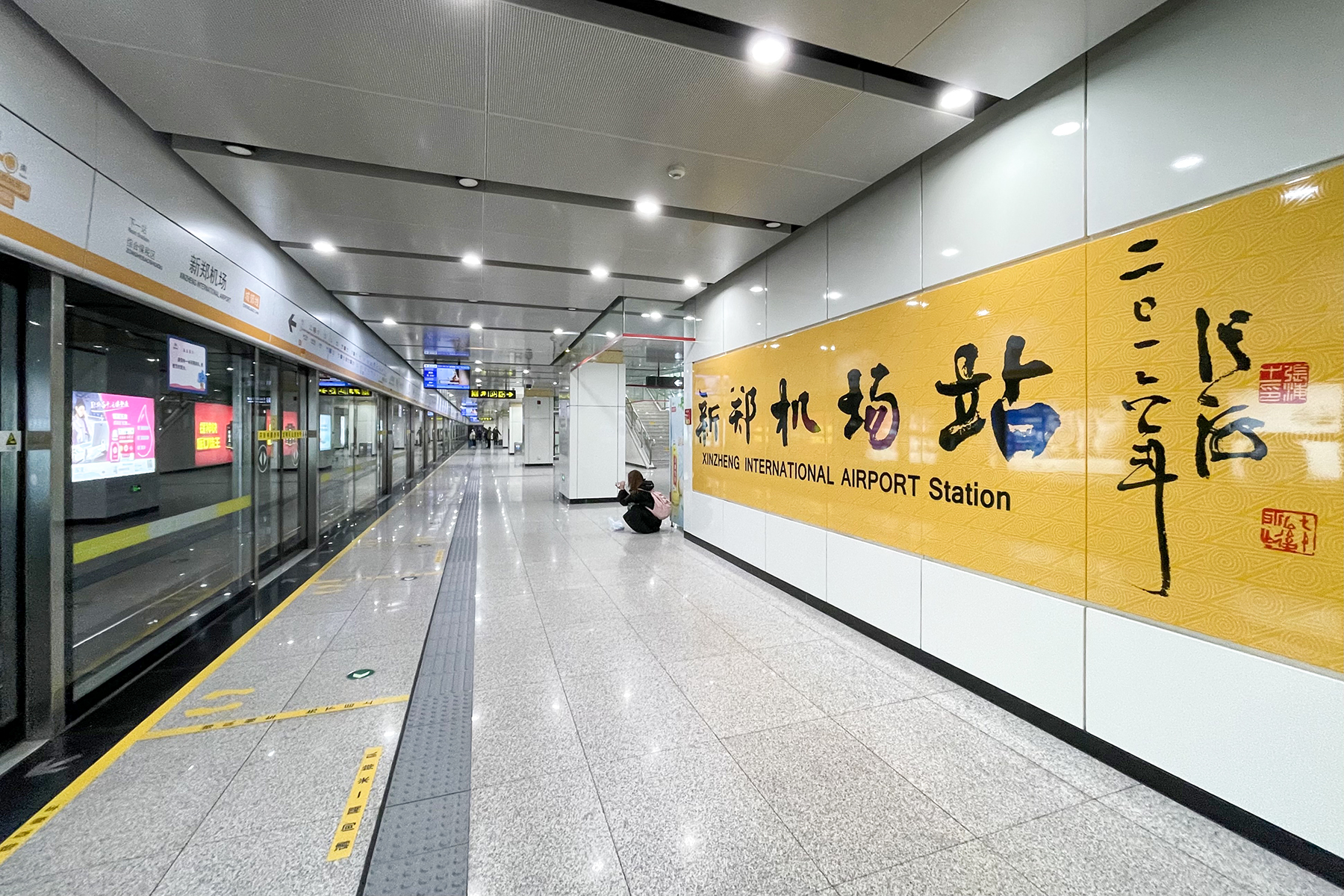
- Platforms of Chengjiao line

General information
- Location: B2 floor on GTC of Xinzheng International Airport; Zhengzhou Airport Economy Zone, Zhengzhou, Henan; China
- Coordinates: 34.5277°N 113.8464°E
- System: Zhengzhou Metro rapid transit station
- Operator: Zhengzhou Metro
- Lines: Chengjiao line; Zhengxu line
- Platforms: 2 (1 island platform)
- Connections: Zhengzhou Xinzheng International Airport; Xinzheng Airport railway station; Bus terminal

Construction
- Structure type: Underground

Other information
- Station code: 250

History
- Opened: 12 January 2017 (Chengjiao line); 28 December 2022 (Zhengxu line)

Services
Preceding station	Zhengzhou Metro	Following station
Zonghebaoshuiqu towards Jiahe	Chengjiao line	Jichang Dong towards Zhengzhou Hangkonggang Railway Station
Location
- Location within Zhengzhou

Xinzheng International Airport (Chinese: 新郑机场) is a metro station on Chengjiao line and Zhengxu line of Zhengzhou Metro. The station is located with the ground traffic center (GTC) of Zhengzhou Xinzheng International Airport and provides airport rail link services to downtown Zhengzhou.

The roof of the concourse is wave-shaped, resembling the roof of the Terminal 1 of Zhengzhou Xinzheng International Airport.

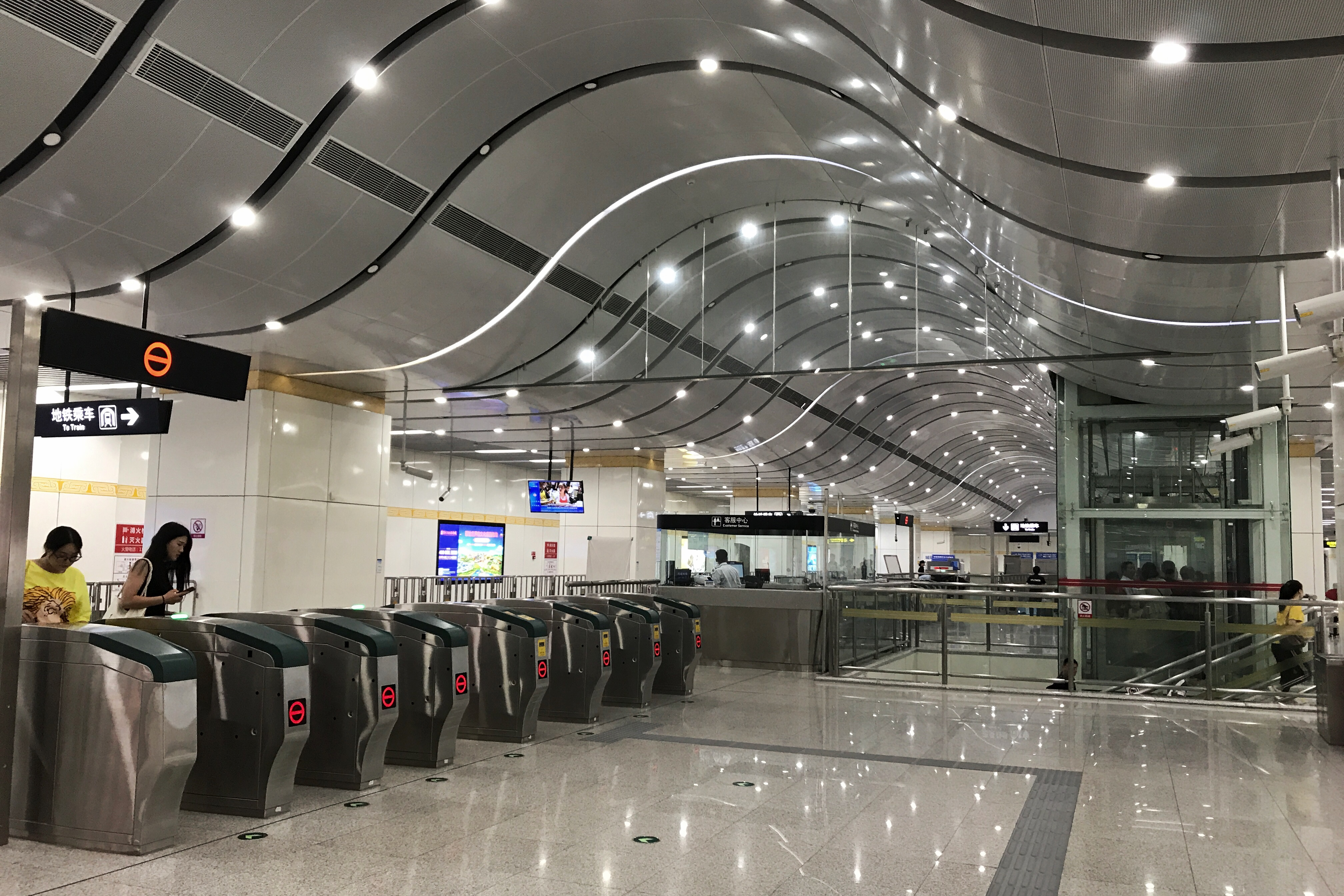
The concourse

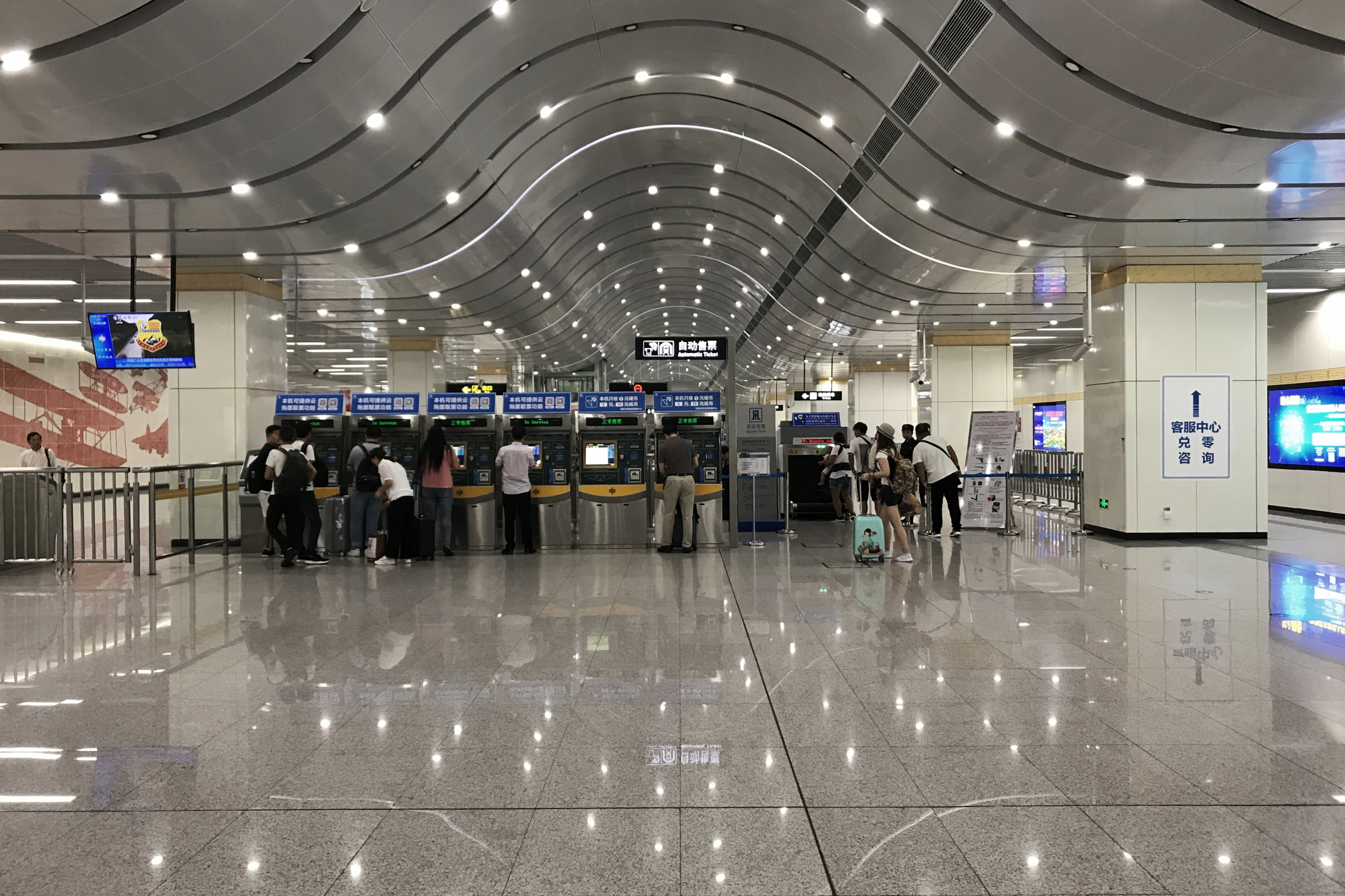
Ticket vending machines in the concourse

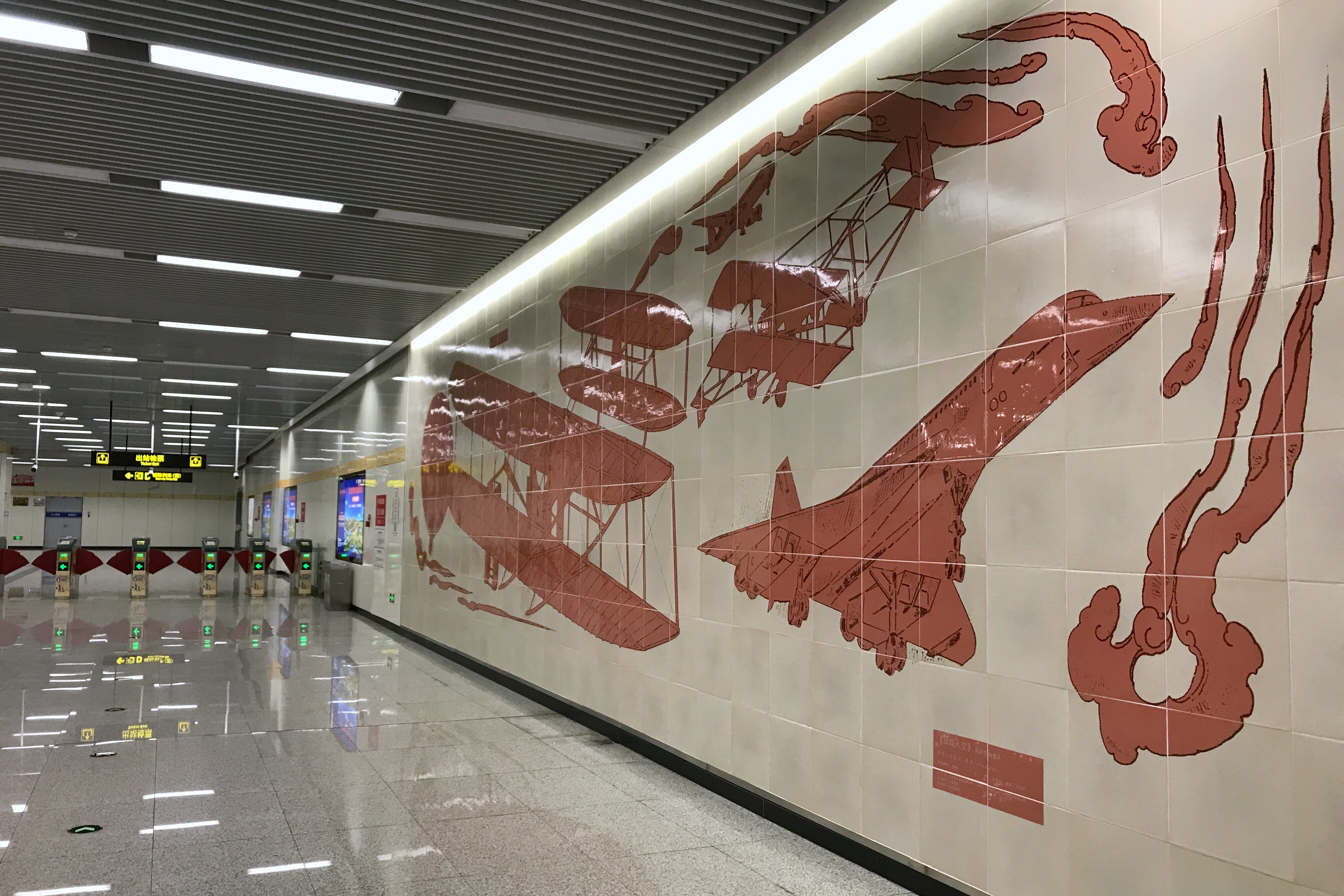
Mural at the station concourse

== Station layout ==
The station has 2 levels underground. The B2 level is for the entrances/exits and the concourse. A single island platform is on the B3 level.

B2
Concourse

Exits, Customer Service, Vending machines,

Xinzheng Airport railway station concourse

B3
Platforms
Platform 2
← Chengjiao line towards Jiahe (Zonghebaoshuiqu)
Island platform
Platform 1
→ Chengjiao line towards Zhengzhou Hangkonggang Railway Station (Jichangdong)

== Exits ==
Exit	Destination
Exit A	Car park of Zhengzhou Xinzheng International Airport
Exit B	Terminal 2 of Zhengzhou Xinzheng International Airport
Exit C	Xinzheng Airport railway station
Exit D	Xinzheng Airport railway station
