= Shibalihe station =

Metro station in Zhengzhou, China

Shibalihe 十八里河
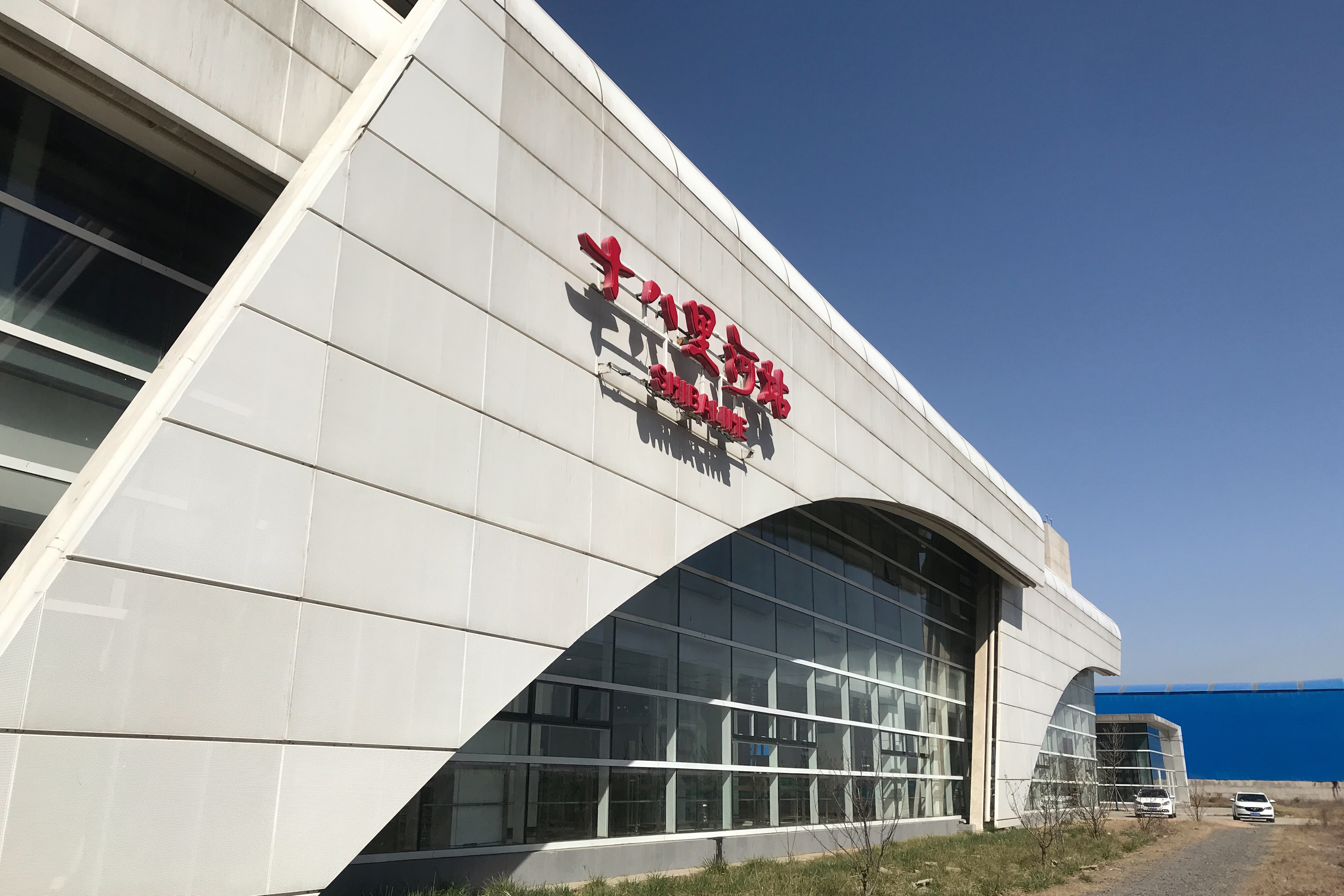

General information
- Location: Xiaoliudong Village; Guancheng, Zhengzhou; China
- Coordinates: 34.6490°N 113.6775°E
- System: Zhengzhou Metro rapid transit station
- Operator: Zhengzhou Metro
- Line: Chengjiao line
- Platforms: 4 (2 island platforms)

Construction
- Structure type: Underground

Other information
- Station code: 237

History
- Opened: 12 January 2017

Services
Preceding station	Zhengzhou Metro	Following station
Nansihuan towards Jiahe	Chengjiao line through services via Line 2	Shawoli towards Zhengzhou Hangkonggang Railway Station
Location
- Location within Zhengzhou

Shibalihe (Chinese: 十八里河) is a metro station of Zhengzhou Metro Chengjiao line.

== Station layout ==
The station has a station building where the station concourse is located on the ground level. The platforms are on the underground B1 level. The station has 2 parallel island platforms and 4 platforms in total. Currently only the inner 2 platforms are in use and the outer 2 platforms are not for service.

G	Concourse	Exits, Customer Service, Vending machines
B1; Platforms	Platform 4	Reserved
B1; Platforms	Island platform
B1; Platforms	Platform 3	← Chengjiao line towards Jiahe (Nansihuan)
B1; Platforms	Platform 2	Chengjiao line towards Zhengzhou Hangkonggang Railway Station (Shawoli) →
B1; Platforms	Island platform
B1; Platforms	Platform 1	Reserved

== Exits ==
Exit	Destination
Exit A	
Exit B	Chengnan Depot

== Future developments ==
According to the plan, the station will become the southern terminus of Line 2 in the future, and cross-platform interchange between Line 2 and Line 9 (of which the first phase is called the Chengjiao line) at this station will be realized.
