= Huangdian =

Huangdian (黄店镇) may refer to the following locations in China:

- Huangdian, Henan, town in Zhongmu County
- Huangdian, Shandong, town in Dingtao County
- Huangdian, Zhejiang, town in Lanxi
