= Hua'nancheng station =

Metro station in Zhengzhou, China

Hua'nancheng 华南城
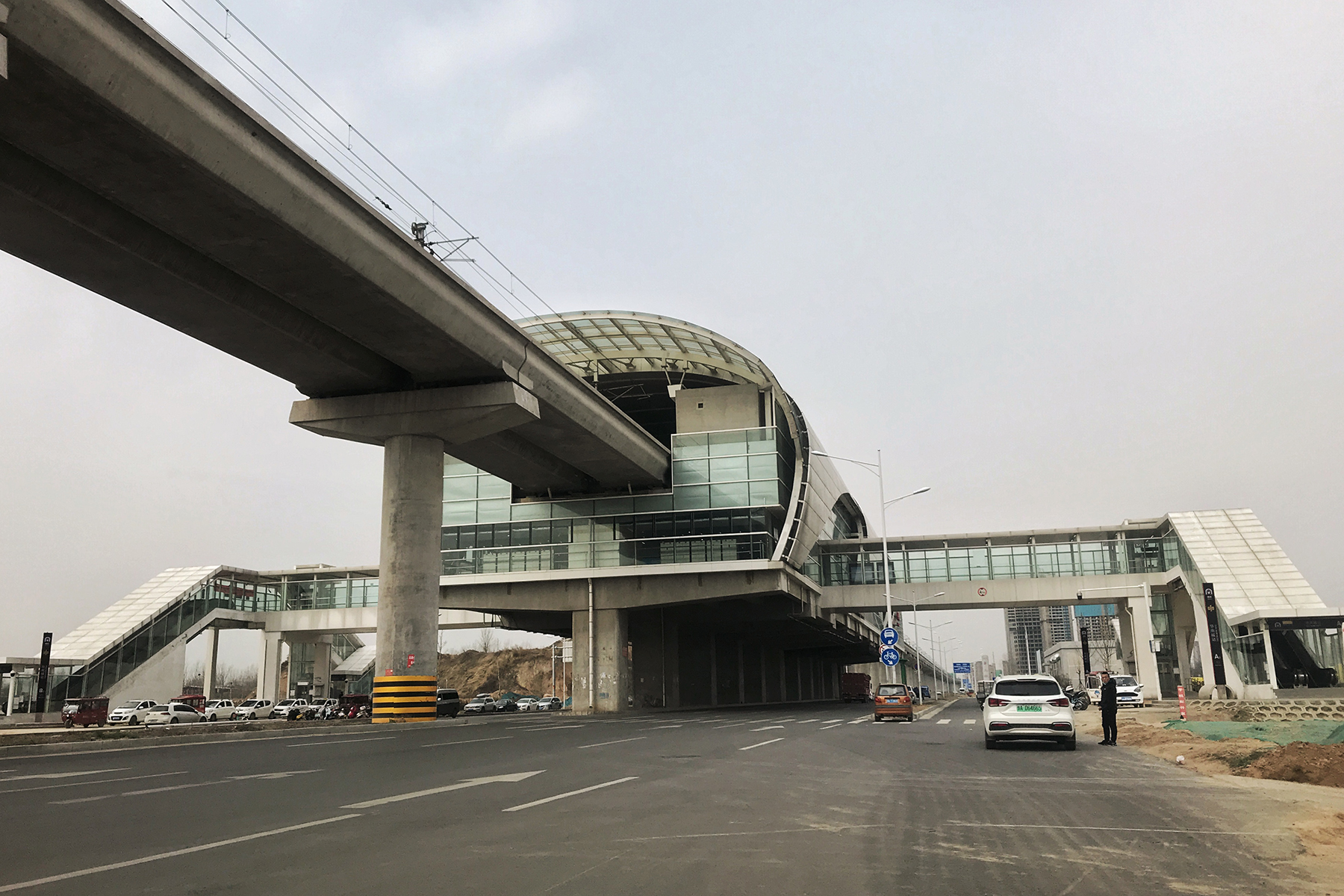

General information
- Location: Hua'nancheng Avenue; Xinzheng, Zhengzhou; China
- Coordinates: 34.5952°N 113.7428°E
- System: Zhengzhou Metro rapid transit station
- Operator: Zhengzhou Metro
- Line: Chengjiao line
- Platforms: 2

Construction
- Structure type: Elevated

Other information
- Station code: 242

History
- Opened: 12 January 2017

Services
Preceding station	Zhengzhou Metro	Following station
Hua'nancheng West towards Jiahe	Chengjiao line through services Line 2	Mengzhuang towards Zhengzhou Hangkonggang Railway Station
Location
- Location within Zhengzhou

Hua'nancheng (Chinese: 华南城) is a metro station of Zhengzhou Metro Chengjiao line.

== Station layout ==
The station is an elevated station with 3 levels. The ground level is for the entrances/exits and the 2nd level is for the station concourse and footbridges connecting Exit B. The 2 side platforms for Chengjiao line is on the 3rd level.

3F; Platforms	Side platform, doors will open on the right
3F; Platforms	Platform 2	← Chengjiao line towards Jiahe (Hua'nancheng West)
3F; Platforms	Platform 1	Chengjiao line towards Zhengzhou Hangkonggang Railway Station (Mengzhuang) →
3F; Platforms	Side platform, doors will open on the right
2F	Concourse	Customer service, Vending machines
G		Exits

== Exits ==
Exit	Destination
Exit A1 & A2	Hua'nancheng Avenue (north side)
Exit B1 & B2	Hua'nancheng Avenue (south side)
