= Shawoli station =

Metro station in Zhengzhou, China

Shawoli 沙窝李
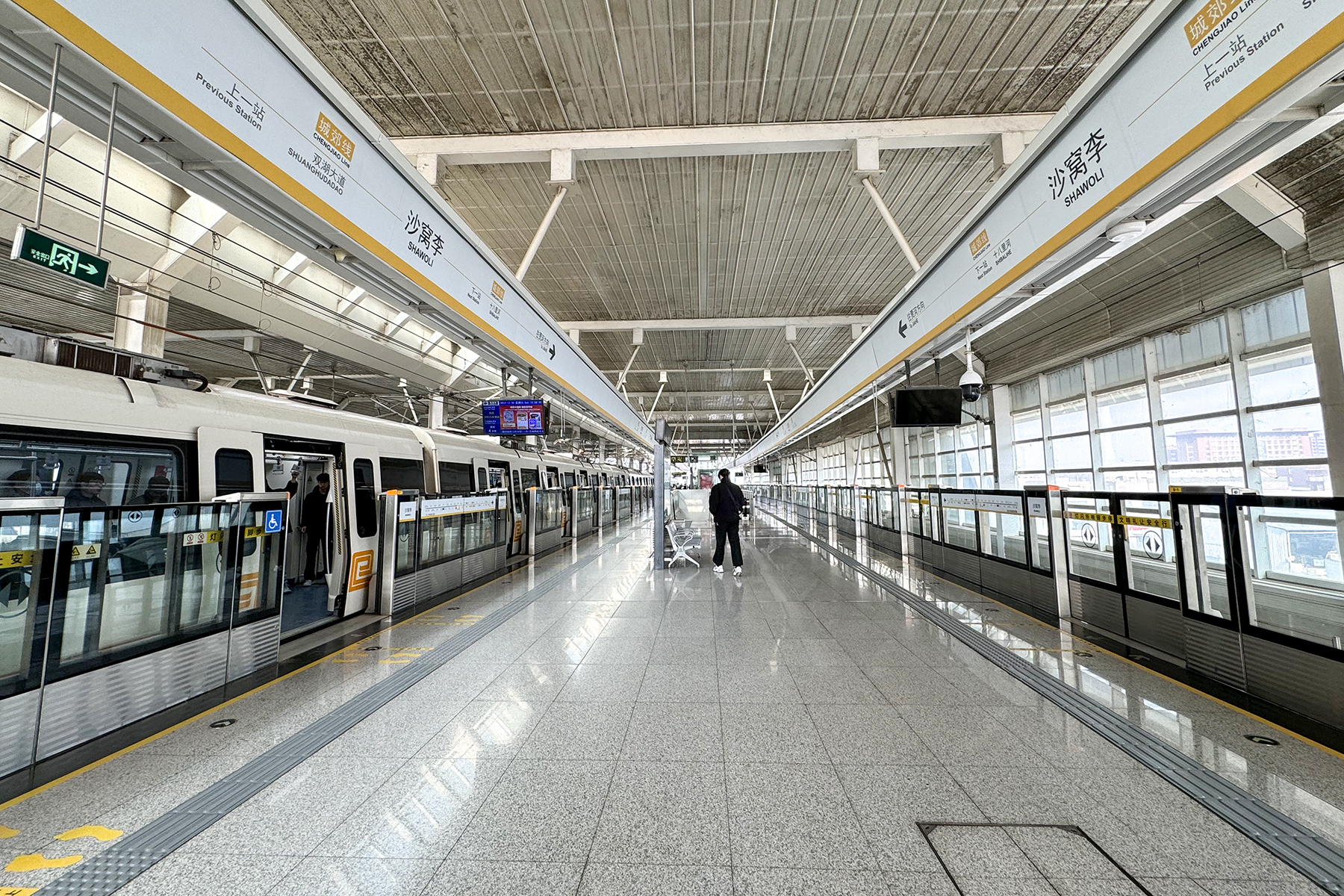

General information
- Location: Longhu Town, Xinzheng, Zhengzhou; China
- Coordinates: 34.6279°N 113.6755°E
- System: Zhengzhou Metro rapid transit station
- Operator: Zhengzhou Metro
- Line: Chengjiao line
- Platforms: 4 (2 island platforms)

Construction
- Structure type: Elevated

Other information
- Station code: 238

History
- Opened: 12 January 2017

Services
Preceding station	Zhengzhou Metro	Following station
Shibalihe towards Jiahe	Chengjiao line through services via Line 2	Shuanghudadao towards Zhengzhou Hangkonggang Railway Station
Location
- Location within Zhengzhou

Shawoli (Chinese: 沙窝李) is a metro station of Zhengzhou Metro Chengjiao line.

== Station layout ==
The station is an elevated station with 3 levels. The ground level is for the entrances/exits and the 2nd level is for the station concourse and footbridges connecting Exit B. The 2 island platforms are on the 3rd level.

The station is equipped with air-conditioned waiting rooms on its platforms.

3F; Platforms	Platform 4	← Chengjiao line towards Jiahe (Shibalihe)
3F; Platforms	Island platform
3F; Platforms	Platform 3	← Chengjiao line towards Jiahe (Shibalihe)
3F; Platforms	Platform 2	Chengjiao line towards Zhengzhou Hangkonggang Railway Station (Shuanghudadao) →
3F; Platforms	Island platform
3F; Platforms	Platform 1	Chengjiao line towards Zhengzhou Hangkonggang Railway Station (Shuanghudadao) →
2F	Concourse	Customer service, Vending machines
G		Exits

== Exits ==
Exit	Destination
Exit A1	Longhu Avenue (east side), Xiangyun Road
Exit A2	Longhu Avenue (east side), Xiangyun Road
Exit B1	Longhu Avenue (west side)
Exit B2	Longhu Avenue (west side)
