= Central Plains Metropolitan Region intercity railway =

Railway network in Zhengzhou, China

Central Plains MIR

Overview
- Locale: Zhengzhou, Luoyang, Kaifeng, Xinxiang, Jiaozuo, Xuchang, Pingdingshan, Luohe, Jiyuan
- Transit type: Higher-speed rail
- Number of lines: 3 (14 total)

Operation
- Began operation: 2014
- Operator: China Railway/China Railway High-speed

Technical
- Track gauge: 1,435 mm (4 ft 8 1/2 in) standard gauge
- Electrification: DC 25 kV overhead lines
System map
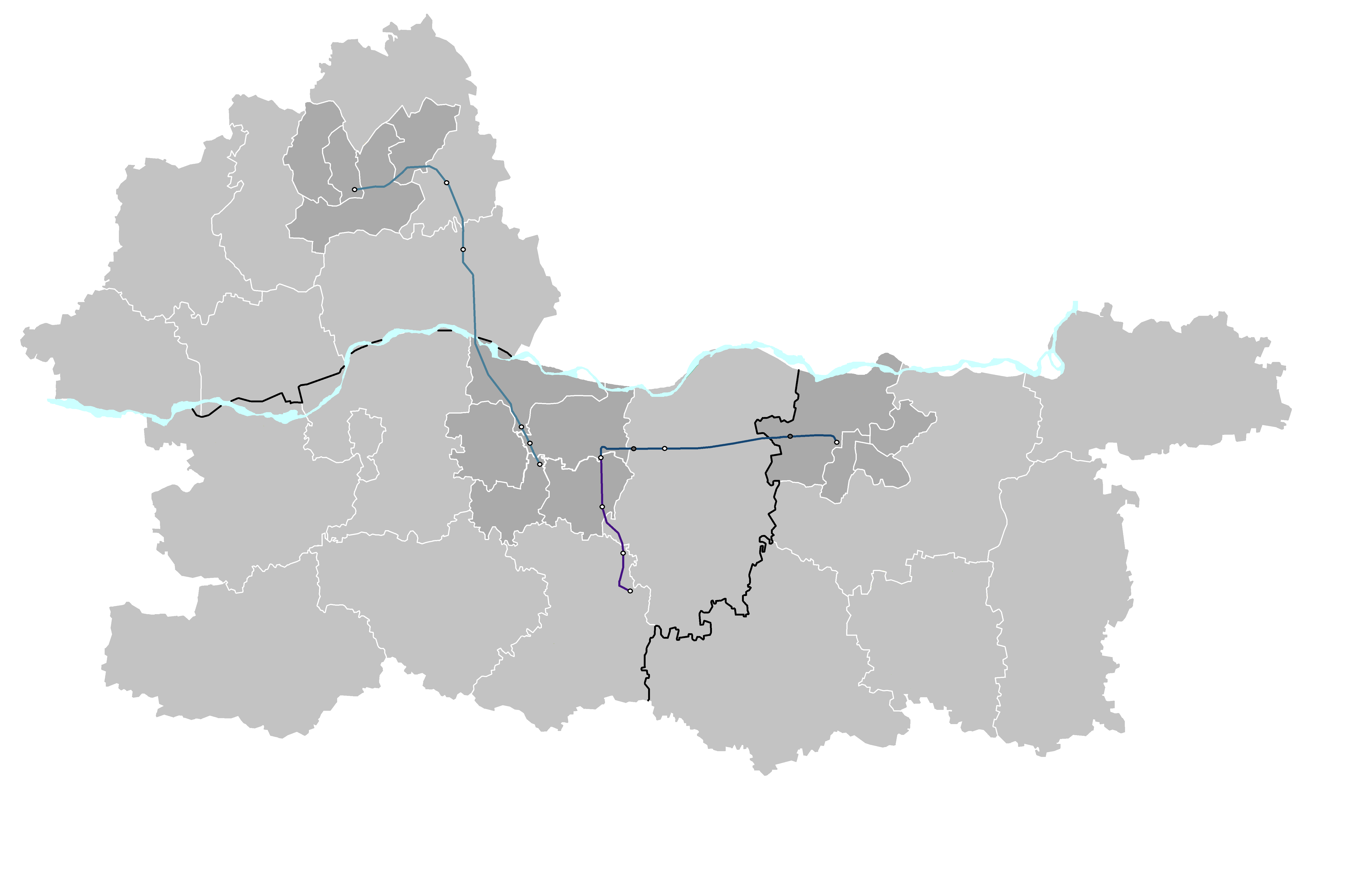

Central Plains Metropolitan Region intercity railway
- Traditional Chinese: 中原城市群城際軌道交通
- Simplified Chinese: 中原城市群城际轨道交通
Transcriptions
Standard Mandarin
- Hanyu Pinyin: Zhōngyuán Chéngshì Qún Chéngjì Guǐdào Jiāotōng

Central Plains Metropolitan Region intercity railway system is a network of 14 regional high-speed railways radiating or surrounding the city of Zhengzhou, Henan province, China. It is a plan for the gradual implementation of a regional rail system across the province. The system involves Zhengzhou, Luoyang, Kaifeng, Xinxiang, Jiaozuo, Xuchang, Pingdingshan, Luohe and Jiyuan, it aims to form a convenient, fast, safe and efficient intercity rail transportation network. In September 2009, the National Development and Reform Commission produced the "Central Plains Metropolitan Intercity Rail Transit Network Plan (2009–2020)", calling for the planning and construction of approximately 496 km of the total mileage across the regional high speed transit network. The vision is for greater transport opportunities and ultimately the formation of Zhengzhou as the urban centre, with Luoyang as a secondary urban centre, after connecting the major urban areas in the Central Plains urban agglomeration.

== Route planning ==
Based on "Central Plains Metropolitan Intercity Rail Transit Network Plan (2009–2020)", the Central Plains Metropolitan intercity railway construction includes separate railways Zhengzhou–Jiaozuo, Zhengzhou–Kaifeng, Zhengzhou–Luoyang, Zhengzhou–Xinzheng Airport–Xuchang–Pingdingshan, and Zhengzhou–Xinxiang.

== Intercity railway routes ==
=== Operational lines ===
- Zhengzhou–Kaifeng intercity railway
- Zhengzhou–Jiaozuo intercity railway
- Zhengzhou–Xinzheng Airport intercity railway

=== Lines under construction ===
- Zhengzhou–Xuchang intercity railway (South extension)
- Zhengzhou–Jiaozuo intercity railway Yuntaishan extension

=== Short term planning ===
- Zhengzhou–Luoyang intercity railway
- Zhengzhou–Xinxiang intercity railway
- Zhengzhou–Xuchang intercity railway Xuchang–Pingdingshan extension

=== Long term planning ===
- Zhengzhou–Xinxiang intercity railway Xinxiang–Jiaozuo extension
- Jiaozuo–Qinyang–Jiyuan line
- Jiyuan–Jili–Luoyang line
- Luoyang–Yichuan–Ruzhou–Baofeng–Pingdingshan line
- Zhengzhou–Xuchang intercity railway Xuchang–Linying–Luohe extension
- Zhengzhou–Luoyang intercity railway Xingyang–Gongyi–Yanshi branch line
