= Zhengzhou–Xinzheng Airport intercity railway =

Railway line in Zhengzhou, China

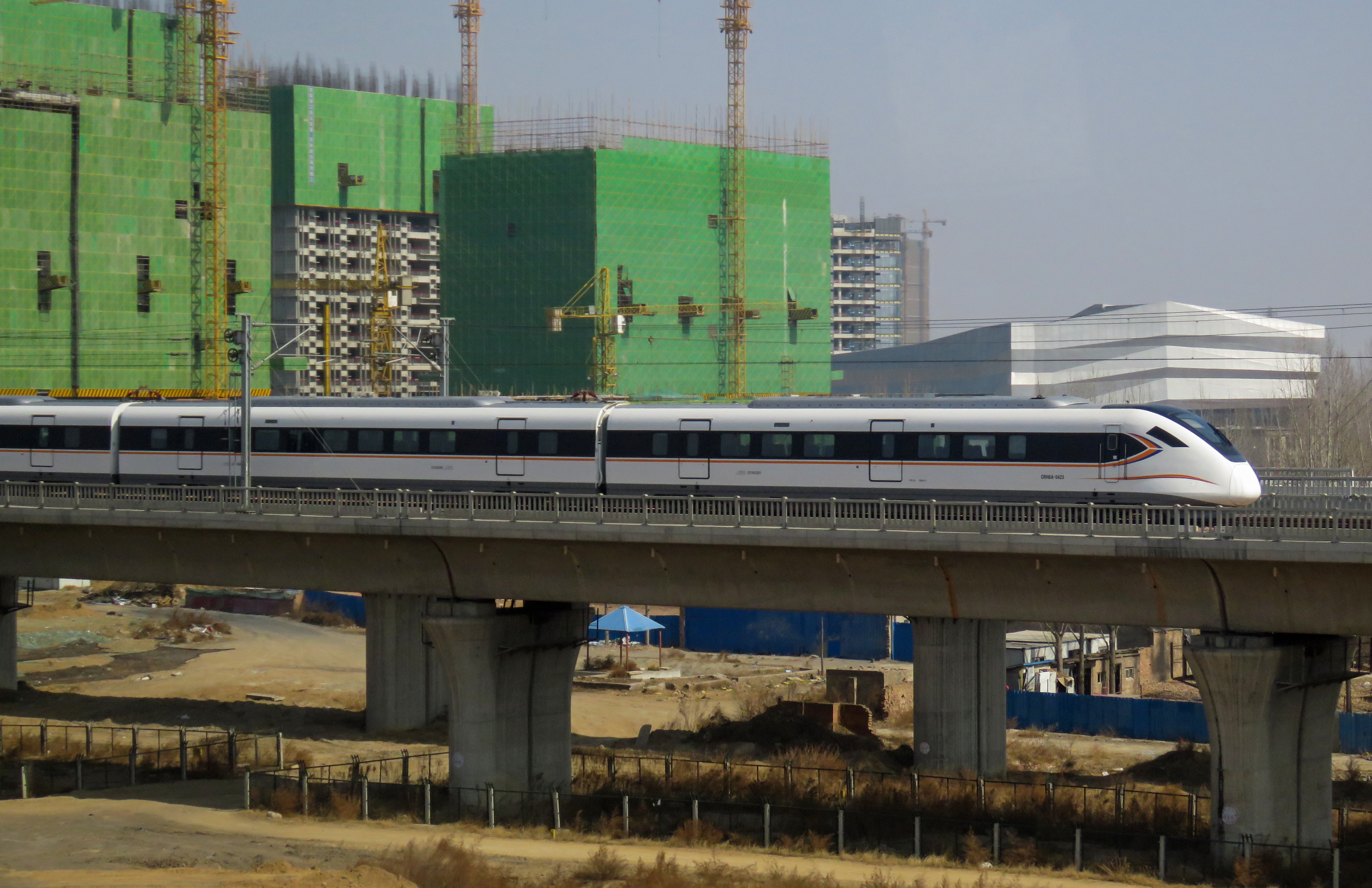
- A CRH6A EMU running on the line

Overview
- Native name: 郑机城际铁路
- Status: Operational
- Owner: China Railway
- Locale: Zhengzhou
- Termini: Zhengzhou East; Zhengzhou Hangkonggang
- Stations: 5

Service
- System: Central Plains MIR
- Operator: CR Zhengzhou
- Rolling stock: CRH2A (former); CRH6A

History
- Opened: 31 December 2015

Technical
- Number of tracks: 2 (Double-track)
- Track gauge: 1,435 mm (4 ft 8 1/2 in) standard gauge
- Electrification: 25 kV 50 Hz AC (Overhead line)
- Operating speed: 200 km/h (124 mph)

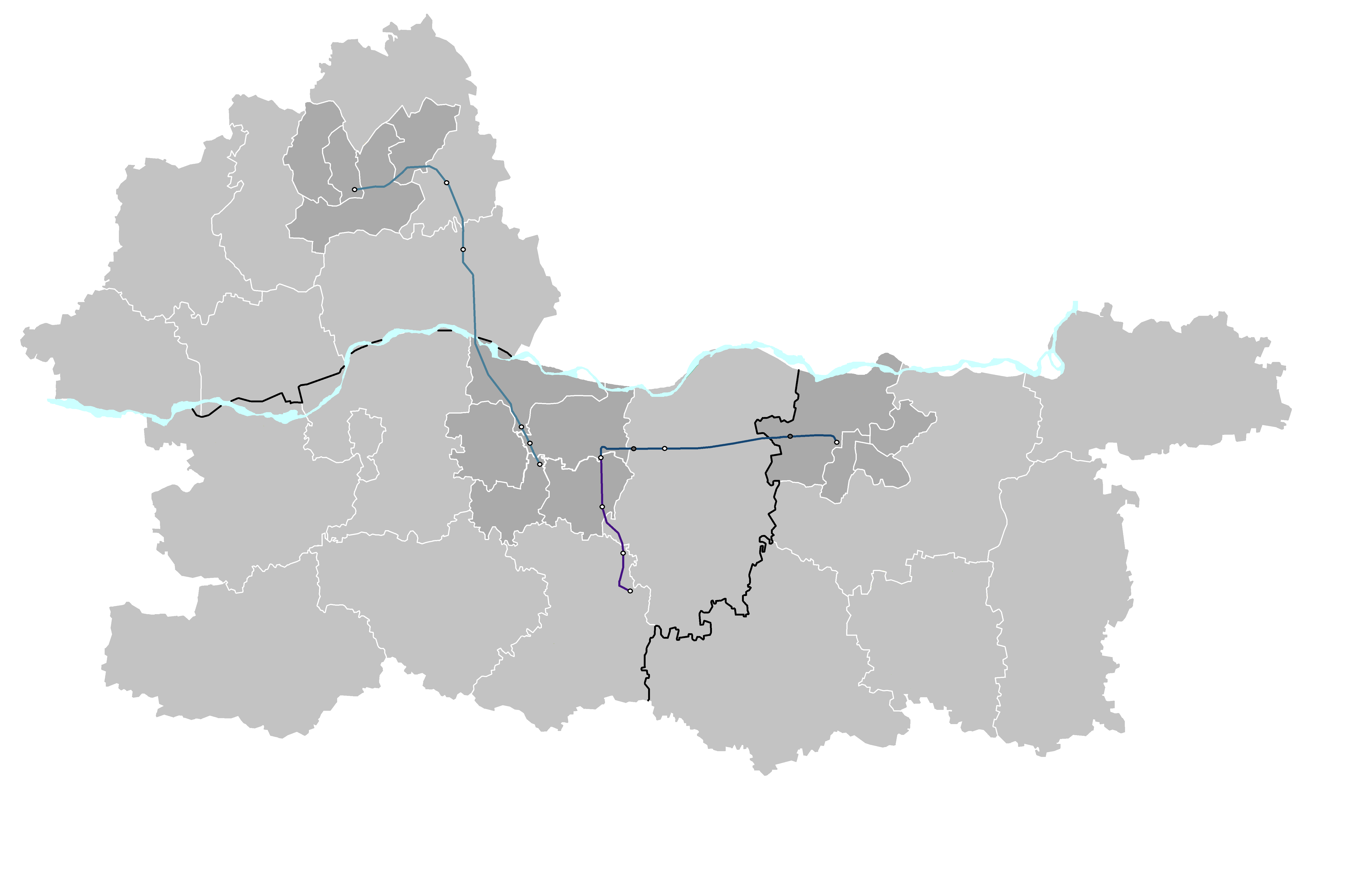
Zhengzhou–Xinzheng Airport intercity railway is indicated by the purple line

Zhengzhou–Xinzheng Airport intercity railway (Chinese: 郑机城际铁路) is a regional higher-speed railway in Zhengzhou, Henan, China. The railway provides Zhengzhou city center fast train connections with Zhengzhou Xinzheng International Airport. It is a component of the larger Central Plain Metropolitan Intercity Rail network. With the opening of the railway, it takes only 19 mins from Zhengzhou East railway station to Xinzheng Airport.

== History ==
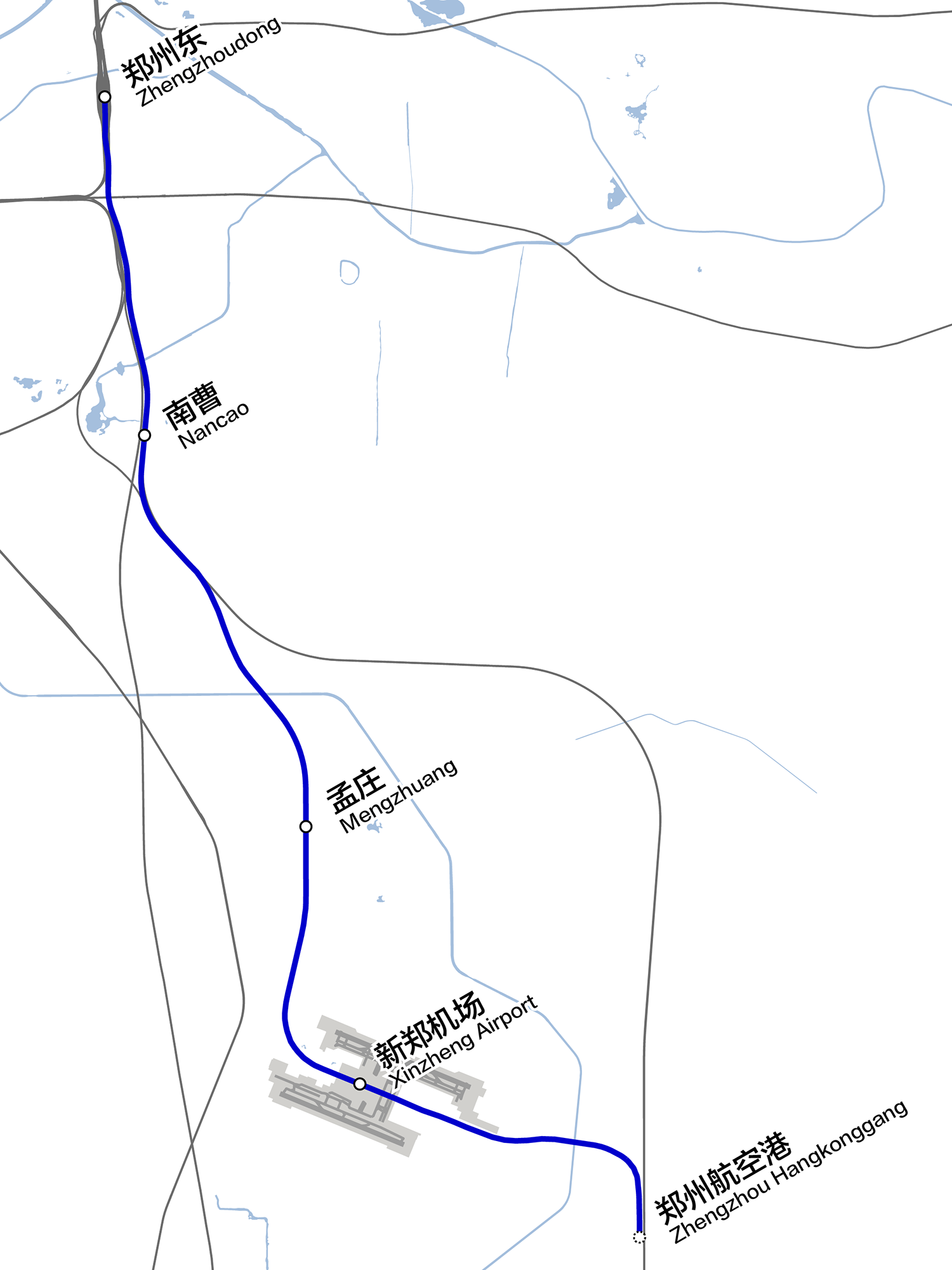
Route map of Zhengzhou-Xinzheng Airport Intercity Railway

The railway opened on 31 December 2015.

A southern extension from Xinzheng Airport to Zhengzhou Hangkonggang was opened on 20 June 2022.

== Stations ==
There are five stations along the railway, of which Nancao, Mengzhuang are unopened to passengers until September 28, 2024. Some trains through operate to Songchenglu via the Zhengkai ICR or to Jiaozuo via the Zhengjiao ICR.

Station code	Station name		Connections	Location	
Station code	English	Chinese	Connections	Location	
ZAF	Zhengzhou East	郑州东	1 5 8	Jinshui	Zhengzhou
NEF	Nancao	南曹	3 (adjacent station - Sizhao)	Guancheng	Zhengzhou
MZF	Mengzhuang	孟庄	Chengjiao (adjacent station - Gangqu North)	Xinzheng	Zhengzhou
EZF	Xinzheng Airport	新郑机场	Chengjiao (adjacent station - Xinzheng International Airport)	Xinzheng	Zhengzhou
ZIF	Zhengzhou Hangkonggang	郑州航空港	Chengjiao	Zhongmu	Zhengzhou

== Rolling stock ==
CRH2A EMUs had been used for service in the initial operation stage. From February 2018, new CRH6A EMUs have replaced CRH2As for service.
