= Liuji, Zhongmu County =

Liuji 刘集镇
- Town
- Location in Henan
- Coordinates: 34°48′11″N 113°55′37″E
- Country: People's Republic of China
- Province: Henan
- Prefecture-level city: Zhengzhou
- County: Zhongmu
- Elevation: 82 m (269 ft)
- Time zone: UTC+8 (China Standard)
- Postal code: 414560
- Area code: 0371

Liuji (simplified Chinese: 刘集; traditional Chinese: 劉集; pinyin: Liújí) is a town of Zhongmu County in north-central Henan province, China, located 11 kilometres (6.8 mi) northwest of the county seat in the eastern suburbs of Zhengzhou, the provincial capital. As of 2011, it has 29 villages under its administration.

== See also ==
- List of township-level divisions of Henan
