= Only Henan =

Theme park in Henan, China

Unique Henan: Land of Dramas 只有河南·戏剧幻城
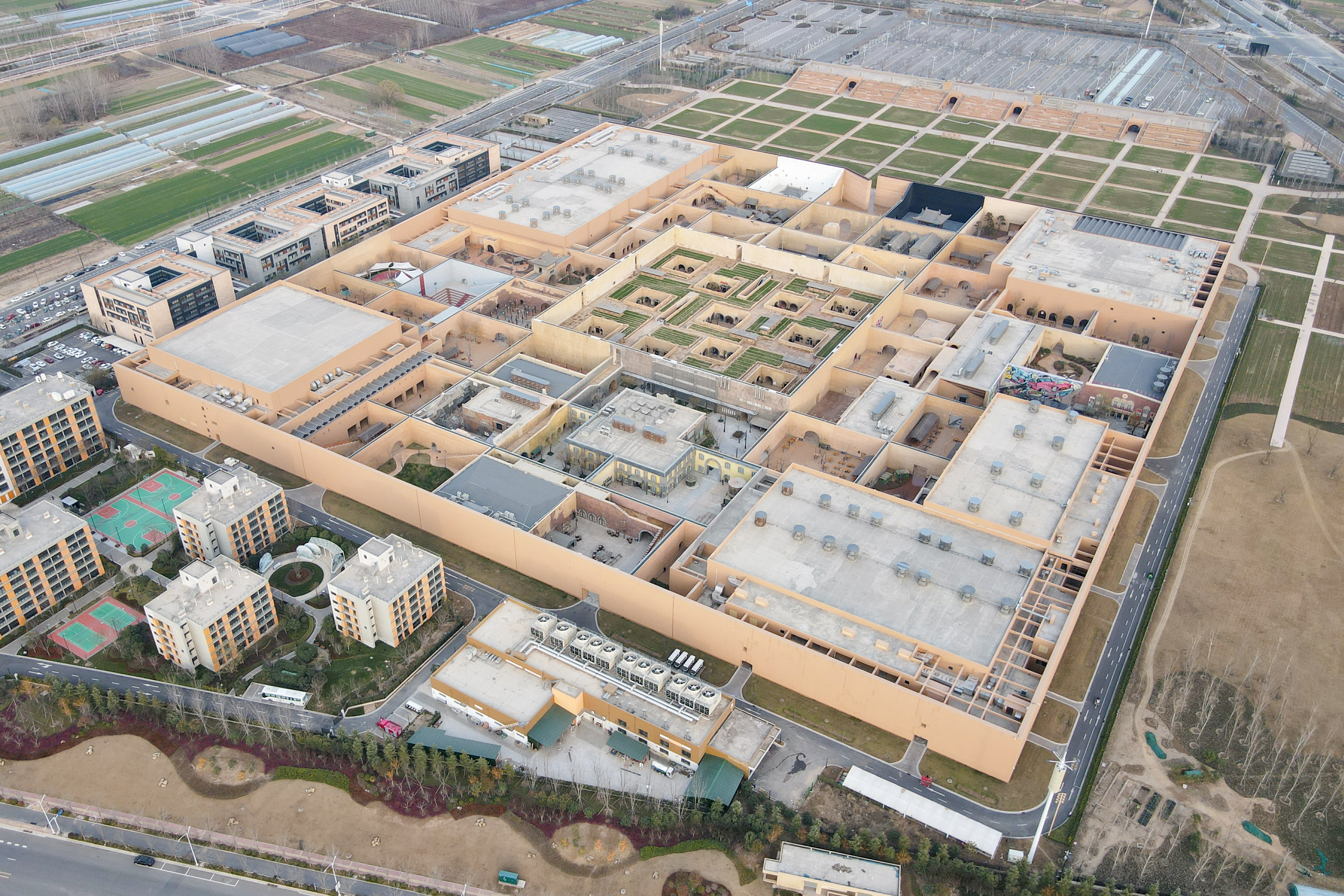
- Location: Zhongmu County, Zhengzhou, Henan, China
- Opened: June 6, 2021; 5 years ago
- Owner: Jianye Group
- Theme: Henan history and culture
- Area: 622mu
- Website: http://www.uniquehenan.com/

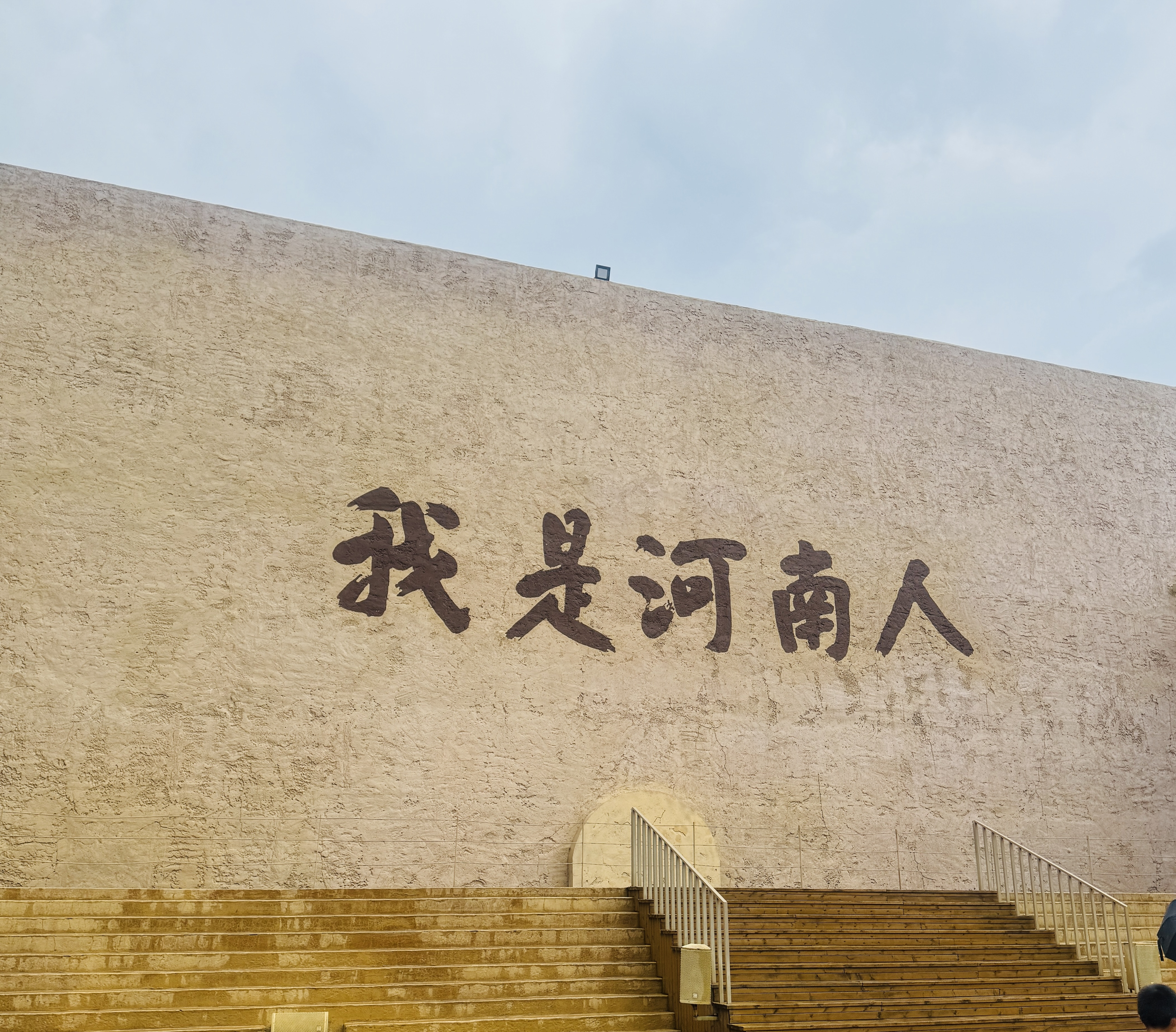
Exterior wall

Unique Henan: Land of Dramas, commonly referred to as "Only Henan" (Simplified Chinese: 只有河南; Traditional Chinese: 衹有河南; Pinyin: Zhǐyǒu Hénán), is a theme park located in Zhongmu County, Zhengzhou, Henan, China. The park opened on June 6, 2021. It uses panoramic immersive drama as its exhibition medium, with history and culture of Henan as its theme. The project was invested by Jianye Group, with Wang Chaoge serving as the chief director.

== Architecture ==
The park covers an area of 622mu, with its core area being a "Fantasy City" structure measuring 328 meters on each side and 15 meters in height, surrounded by wheat fields. The exterior walls are made from Henan loess, constructed using traditional rammed earth techniques, presenting an overall square city silhouette. The overall layout adopts a "large chessboard" spatial plan, with the interior composed of 56 courtyard grids of varying sizes, interconnected by arches and passageways. At the center of the park, a replica of a western Henan Dikeng yard serves as a commercial and cultural heritage exhibition space. At the entrance stands a square broken pillar constructed of rammed loess, with its surface inscribed in clerical script.

== Performances ==
The park contains a total of 21 theaters, including 3 main theaters, 10 micro theaters, and multiple situational drama spaces, capable of accommodating approximately 10,000 spectators simultaneously. The total duration of all performances is nearly 700 minutes, with over 100 performances possible on a single day. The repertoire covers themes including historical figures of the Central Plains, Henan famine of 1942–1943, modern railway construction, and campus life, and also includes nighttime light shows. The performances employ technologies such as holographic projection and digitally controlled machinery.
