= Baisha, Zhongmu County =

Baisha 白沙镇
- Town
- Location in Henan
- Coordinates: 34.7291°N 113.9015°E
- Country: People's Republic of China
- Province: Henan
- Prefecture-level city: Zhengzhou
- County: Zhongmu County
- Time zone: UTC+8 (China Standard)

Baisha (Chinese: 白沙) is a town of Zhongmu County, Henan, China. As of 2018, it has 16 villages under its administration.
