= Huangdian, Henan =

Huangdian 黄店镇
- Town
- Location in Henan
- Coordinates: 34°32′58″N 114°00′29″E
- Country: People's Republic of China
- Province: Henan
- Prefecture-level city: Zhengzhou
- County: Zhongmu
- Elevation: 94 m (308 ft)
- Time zone: UTC+8 (China Standard)
- Area code: 0371

Huangdian (simplified Chinese: 黄店; traditional Chinese: 黃店; pinyin: Huángdiàn) is a town of Zhongmu County in north-central Henan province, China, located 18 kilometres (11 mi) south of the county seat. As of 2011, it has 32 villages under its administration.

== See also ==
- List of township-level divisions of Henan
