= Xinzheng Airport railway station =

Railway station in Zhengzhou, China

Xinzheng Airport 新郑机场
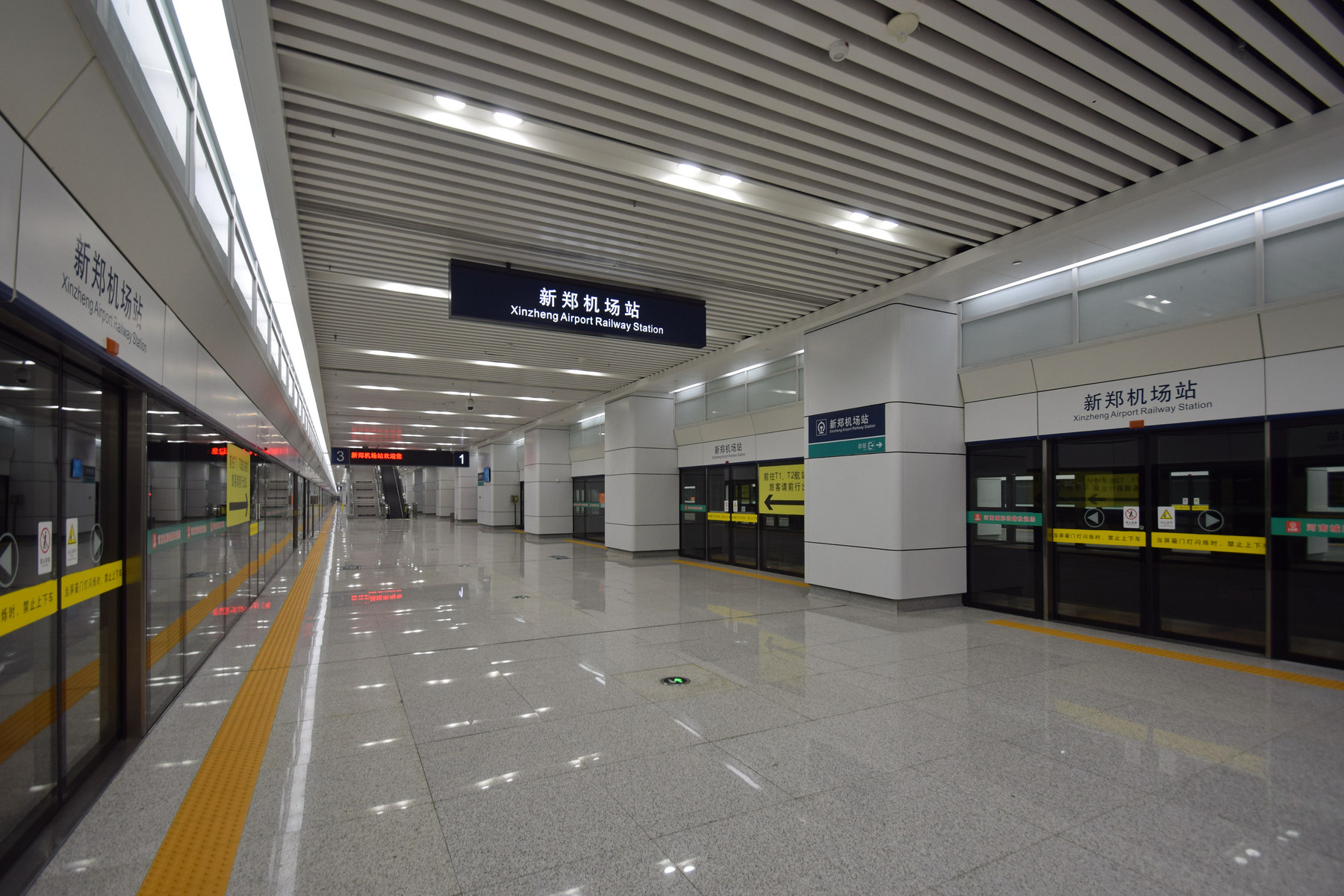

General information
- Other names: Xinzheng Airport
- Location: B2 floor on GTC of Xinzheng International Airport; Zhengzhou Airport Economy Zone, Zhengzhou, Henan; China
- Coordinates: 34°31′37″N 113°50′51″E
- Operator: CR Zhengzhou
- Line: Zhengzhou–Xinzheng Airport intercity railway
- Platforms: 4 (2 island platforms)
- Connections: Zhengzhou Xinzheng International Airport; Xinzheng International Airport station; Bus

Construction
- Structure type: Underground

Other information
- Station code: 65705 (TMIS code); EZF (telegraph code); XZC (Pinyin code)
- Classification: Third class station

History
- Opened: 31 December 2015

Services
Preceding station	China Railway High-speed	Following station
Mengzhuang towards Zhengzhou East	Zhengzhou–Xinzheng Airport intercity railway	Zhengzhou Hangkonggang Terminus
Location
- Location within Zhengzhou Location within Henan

Xinzheng Airport railway station (Chinese: 新郑机场站) is an underground railway station on Zhengzhou–Xinzheng Airport Intercity Railway in Zhengzhou, Henan, China.

== Station layout ==
The station is located on the basement floors of the ground traffic center (GTC) of Zhengzhou Xinzheng International Airport, together with the Xinzheng International Airport station of Zhengzhou Metro. The station entrance, waiting hall and ticket offices are on the B2 floor and platforms are on the B3 floor.

The station has 4 platforms (2 island platforms): Platform 1 and 3 are in the north and Platform 2 and 4 are in the south.

B2F	Concourse	Ticket office Waiting hall Elevators and escalators to Terminal 2 Entrance of Zhengzhou Metro Xinzheng International Airport station
B3F; Platforms	Platform 3	Zhengzhou-Xinzheng Airport intercity railway
B3F; Platforms	Island platform
B3F; Platforms	Platform 1	Zhengzhou-Xinzheng Airport intercity railway
B3F; Platforms	Platform 2	Zhengzhou-Xinzheng Airport intercity railway
B3F; Platforms	Island platform
B3F; Platforms	Platform 4	Zhengzhou-Xinzheng Airport intercity railway
