= Zhongmu County =

Zhongmu 中牟县
- County
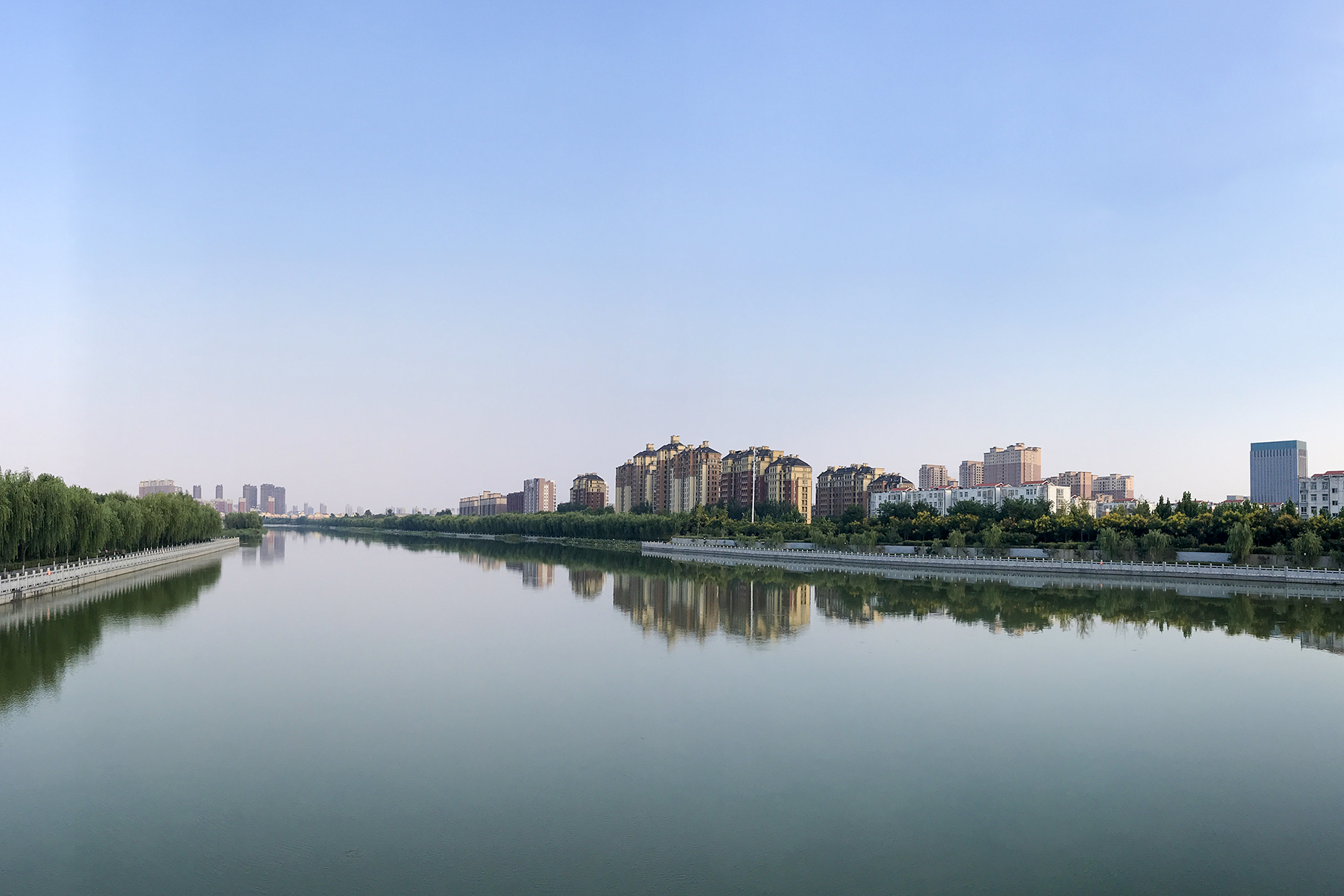
- Jialu River in Zhongmu County

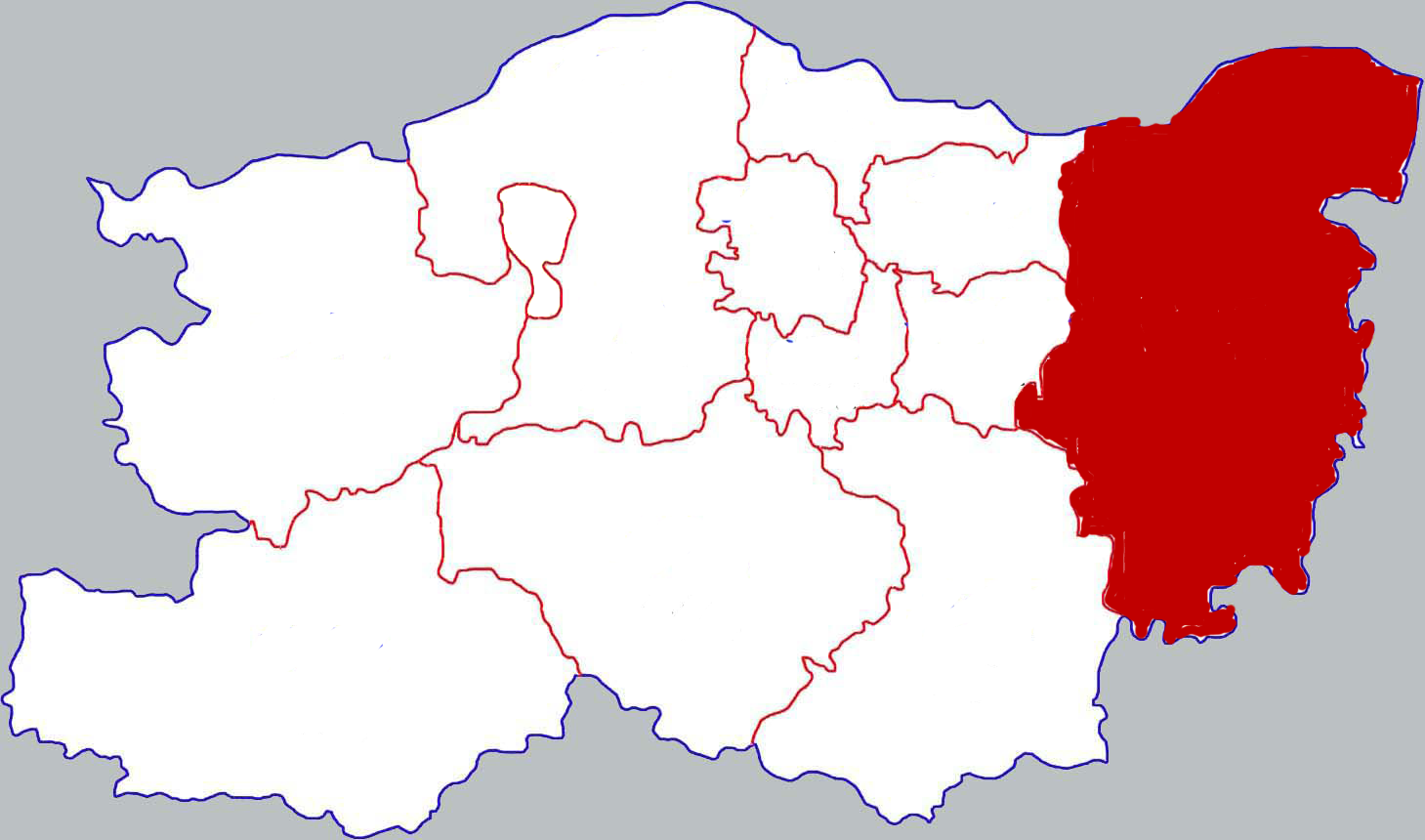
- Location in Zhengzhou

- Location of the seat in Henan
- Coordinates: 34°44′N 114°0′E
- Country: People's Republic of China
- Province: Henan
- Prefecture-level city: Zhengzhou

Area
  - Total: 1,393 km^{2} (538 sq mi)

Population (2019)
  - Total: 1,161,600
  - Density: 833.9/km^{2} (2,160/sq mi)
- Time zone: UTC+8 (China Standard)
- Postal code: 451450
- Area code: 0371
- Website: www.zhongmu.gov.cn

Zhongmu County (Chinese: 中牟; pinyin: Zhōngmù; postal: Chungmow) is a county of Henan Province, South Central China, under the administration of the prefecture-level city of Zhengzhou, the capital of Henan. It has an area of 1,416.8 km^{2} (547.0 sq mi) and a population of 680,000. Located in the north-central part of the province, it is the easternmost county-level division of Zhengzhou.

The Battle of Guandu took place in 200 CE in the northeast of Zhongmu County.

In November 2004, martial law was declared in Zhongmou County, to quell deadly ethnic clashes between Han and Hui. The reported number of deaths ranged between 7 and 148.

== Administrative divisions ==
As of 2012, this county is further divided to 2 subdistricts, 15 towns and 1 township.

Subdistricts

- Qingnianlu Subdistrict (青年路街道)
- Dongfenglu Subdistrict (东风路街道)

Towns

- Hansi (韩寺镇)
- Guandu (官渡镇)
- Langchenggang (狼城岗镇)
- Wantan (万滩镇)
- Baisha (白沙镇)
- Zheng'an (郑庵镇)
- Zhangzhuang (张庄镇)
- Huangdian (黄店镇)
- Dameng (大孟镇)
- Jiulong (九龙镇)
- Liuji (刘集镇)
- Bagang (八岗镇)
- Yanminghu (雁鸣湖镇)
- Yaojia (姚家镇)
- Sanguanmiao (三官庙镇)

Townships

- Diaojia Township (刁家乡)

== Climate ==
Climate data for Zhongmu, elevation 78 m (256 ft), (1991–2020 normals, extremes 1981–present)
Month	Jan	Feb	Mar	Apr	May	Jun	Jul	Aug	Sep	Oct	Nov	Dec	Year
Record high °C (°F)	21.1 (70.0)	24.5 (76.1)	31.0 (87.8)	35.7 (96.3)	38.9 (102.0)	39.6 (103.3)	39.9 (103.8)	39.0 (102.2)	38.3 (100.9)	34.3 (93.7)	27.8 (82.0)	23.6 (74.5)	39.9 (103.8)
Mean daily maximum °C (°F)	5.7 (42.3)	9.7 (49.5)	15.6 (60.1)	22.1 (71.8)	27.6 (81.7)	31.9 (89.4)	32.1 (89.8)	30.8 (87.4)	27.1 (80.8)	21.8 (71.2)	14.2 (57.6)	7.7 (45.9)	20.5 (69.0)
Daily mean °C (°F)	0.7 (33.3)	4.1 (39.4)	9.7 (49.5)	16.0 (60.8)	21.7 (71.1)	26.1 (79.0)	27.4 (81.3)	26.1 (79.0)	21.6 (70.9)	15.9 (60.6)	8.7 (47.7)	2.7 (36.9)	15.1 (59.1)
Mean daily minimum °C (°F)	−3.2 (26.2)	−0.2 (31.6)	4.9 (40.8)	10.7 (51.3)	16.3 (61.3)	21.0 (69.8)	23.7 (74.7)	22.6 (72.7)	17.5 (63.5)	11.3 (52.3)	4.4 (39.9)	−1.1 (30.0)	10.7 (51.2)
Record low °C (°F)	−16.6 (2.1)	−15.2 (4.6)	−11.7 (10.9)	−1.7 (28.9)	4.3 (39.7)	11.5 (52.7)	16.7 (62.1)	12.1 (53.8)	7.3 (45.1)	0.6 (33.1)	−13.2 (8.2)	−12.3 (9.9)	−16.6 (2.1)
Average precipitation mm (inches)	8.0 (0.31)	11.0 (0.43)	17.7 (0.70)	37.0 (1.46)	57.4 (2.26)	65.0 (2.56)	122.5 (4.82)	114.1 (4.49)	62.7 (2.47)	34.6 (1.36)	26.2 (1.03)	7.5 (0.30)	563.7 (22.19)
Average precipitation days (≥ 0.1 mm)	3.2	3.9	5.1	5.4	6.7	7.0	10.7	9.6	8.3	6.3	5.0	3.2	74.4
Average snowy days	4.0	3.1	1.3	0.2	0	0	0	0	0	0	1.2	3.1	12.9
Average relative humidity (%)	60	59	58	62	62	64	78	79	74	68	65	61	66
Mean monthly sunshine hours	112.3	126.1	172.0	200.7	211.7	193.3	175.0	166.6	152.4	153.3	134.4	121.0	1,918.8
Percentage possible sunshine	36	40	46	51	49	45	40	40	41	44	44	40	43
Source: China Meteorological Administration all-time January high

== Transportation ==
- China National Highway 220
- Zhengzhou Hangkonggang railway station

== See also ==
- Only Henan: Drama Fantasy City
