= Zhengzhou Airport Economy Zone =

Zhengzhou Airport Economy Zone 郑州航空港经济综合实验区
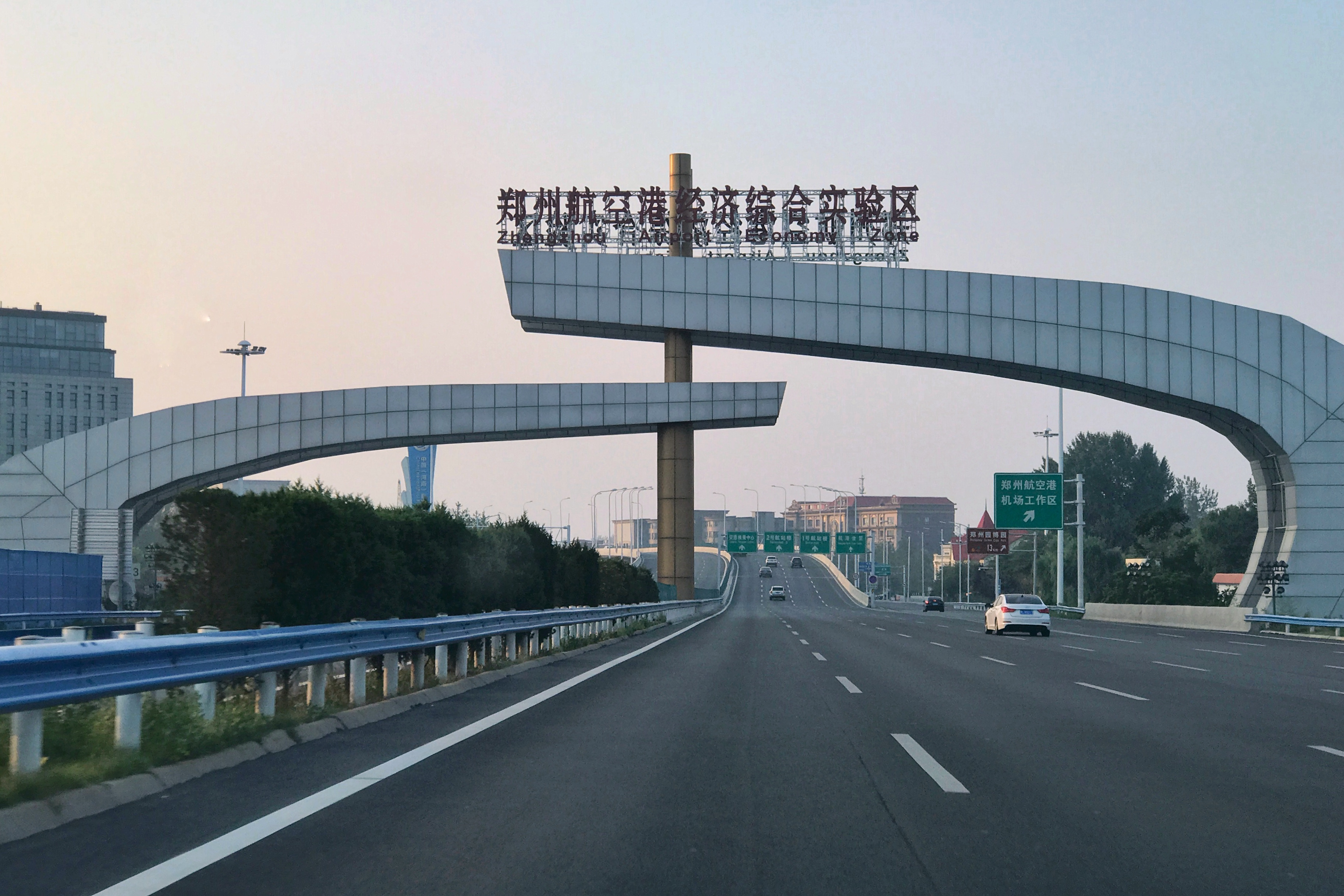
- A gate-shaped signpost of ZAEZ on Yingbin Elevated Road

- Location in Henan
- Coordinates: 34°32′0″N 113°49′52″E
- Country: People's Republic of China
- Province: Henan
- Prefecture-level city: Zhengzhou

Area
  - Total: 415 km^{2} (160 sq mi)
- Time zone: UTC+8 (China Standard Time)
- Area code: 0371
- Website: www.zzhkgq.gov.cn

Zhengzhou Airport Economy Zone (Chinese: 郑州航空港经济综合实验区), abbreviated as ZAEZ, is an airport-based economy zone developed around Zhengzhou Xinzheng International Airport in Henan, People's Republic of China. It is located about 25 kilometres (16 mi) to the southeast of Zhengzhou, and covers an area of 415 square kilometres (160 sq mi).

It contains Foxconn Zhengzhou Technology park, the largest producer of iPhone for Apple Inc.

== History ==
The history of Zhengzhou Airport Economy Zone dates back to October 2007, when Henan Provincial Party Committee and Henan Provincial People's Government approved its establishment. In 2010, Zhengzhou Xinzheng Comprehensive Bonded Zone (Chinese: 郑州新郑综合保税区) was established formally with the approval of the state council. In April 2011, the administrative committee of Zhengzhou Xinzheng Comprehensive Bonded Zone (Zhengzhou Airport Economy Zone) was set up. The current Zhengzhou Airport Economy Zone was approved to be established by the state council on 7 March 2013, making it the first state-level airport-based development area in China.

The local government has invested more than $1.5 billion to Foxconn to build large sections of their factory and nearby employee housing.

In November 2022, the government imposed the lockdown at the Zhengzhou Airport Economy Zone in response to protests against Zero-COVID restrictions at a Foxconn.

== Transport ==
- Zhengzhou Hangkonggang railway station
