= Zhengzhou Hangkonggang railway station =

Railway station in Zhengzhou, Henan, China

Zhengzhou Hangkonggang 郑州航空港
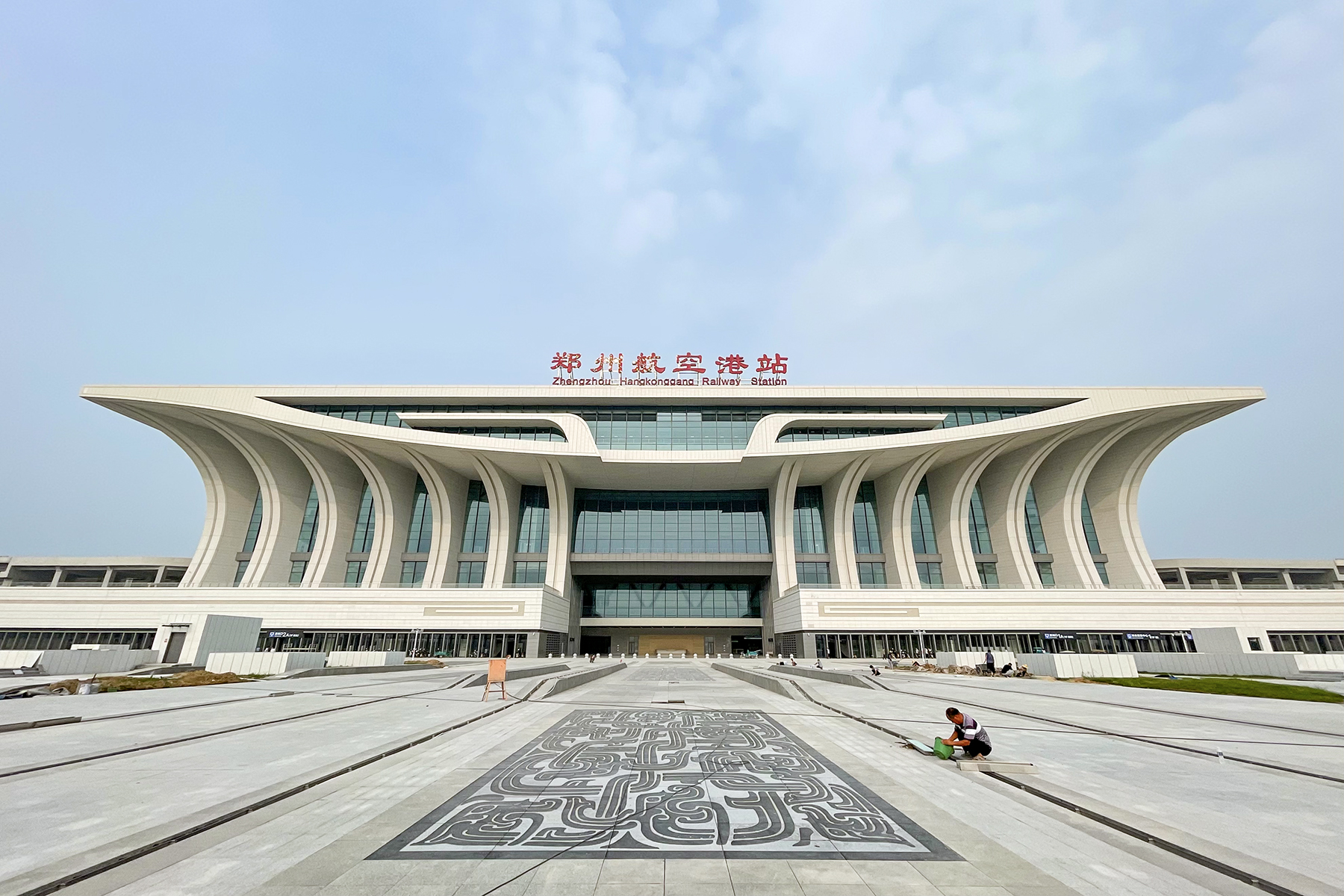

General information
- Location: Sanguanmiao, Zhongmu County, Zhengzhou, Henan; China
- Coordinates: 34°29′19″N 113°55′36″E
- Operated by: China Railway Zhengzhou Group
- Lines: Zhengzhou–Wanzhou high-speed railway; Zhengzhou–Fuyang high-speed railway; Zhengzhou–Xinzheng Airport intercity railway
- Platforms: 30
- Tracks: 32
- Connections: Chengjiao 13 (planned)

Other information
- Status: In operation

History
- Opened: 20 June 2022
Location

Zhengzhou Hangkonggang railway station (simplified Chinese: 郑州航空港站; traditional Chinese: 鄭州航空港站; pinyin: Zhèngzhōu Hángkōnggǎng zhàn; lit. 'Zhengzhou Airport Economy Zone railway station') is a railway station in Zhongmu County, Zhengzhou, Henan, China.

== Description ==
The station is located about 6 km (3.7 mi) to the east of Zhengzhou Xinzheng International Airport in Zhengzhou Airport Economy Zone, Zhongmu County, Zhengzhou, capital of Henan Province. According to the plan, the station will become one of the four main passenger stations in Zhengzhou. Upon completion, the station will become the junction and the terminus of the now under construction Zhengzhou–Wanzhou high-speed railway and Zhengzhou–Fuyang high-speed railway, and also serve as the main hub for intercity railways in Henan province. The Zhengzhou–Xinzheng Airport intercity railway was extended to this station on 20 June 2022.

== History ==
Construction began on 29 July 2017 and the final design of station was disclosed to public on 2 August 2018. The railway station opened on 20 June 2022.

== Metro station ==
It is currently served by Chengjiao line of Zhengzhou Metro.

== See also ==
- Zhengzhou railway station
- Zhengzhou East railway station

Preceding station	China Railway High-speed	Following station
Zhengzhou East Terminus	Zhengzhou–Wanzhou high-speed railway	Changge North towards Wanzhou North
Zhengzhou East towards Zhengzhou	Zhengzhou–Fuyang high-speed railway	Xuchang North towards Fuyang West
Xinzheng Airport towards Zhengzhou East	Zhengzhou–Xinzheng Airport intercity railway	Terminus
Preceding station	Zhengzhou Metro	Following station
Gangqu Huizhan towards Jiahe	Chengjiao line	Terminus
